= List of Partisan detachments in Bosnia and Herzegovina =

The flag of the Partisan detachments of Bosnia-Herzegovina

The Yugoslav Partisans formed operational detachments (Serbo-Croatian Latin: odredi) in Bosnia and Herzegovina after the German-led Axis invasion of Yugoslavia during World War II. These detachments were formed to conduct local operations against the occupying powers and those collaborating with them, and a total of 108 detachments were created in Bosnia and Herzegovina during the war. The detachments were named after a district, town, region or geographic feature, and ranged in size from 16 to 3,000 fighters. Larger detachments were usually divided into several companies or battalions. Some detachments had a very brief existence, whereas others existed for most of the war and a few were disestablished and re-established several times. Information on some small or short-lived detachments is very limited. There were also a significant number of independent battalions outside the detachment framework, but these are not included in the scope of this article.

== Background ==
After the German-led Axis invasion of Yugoslavia in April 1941, the Communist Party of Yugoslavia (Serbo-Croatian: Komunistička partija Jugoslavije, KPJ) began to organise for military resistance if Germany attacked the Soviet Union. This involved the establishment of a central military committee on 10 April while the invasion was still underway, and the creation of a military committee for each of the "provinces" of Yugoslavia in late April after the surrender. These provinces were based on the historical "national" entities of the country, rather than the pre-war political divisions, or banovina which had artificially divided the "national" entities to reduce the threat of nationalism. Each province already had a Provincial Committee of the KPJ reporting to the Central Committee, so these provincial military committees were created in parallel with the party organisation. One of the "national" entities consisted of the regions of Bosnia and Herzegovina, which were now encompassed by the Axis puppet state known as the Independent State of Croatia (Serbo-Croatian: Nezavisna država Hrvatska, NDH). The NDH also included much of present-day Croatia. The Provincial Committee for Bosnia-Herzegovina was based in Sarajevo.

In late May and June 1941, members of the Provincial Committee for Bosnia-Herzegovina travelled to the oblast (regional) centres of Banja Luka in the Bosanska Krajina region, Mostar in Herzegovina, and Tuzla in the Birač region of eastern Bosnia to advise the oblast KPJ committees of the decisions of the Central Committee, and to form oblast military committees. This also occurred in Sarajevo, for an oblast military committee responsible for the Romanija region of eastern Bosnia located north of that city. Each oblast military committee formed district military committees, who in turn contacted KPJ members in towns and villages of their district to organise resistance. This pyramid-like structure mirrored the KPJ structure, and following the German invasion of the Soviet Union on 22 June, the Central Committee met on 4 July and decided to initiate an armed uprising against the occupiers. This included the creation of a formal military structure, headed by the Chief Headquarters for the People's Liberation Partisan Detachments of Yugoslavia under the leadership of Josip Broz Tito, who was also the General Secretary of the Central Committee of the KPJ.

Svetozar Vukmanović, a Montenegrin member of the Central Committee was appointed to command the Provincial Military Staff for Bosnia-Herzegovina. Vukmanović was widely known by the nickname "Tempo" owing to his constant urging of his subordinates to hurry. Vukmanović-Tempo called a meeting of the Provincial KPJ Committee in Sarajevo on 13 July. This meeting appointed Iso Jovanović, the secretary of the Provincial KPJ Committee, and Boriša Kovačević as the other two members of the Provincial Military Staff for Bosnia-Herzegovina, and redesignated the four oblast military committees as "military staffs". One member of the Provincial KPJ Committee was sent to each of the three military staffs outside Sarajevo to assist them. Đuro Pucar-Stari, a native of Bosansko Grahovo in the Krajina was sent to Banja Luka, Uglješa Danilović, a native of Odžak in northeastern Bosnia was sent to Tuzla, and Avdo Humo was sent to his home town of Mostar. The leaders at the district level in each region were appointed as military commissioners, and this was repeated at the village level if KPJ members or sympathisers existed.

== Major developments ==
=== July uprising ===
On 27 July, an uprising broke out in the Krajina, triggered by the ambush and killing of a Croatian Home Guard officer. This had resulted in the rounding up and maltreatment of ethnic Serb villagers in the Bosansko Grahovo district. The local KPJ structures were not ready to launch an uprising, and had no instructions to do so. They were drawn into a mass Serb uprising not of their creation, and quickly had to adapt to their circumstances. The following day, an uprising broke out in the Romanija region, and this was followed by an outbreak of resistance in the Birač region on 5 August. The forces involved in this fighting were spontaneously formed companies based on the traditional social structure of villages, which were grouped into battalions when numbers dictated. Where the opportunity arose, KPJ members and military staff at the district and village level would attempt to gain some control over these units, but they were far from communist-led as a whole, at least initially. KPJ-led rebels across Bosnia-Herzegovina formed military structures as needed, without any central direction, and brigades and even a division were formed. In the Drvar district for example, units were known as "Guerilla" rather than "Partisan" detachments, and in some cases several companies formed a detachment, where in others, several detachments formed a company.

=== Establishment of a uniform system of organisation ===
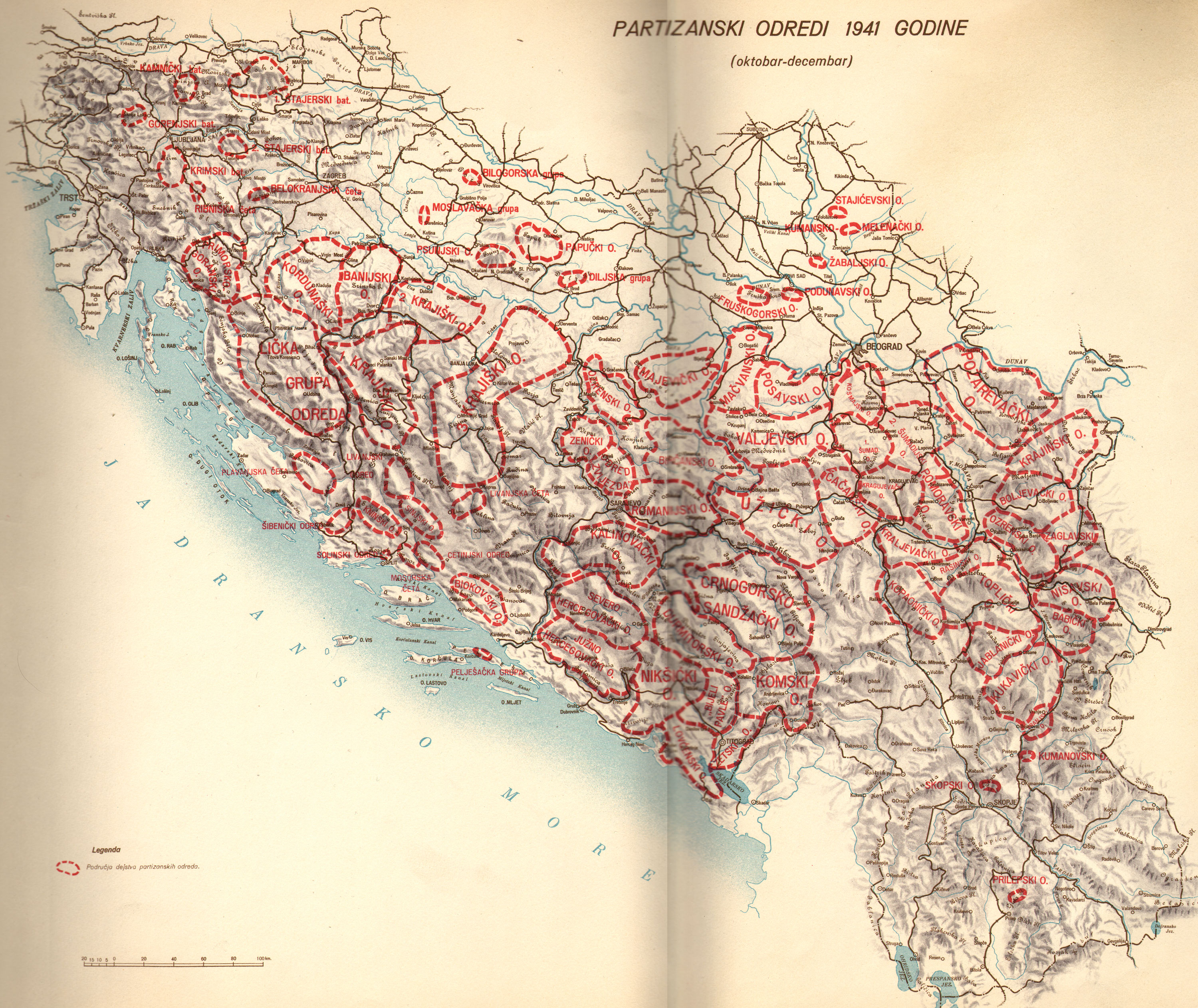
A map showing the areas of responsibility of Yugoslav Partisan detachments in October–December 1941

On 26 September 1941, the Chief Headquarters for the People's Liberation Partisan Detachments of Yugoslavia held a conference at Stolice in the German-occupied territory of Serbia, at which it adopted a standard structure for the military organisation of the resistance. The Chief Headquarters was renamed the Supreme Headquarters, and the Military Staff of each province became the General Staff. The basic Partisan unit was to be a company of 80–100 soldiers, composed of platoons and sections. Two to four companies were to make up a battalion, and three to four battalions formed a detachment, the largest unit of the Partisan forces. Each detachment would have a staff consisting of a commander and deputy, with a political commissar and deputy, and the detachment staff would be directly responsible to the General Staff. On that basis, the existing Partisan units operating in Bosnia-Herzegovina were re-organised in October and November 1941 into ten detachments, six in east Bosnia, three in Bosanska Krajina, and one in Herzegovina. The Sarajevo and Tuzla Military Staffs were dissolved and detachments in those regions were placed under the direct control of the General Staff for the People's Liberation Partisan Detachments of Bosnia-Herzegovina.

=== The "Volunteer Army" ===
As a result of simmering tension between Serb-chauvinists and the communists, the Provincial Committee of the KPJ for Bosnia-Herzegovina held a conference at Ivančići in the Romanija region on 7–8 January 1942. This conference was chaired by Tito, and one of the outcomes was the creation of a "Volunteer Army" of soldiers that would fight alongside the Partisans under shared command, but were not willing to become Partisans themselves. The Supreme Headquarters was renamed the Supreme Headquarters for the People's Liberation Partisan and Volunteer Army of Yugoslavia. This was intended to drive a wedge between Bosnian Chetniks and the Serbian-based Yugoslav Chetnik movement of Draža Mihailović. Seven "volunteer" detachments were raised, all in eastern Bosnia, and some battalions and companies of former Chetniks were placed under the command of existing detachments. In all, the "Volunteer Army" numbered a maximum of 7,000–8,000 fighters who were, according to the historian Marko Attila Hoare, of "dubious political loyalty and military value". The short-lived "Volunteer Army" concept was dispensed with following pro-Chetnik coups in both "volunteer" and Partisan detachments in eastern Bosnia in April and May 1942, and was quietly abolished by Tito in November 1942. After this, until the formation of the Yugoslav Army in the last six months of the war, the title of the Partisan army was the People's Liberation Army and Partisan Detachments of Yugoslavia.

== Detachments ==
A total of 108 detachments were created in Bosnia and Herzegovina during the war. The detachments were named after a district, town, region or geographic feature, and ranged in size from 16 to 3,000 fighters. Larger detachments were usually divided into several companies or battalions. Some detachments had a very brief existence, whereas others existed for most of the war and a few were disestablished and re-established several times. Information on some small or short-lived detachments is very limited.

| Detachment | Date of formation | Place of formation | Strength | Composition | Superior headquarters | Disestablished | Re-established/Re-organised | Notes/Footnotes |
|---|---|---|---|---|---|---|---|---|
| Banja Luka | May 1943 | Central Bosnia | — | 4 companies (August 1943); 2 battalions (September 1943) | 11th Division (from 1 June 1943); 1st Corps (from 19 July 1943); 39th Division (from 26 March 1944) | 1. 13 January 1944; 2. May 1945 | re-established 18 February 1944 | |
| Bijeljina | 15 August 1941 | — | — | — | Substaff Majevica | 1 September 1941 | — | |
| Bileća | September 1943 | — | 30–100 | — | — | 23 November 1943 –7 December 1944 | re-established October 1944 | |
| Birač | 15 August 1941 | Birač | 500–700 (Autumn 1941); 200–300 (October 1943) | 3 battalions (December 1941) | 1st Corps (May 1943) | 15 February 1945 | — | This detachment was one of the 10 Bosnia-Herzegovina detachments remaining after the Stolice re-organisation. |
| Birač-Kladanj | 15 February 1945 | — | — | — | 27th Division | 11 May 1945 | — | |
| Bišina | November 1943 | — | 30–100 | — | — | 23 November 1943 | — | |
| Blagaj | 1943 | — | — | — | 10th Division | 6 September 1943 | — | |
| Blagaj-Janj | 6 September 1943 | — | 250 (1943) | 2 companies (November 1943) | 10th Division | — | — | |
| Cazin | 8 September 1943 | Cazin | 262 (8 September 1943) | 2 battalions (8 September 1943) | — | 8 February 1944 | — | |
| Cazin Krajina | 15 March 1944 | Cazin | 808 (15 March 1944) | 3 battalions (15 March 1944); 3 battalions (February 1945) | Una Operational Group (15 March 1944) | 1. May 1944; 2. September 1944; 3. May 1945 | 1. re-established August 1944; 2. re-established February 1945 | |
| Cikote | 15 August 1941 | — | 86 (20 August 1941) | — | Birač district headquarters | 20 September 1941 | redesignated as a company (20 September 1941) | |
| Crni Vrh | 18 October 1943 | Prnjavor | 100 (18 October 1943) | 2 companies | 11th Division | late December 1944 | — | |
| Dabar | September 1943 | — | 30–100 | — | — | 23 November 1943 | — | This detachment was also known as the "Miro Popara" Detachment. |
| Doboj-Derventa | November 1943 | Doboj district | 100 (mid-November 1943) | — | 11th Division (mid-November 1943) | 13 January 1944 | — | |
| Drina Volunteer | 13 March 1942 | Goražde and Čajniče districts | 880 | 3 battalions | — | 23 May 1942 | — | |
| Drvar-Petrovac | May 1943 | Drvar district | 300 (May 1943); 883 (November 1943) | 5 companies 2 battalions (August 1943) | 2nd Corps (May 1943); 4th Division (late 1943) | January 1945 | — | This detachment was also known as the Grabovač Detachment. |
| Dulići | November 1943 | — | 30–100 | — | — | 23 November 1944 | — | This detachment was also known as the Gatački Detachment. |
| Duvno | 30 October 1943 | Duvno district | — | 2 companies | 8th Corps (autumn 1943); 5th Corps (April 1944) | 11 April 1944 | — | |
| Foča Volunteer | 24 February 1942 | — | — | 4 battalions | — | 18 May 1942 | — | (Note: On 18 May 1942, the staff of this detachment were killed or forced to flee by Chetnik elements from its Zakmur Battalion.) |
| Glamoč | October 1943 | — | — | — | 20th Division (October 1943); 10th Division (February 1944) | 10 October 1944 | — | |
| Glamoč Guerilla | 30 July 1941 | — | — | — | — | — | — | |
| Glamoč-Livno | April 1943 | Glamoč district | — | 2 battalions (May 1943); 3 battalions and one company (June 1943) | 10th Division (end of April 1943) | — | — | |
| Grabovac | 15 August 1941 | — | 60 (20 August 1941) | — | Birač district headquarters | — | — | |
| Gradiška-Lijevče | 20 November 1943 | Lijevče | 80 (20 November 1943); 400+ (September 1944) | 3 companies (end of 1943); 2 battalions (September 1944) | 5th Corps (20 November 1943); Kozara Group (28 July 1944) | 12 October 1944 | — | This detachment was also known as the Lijevče Detachment. |
| Grahovo-Peulje | July 1941 | Bosansko Grahovo district | 250 (August 1941); 800 (6 September 1943) | 2 companies (August 1943); 2 battalions and one company (October 1943) | 5th Corps (23 August 1943) | 1. September 1941; 2. March 1945 | re-established August 1943 re-organised October 1943 | This detachment was also known as "Gavrilo Princip" Detachment. |
| Herzegovina | October 1941 | Suho | 330 (14 June 1942) | 3 battalions (October 1941) | Interim operational staff for Herzegovina (4 January 1942) | 1. February 1942; 2. 10 August 1942 | re-established from North Herzegovina and South Herzegovina Detachments in March 1942 | This detachment was one of the 10 Bosnia-Herzegovina detachments remaining after the Stolice re-organisation, and was formed from the Herzegovinian Brigade. |
| Jahorina | September 1943 | Jahorina | 250 (September 1943) | — | 27th Division | 30 April 1944 | — | |
| Jahorina Volunteer | 21 January 1942 | — | 900 (February 1942) | 13 companies in 3 battalions (February 1942) | — | early May 1942 | — | |
| Jajce-Travnik | 18 October 1944 | — | 90 (January 1944) | — | 10th Division | February 1945 | — | |
| Janja | January 1944 | Janja | 90 (January 1944) | — | 10th Division | 14 October 1944 | — | |
| Janj | — | — | — | — | 10th Division | 6 September 1943 | — | |
| Japra Guerilla | 28 September 1941 | — | — | — | Krupa and Sana district headquarters | — | — | |
| Jelašinovci Guerilla | 28 September 1941 | — | — | — | Krupa and Sana district headquarters | — | — | |
| Kalinovik | September 1941 | — | — | 4 battalions | — | — | — | This detachment was one of the 10 Bosnia-Herzegovina detachments remaining after the Stolice re-organisation, and was formed from the Bosnian-Herzegovinian Brigade. |
| Kladanj | — | — | — | — | — | — | — | |
| Kladanj-Ozren | — | — | — | — | — | — | — | |
| Konjic | — | — | — | — | — | — | — | |
| Kozara | — | — | — | — | — | — | — | |
| Krajina (1st) | October 1941 | Drvar/ Podgrmeč | 600 (October 1941) | 7 companies (October 1941) | Operational staff for Bosanska Krajina | — | — | This detachment was one of the 10 Bosnia-Herzegovina detachments remaining after the Stolice re-organisation, and was formed from the Drvar Brigade. |
| Krajina (2nd) | October 1941 | Kozara | — | 6 companies (October 1941) | Operational staff for Bosanska Krajina | — | — | This detachment was one of the 10 Bosnia-Herzegovina detachments remaining after the Stolice re-organisation, and was formed from the Kozara Detachment. |
| Krajina (3rd) | November 1941 | central Bosnia | — | 6 battalions (26 November 1941) | Operational staff for Bosanska Krajina | — | — | This detachment was one of the 10 Bosnia-Herzegovina detachments remaining after the Stolice re-organisation. |
| Krajina (4th) | February 1942 | — | — | — | Operational staff for Bosanska Krajina | — | — | This detachment was formed from elements of the 3rd Krajina Detachment. |
| Krajina (5th) | February 1942 | — | — | — | Operational staff for Bosanska Krajina | — | — | This detachment was formed from elements of the 1st Krajina Detachment. |
| Krajina (6th) | 1 May 1942 | Manjača | 1,000 (17 August 1942) | 1 battalion (May 1942); 3 battalions (17 August 1942) | Operational staff for Bosanska Krajina | 1. 20 May 1942; 2. 22 October 1942 | re-established 17 August 1942 | |
| Krajina Volunteer | — | — | — | — | — | — | — | |
| Kupres-Janj | May 1943 | Kupres | — | 2 companies (May 1943) | 10th Division (May 1943) | June 1943 | — | |
| Kupres | 27 July 1943 | — | 230 (October 1943) | 1 battalion | 10th Division | September 1943 | — | This detachment was also known as the Blagaj Detachment or Blagaj-Janj Detachment. |
| Lim | 4 November 1943 | Rudo and Višegrad districts | 150 (November 1943) | 3 battalions (November 1943) | 2nd Shock Corps (4 November 1943) | 15 December 1943 | — | |
| Livno | 14 October 1941 | Cincar | — | one company (14 October 1941) | 20th Division (October 1943); 5th Corps (February 1944) | 1. 6 June 1942; 2. 11 April 1944 | re-established September 1943 | |
| Livno-Duvno | 11 April 1944 | Livno and Duvno districts | 1,000 (end of 1944) | two battalions (11 April 1944); 6 battalions (end of 1944) | 10th Division (July 1944) | 17 March 1945 | — | |
| Ljubinje | October 1944 | Herzegovina | — | — | — | 7 December 1944 | — | |
| Majevica | August 1941 | Majevica | 50 (September 1941); 200 (November 1941) | 2 companies (August 1941); 1 battalion and 2 companies (November 1941) | — | 1. September 1941; 2. March 1942 | re-established September 1941 | This detachment was one of the 10 Bosnia-Herzegovina detachments remaining after the Stolice re-organisation. |
| Majevica (1st) | 28 July 1942 | Majevica | 300 (28 November 1942) | 2 battalions (28 November 1942); 3 battalions (January 1943) | — | 25 March 1943 | — | |
| Majevica (2nd) | February 1943 | Majevica | 500 (July 1943) | 3 battalions 4 battalions (July 1943) | 1st Bosnian Shock Corps | 10 October 1943 | — | |
| Majevica (3rd) | November 1943 | Majevica | — | 2–4 battalions | 16th Division (November 1943); 38th Division (6 March 1944) | 11 May 1945 | — | |
| Manjača | 11 August 1941 | — | — | — | — | — | — | |
| Mostar | 16 March 1944 | Konjic district | 230 | 2 battalions | — | 25 May 1944 | — | |
| Motajica | 11 November 1943 | Motajica | — | 1 company 3 companies (April 1944) | 11th Division (11 November 1943); 53rd Division (August 1944) | 1. 13 January 1944; 2. May 1945 | re-established 14 February 1944 | |
| Nevesinje Uprising | November 1943 | – | 30–100 | – | – | – | – | |
| North Herzegovina | — | — | — | 4 battalions (April 1942); 3 battalions (23 November 1943) | 29th Division (23 November 1943) | 1. June 1942; 2. 18 April 1944 | re-established November 1943 | |
| Ozren | August 1941 | Ozren | 500; 1,000 (November 1941); 230 (November 1943) | 3 companies 4 battalions (November 1941); 5 battalions (February 1942) | 17th Division (21 July 1943) | 1. 18 April 1942; 2. 25 January 1944 | re-established 21 July 1943 | This detachment was one of the 10 Bosnia-Herzegovina detachments remaining after the Stolice re-organisation. |
| Palanka | 28 September 1941 | — | — | — | Krupa and Sana district headquarters | — | — | |
| Papraća | 15 August 1941 | — | 100 (20 August 1941) | — | Birač district headquarters | 20 September 1941 | redesignated as a company (20 September 1941) | |
| Planina | August 1943 | Herzegovina | — | — | — | September 1943 | — | |
| Pljeva | 8 October 1943 | Mrkonjić Grad district | 150 (March 1944) | 2 companies (March 1944); 4 companies (mid-1944) | 10th Division (October 1943); 39th Division (26 March 1944) | January 1945 | — | This detachment was also known as the Mrkonjić Detachment or Mrkonjić-Pljeva Detachment. |
| Podgrmeč | 7 May 1943 | Podgrmeč | 300–500 | 3 companies (May 1943) | 4th Division (7 May 1943); Grmeč Operational Group (12 July 1943); 2nd Corps (8 September 1943); 4th Division (end of 1943); 39th Division (September 1944) | 12 July 1945 | — | |
| Podrinje-Semberija | August 1943 | Bijeljina region | — | — | 17th Division (Autumn 1943) | early October 1943 | — | |
| Popovo | September 1943 | — | 30–100 | — | — | 23 November 1943 | — | |
| Posavina | 16 September 1943 | Bosanski Šamac district | 250; 700 (December 1943) | 3 battalions (November 1943) | 17th Division (Autumn 1943) | early February 1944 | — | |
| Posavina-Trebava | February 1944 | — | 270 | 3 battalions (Autumn 1944) | 38th Division (early March 1944) | early June 1945 | — | |
| Površ | August 1943 | — | — | — | — | 23 November 1943 | — | |
| Prekaja Guerilla | 31 July 1941 | — | — | — | Bosansko Grahovo County Guerilla Detachment staff | — | — | |
| Prnjavor | 10 June 1943 | Prnjavor | 1,000 (September 1943) | 1 battalion 4 or 5 battalions (September 1943) | 11th Division | 1. 13 January 1944; 2. July 1944 | re-organised 16 October 1943 re-established 18 February 1944 | |
| Prozor | July 1943 | — | — | — | — | October 1944 | — | |
| Rama | February 1943 | Prozor district | 80; 180 (November 1943) | 2 battalions | 10th Division (July 1943) | 1. February 1943; 2. 14 May 1944 | re-established July 1943 | |
| Ribnik | — | Crkveno district | 250; 900 (August 1943) | 2 battalions | 4th Division (Summer 1943); Grmeč Operational Group (August 1943); 10th Division (end of 1943) | 1. 26 August 1943; 2. 26 March 1944 | re-established 18 November 1943 | |
| Rogatica Volunteer | — | — | 950 | 3 battalions | — | May 1942 | — | |
| Romanija | — | Romanija region | 1,230–3,000 (November 1941); 70–80 (August 1943); 500 (20 November 1943) | 3 battalions (5 October 1941); 9 battalions (November 1941); 3 battalions (February 1942) | Sarajevo oblast staff (October 1941); General Staff for Bosnia-Herzegovina (to 3 February 1942); Operational Staff for East Bosnia (3 February 1942); 17th Division (Summer 1943); 27th Division (10 October 1943); 17th Division (4 March 1944); 27th Division 10 October 1944 | 1. May 1942; 2. 20 May 1944 | re-established August 1943 | This detachment was one of the 10 Bosnia-Herzegovina detachments remaining after the Stolice re-organisation. |
| Sana | — | — | 100 (November 1943) | 2 companies (November 1943) | 4th Division | 26 March 1944 | — | |
| Sitnica | 26 June 1944 | — | — | — | 29th Division (August 1944) | 7 December 1944 | — | |
| South Herzegovina | February 1942 | — | 300 (23 November 1943) | 4 battalions (April 1942); 3 battalions (23 November 1943) | 29th Division (23 November 1943) | 1. June 1942; 2. 10 September 1944 | re-established 23 November 1943 | |
| Spreča | 15 August 1941 | — | 60 (20 August 1941) | — | Birač district headquarters | 20 October 1941 | — | |
| Srebrenica | 9 October 1943 | Fakovići | 16–50 (December 1943); 727 (27 March 1944); 600 (March 1945) | — | — | 1. late December 1943; 2. early April 1945 | re-established 5 March 1944 re-organised into 2 battalions on 27 March 1944 | |
| Srebrenica Volunteer | March 1942 | — | — | 3 battalions | — | April 1942 | — | |
| Stolac | September 1943 | — | 30–100 | — | — | 1. 23 September 1943; 2. 7 December 1944 | re-established October 1944 | |
| Stupari | 15 August 1941 | eastern Bosnia | 80 (20 August 1941) | — | Birač district headquarters | 20 October 1941 | — | |
| Šehovići | 15 August 1941 | eastern Bosnia | 120 (20 August 1941) | — | Birač district headquarters | 20 October 1941 | — | |
| Šuma | September 1943 | Herzegovina | 30–100 | — | — | 23 November 1943 | — | |
| Tešanj-Teslić | 18 September 1943 | eastern Bosnia | 50 | — | 11th Division | 1. 13 January 1944; 2. 7 September 1944 | re-established 18 February 1944 | This detachment was also known as the Tešanj Detachment. |
| Timar | 15 May 1944 | Prijedor district | 600 (September 1944) | — | 4th Division (15 May 1944); Kozara Group (28 July 1944) | 12 October 1944 | — | |
| Travnik | April 1942 | Vlašić region | 800 (September 1943) | 2 companies (Summer 1943); 2 battalions (Autumn 1943) | 10th Division (May 1943) | 1. 15 May 1942; 2. 18 October 1944 | re-established May 1943 | |
| Trebava | September 1943 | Trebava region | 160 | 3 battalions (October 1943) | 17th Division (September 1943); 16th Division (October 1943) | February 1944 | — | |
| Trebinje | October 1944 | — | — | — | — | 7 December 1944 | — | |
| Tupanar | 15 August 1941 | eastern Bosnia | 100 (20 August 1941) | — | Birač district headquarters | 20 September 1941 | — | This detachment was also known as the Trnavski Detachment. |
| Tuzla | 24 October 1943 | Tuzla region | 600; 500 (Winter 1945) | 4 battalions | 17th Division | May 1945 | — | |
| Udarni | 2 December 1943 | Bosanska Krajina region | — | 3 battalions | 5th Corps | 5 May 1944 | — | |
| Udrežanj | September 1943 | Herzegovina | 30–100 | — | — | October 1943 | — | |
| Visoko-Fojnica | September 1944 | Kotor Varoš district | 100 | — | 53rd Division (September 1944) | April 1945 | — | |
| Visoko-Fojnica | 17 July 1943 | Kreševo district | — | — | 10th Division | 8 January 1945 | — | |
| Vlahovići | September 1943 | Herzegovina | 30–100 | — | — | 23 November 1945 | — | |
| Vlasenica Volunteer | March 1942 | — | 700 | 4 battalions | — | April 1942 | — | |
| Vlašić | May 1944 | Travnik district | 100 | 2 companies | 4th Division; Zenica Brigade Group (March 1945) | May 1945 | — | |
| Vukovsko | 27 July 1943 | Kupres district | 100 | — | 10th Division (Summer 1943) | January 1944 | — | |
| West Herzegovina | September 1944 | Duge Njive | 100 (September 1943) | 4 companies (September 1944) | South Dalmatia Group (September 1944); 29th Division (November 1944) | 7 December 1944 | — | |
| Zenica | 9 April 1942 | Zenica | 200 | — | — | 6 May 1942 | — | |
| Zmijanje | 29 November 1943 | Mrkonjić Grad district | 180 | — | 5th Corps (29 November 1943); 4th Division (4 December 1943); 39th Division (26 March 1944) | May 1945 | — | |
| Zvijezda | October 1941 | Zvijezda region | 1,200 (November 1941) | 4 battalions and 1 company (November 1941) | — | May 1942 | — | This detachment was one of the 10 Bosnia-Herzegovina detachments remaining after the Stolice re-organisation. |
