= Sarajevo Operation =

Liberation of Sarajevo and Central Bosnia

- Part of World War II in Yugoslavia
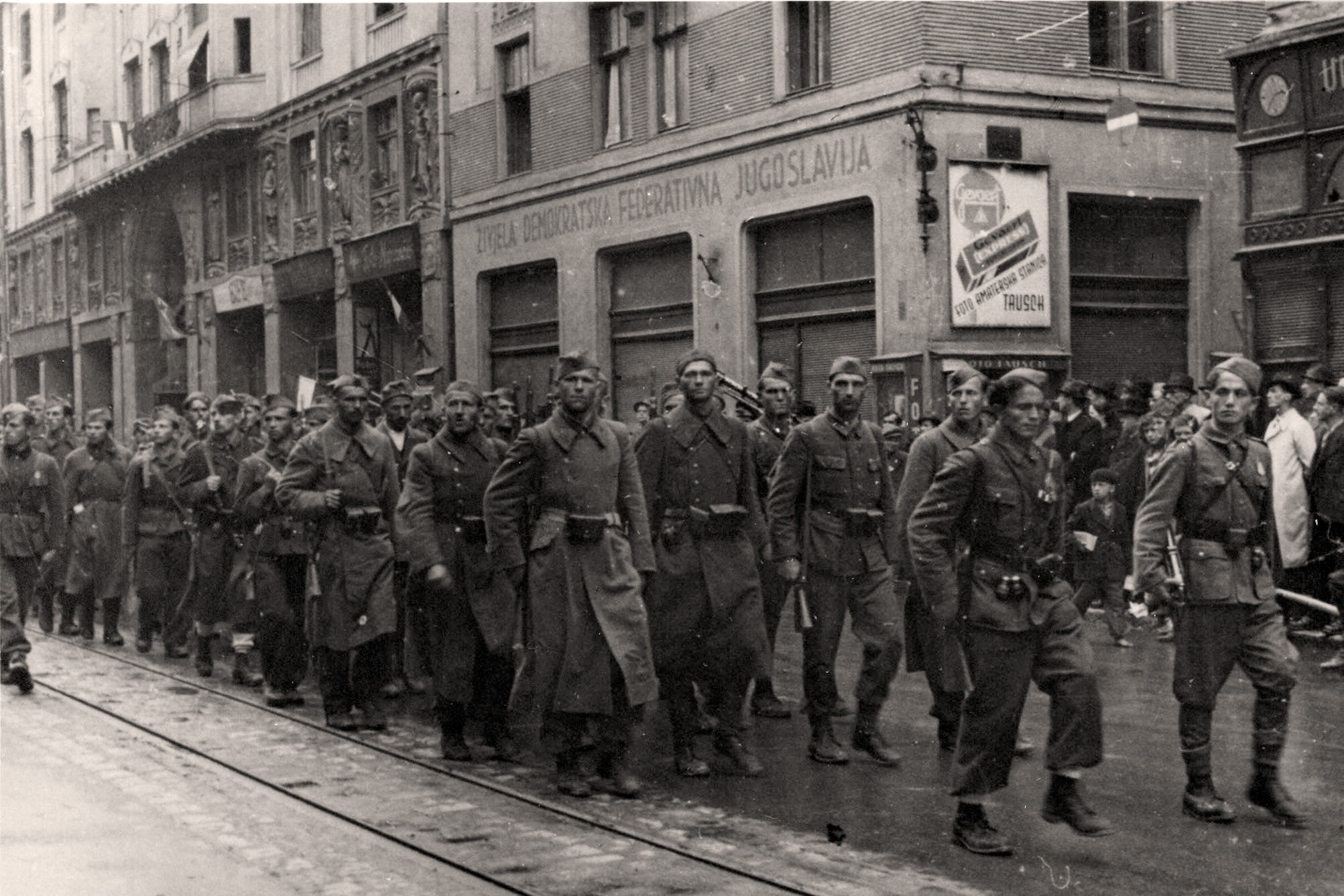
- 3rd Yugoslav Partisans' Corps enter liberated Sarajevo, 6 April 1945
Date	28 March – 10 April 1945
Location	Sarajevo, Bosnia 43°52′N 18°25′E
Result	Partisan victory: Liberation of Sarajevo

Belligerents
Yugoslav Partisans Green Cadres (paramilitary)	Germany; Independent State of Croatia

Commanders and leaders
Radovan Vukanović; Pero Kosorić; Slavko Rodić; Vladimir Perić †	(Nazi Germany) Ernst von Leyser

Strength
38,000 men (5,000–18,000 Zeleni Kader/Green Caders)	50,000 men of which 35,000 Germans

Casualties and losses
637 killed 2,020 wounded	5,700 killed and wounded 6,000 prisoners

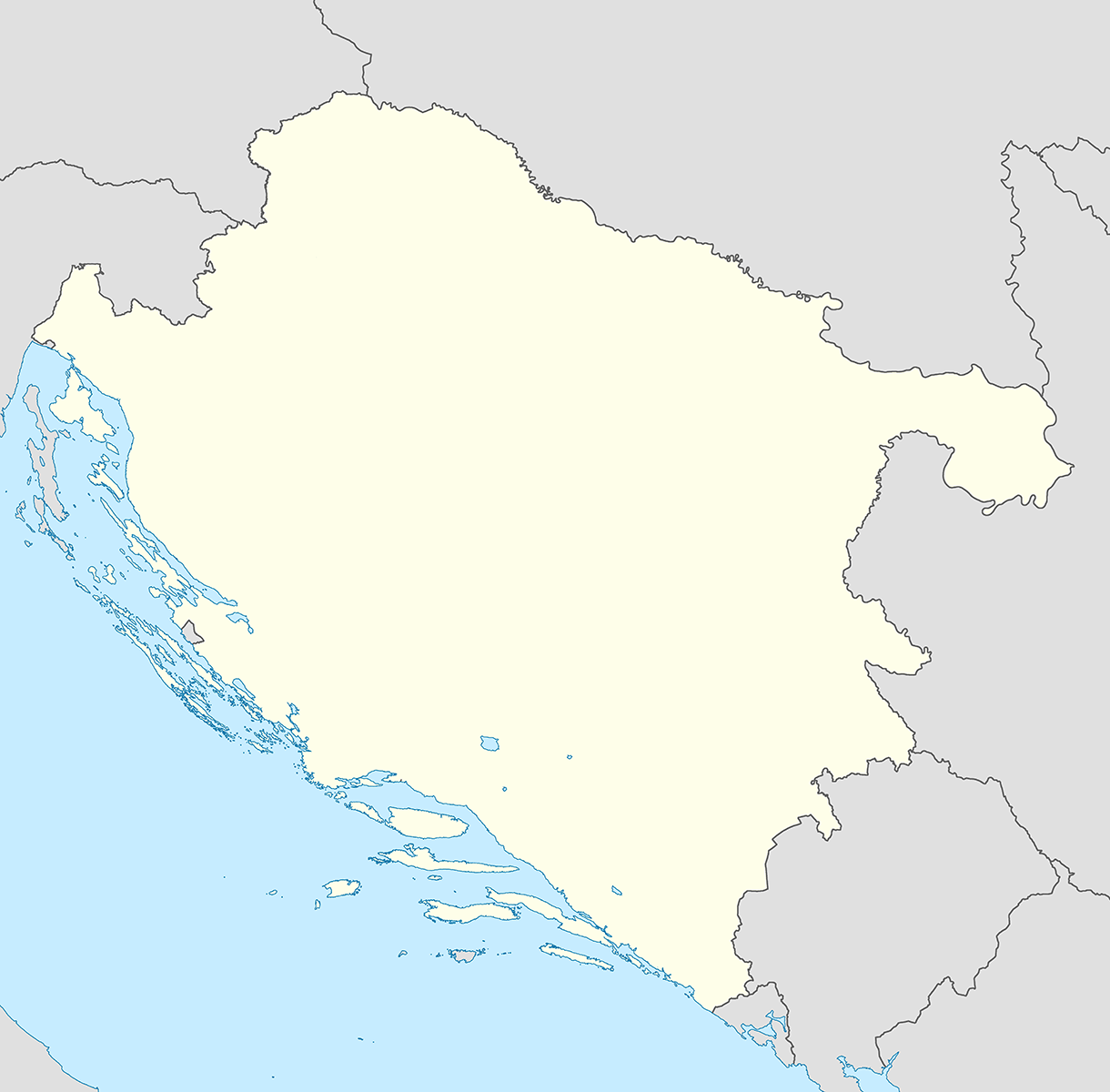
Location of Sarajevo within the Independent State of Croatia

Untenable position of Sarajevo

The Sarajevo Operation was an operation by the Yugoslav Partisan Army which led to the liberation of Sarajevo and Central Bosnia in March-April 1945.

== The Battle ==
The German defense plan for Yugoslavia of 22nd of February 1945 had named Sarajevo as a fortified city, which could only be abandoned by direct permission from Adolf Hitler. By 20th of March, the failure of Operation Spring Awakening (the German offensive in Hungary) and the successful offensive of the Yugoslav 4th Army in Lika (North-Western Croatia), made holding Sarajevo pointless. The retreat was ordered, with 3,000 wounded German soldiers from the Sarajevo hospital going first. Interception of Yugoslav wireless communications had revealed to the Germans that the general attack was planned for 28th of March. In order to secure their retreat routes, the German Army carried out the Berggeist, Maigewitter and Osterglocke Operations.

On 28th of March 1945, the Yugoslav Army launched its attack. Under command of the Operational HQ for Liberation of Sarajevo were the 2nd, 3rd and 5th Corps of the Yugoslav army, supported by the 11th and 13th Krajina and 18th Central Bosnian Brigade, an Artillery Brigade and a Tank Company. The overall commander was the commander of the 2nd Corps Radovan Vukanović. Sarajevo and its surrounding areas were defended by German and NDH forces under command of the German 21st Mountain Corps.

After heavy fighting, the city of Sarajevo was liberated on 6th of April.

During the pursuit of the enemy, Yugoslav units liberated Visoko, Kakanj and on 10th of April Busovača, which concluded the Sarajevo operation.

== Order of battle ==
=== Axis ===
- XXI Mountain Corps (Ernst von Leyser)
  - (Nazi Germany) 7th SS Volunteer Mountain Division Prinz Eugen
  - (Nazi Germany) 369th (Croatian) Infantry Division
  - (Nazi Germany) 181st Infantry Division
  - (Independent State of Croatia) 9th Mountain Ustashe Home Guard Division (5 brigades)

=== Partisans ===
- 2nd Corps (Radovan Vukanović)
  - 3rd Division
  - 29th Division
  - 37th Division
- 3rd Corps (Pero Kosorić)
  - 27th Division
  - 38th Division
- 5th Corps (Slavko Rodić)
  - 4th Division
  - 10th Division
  - Zenica Combat Group

== See also ==
- Walter Defends Sarajevo

== Sources ==
- Sarajevo Operation

Green cadres (paramilitary).
