= Slobodan Kezunović =

- Born: Slobodan Kezunović; June 26, 1920; Sokolac, Kingdom of Montenegro
- Died: March 10, 2006 (aged 85); Belgrade, Serbia and Montenegro
- Military career
- Allegiance: Yugoslav Partisans; Yugoslav People's Army
- Service years: 1941–1945; 1945–1976
- Rank: Major general
- Units: 1st Proletarian Corps; First Yugoslav Army; Territorial Defense of Bosnia and Herzegovina
- Conflicts: World War II
- Awards: Order of Freedom; Order of National Liberation; Order of the War Banner

Slobodan Kezunović (Serbo-Croatian Cyrillic: Слободан Кезуновић; 26 March 1920 – 10 March 2006) was a communist revolutionary, Yugoslav Partisan who reached the rank of Major general in the Yugoslav 1st Proletarian Corps, 1st and 4th Armies during the Second World War and was a councillor at the second Anti-Fascist Council for the National Liberation of Yugoslavia. He forged a military career after the war, being named Chief of staff of the Territorial Defense Forces of Bosnia and Herzegovina. From 1955 to 1956 he was president of the assembly of Yugoslav First League club FK Sarajevo.
