= 17th Division (Yugoslav Partisans) =

17th East Bosnia Division
- Flag of Democratic Federal Yugoslavia (used by the Partisans)
- Active: 1943–1945
- Country: Democratic Federal Yugoslavia
- Branch: Yugoslav Partisan Army
- Type: Infantry
- Size: 8,774 (15 February 1945)
- Part of: 3rd Corps; 2nd Corps
- Engagements: World War II in Yugoslavia

Commanders
- Notable commanders: Gligorije Mandić

The 17th East Bosnia Assault Division (Serbo-Croatian Latin: Sedamnaesta istočnobosanska udarna divizija) was Yugoslav Partisan division formed on 2 July 1943. The division was formed from the 6th East Bosnia Brigade, the 1st Majevica Brigade and Majevica Detachment. Gligorije Mandić was a commander of the division while its political commissar was Branko Petričević. The division was under the direct command of the Supreme Headquarters until 20 September 1943 when it came under the command of the 3rd Corps. During a brief time in May and June 1944, it was again under the command of the Supreme Headquarters, following that it became a part of the 2nd Corps. The division mostly fought in Bosnia and Serbia.

Among its sub-units was (from September 1943 to March 1944) the 16th Muslim Brigade.
