= 16th Muslim Brigade =

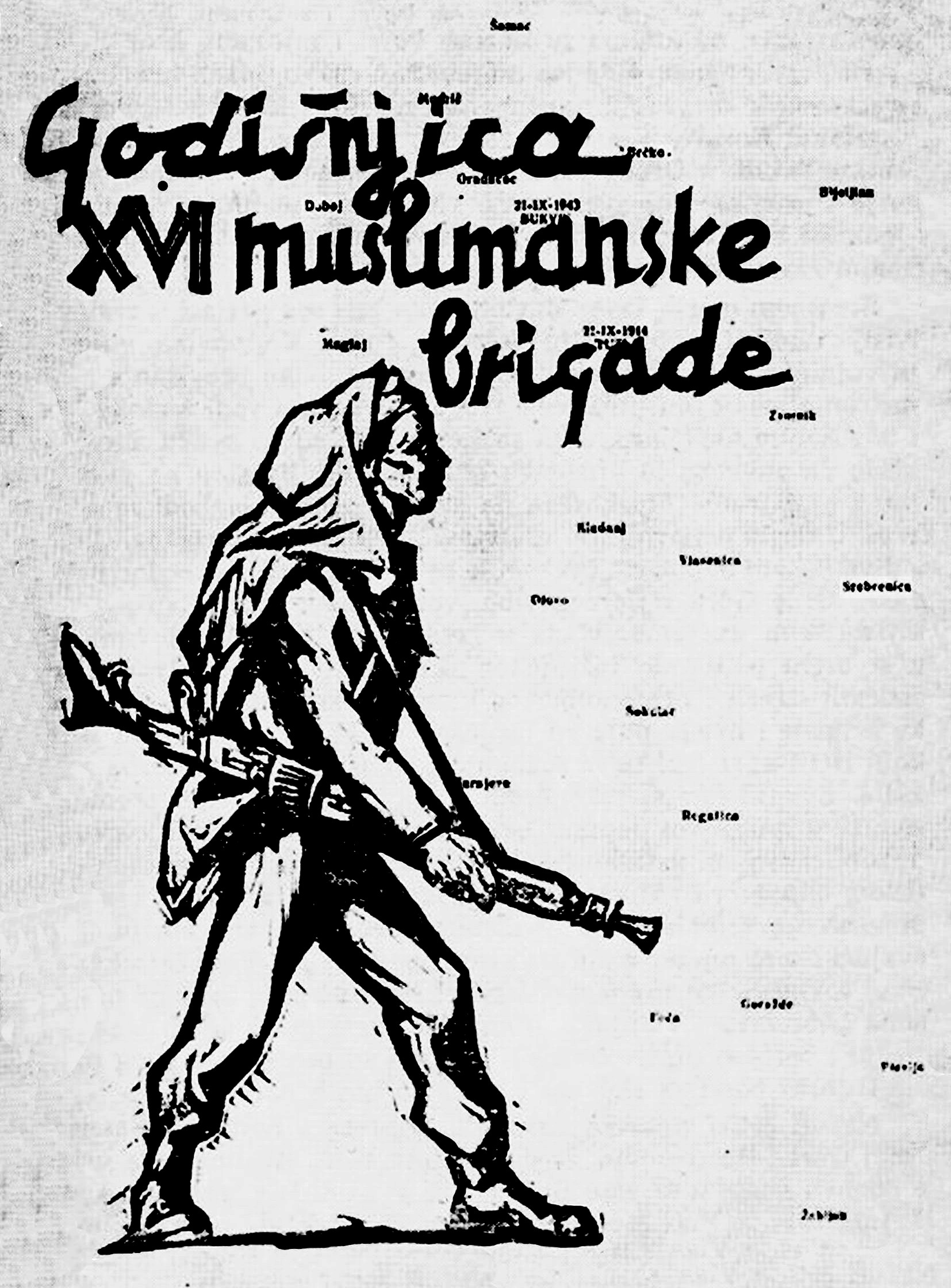
- Propaganda poster for the 16th Muslim Brigade, showing a Muslim partisan carrying an MG 42
- Active: 1943–1945
- Allegiance: Yugoslav Partisan Army
- Type: Infantry
- Size: 4 battalions
- Part of: 17th East Bosnia Division (1943-1944), 27th East Bosnia Division (1944-1945)
- Engagements: World War II in Yugoslavia: Operation Kugelblitz (1943); Tuzla Offensive (1944); Sarajevo Operation (1945); Battle of Odžak (1945)

Commanders
- Notable commanders: Salim Ćerić

The 16th Muslim Brigade (Serbo-Croatian: XVI Muslimanska Udarna Brigada), also called the 16th Muslim Assault Brigade, was a Yugoslav Partisan infantry formation composed of Bosnian Muslims that fought in World War II in Yugoslavia.

The origin of the unit was in a previous Muslim battalion, created from separating out Muslims serving in several other partisan divisions. The 16th Muslim Brigade was officially created on 21 September 1943, originally named the 3rd Muslim Brigade, as part of the 17th East Bosnia Division. The brigade was established in large part to propagandize Muslims to join the partisan resistance movement of Tito.

The brigade was soon put into action, helping capture the town of Tuzla from the occupying forces in autumn 1943, although this soon reversed when on 11 November the German 1. Gebirgs-Division recaptured Tuzla. It conducted harassing attacks during this time, such as ambushing and eliminating a German motor column.

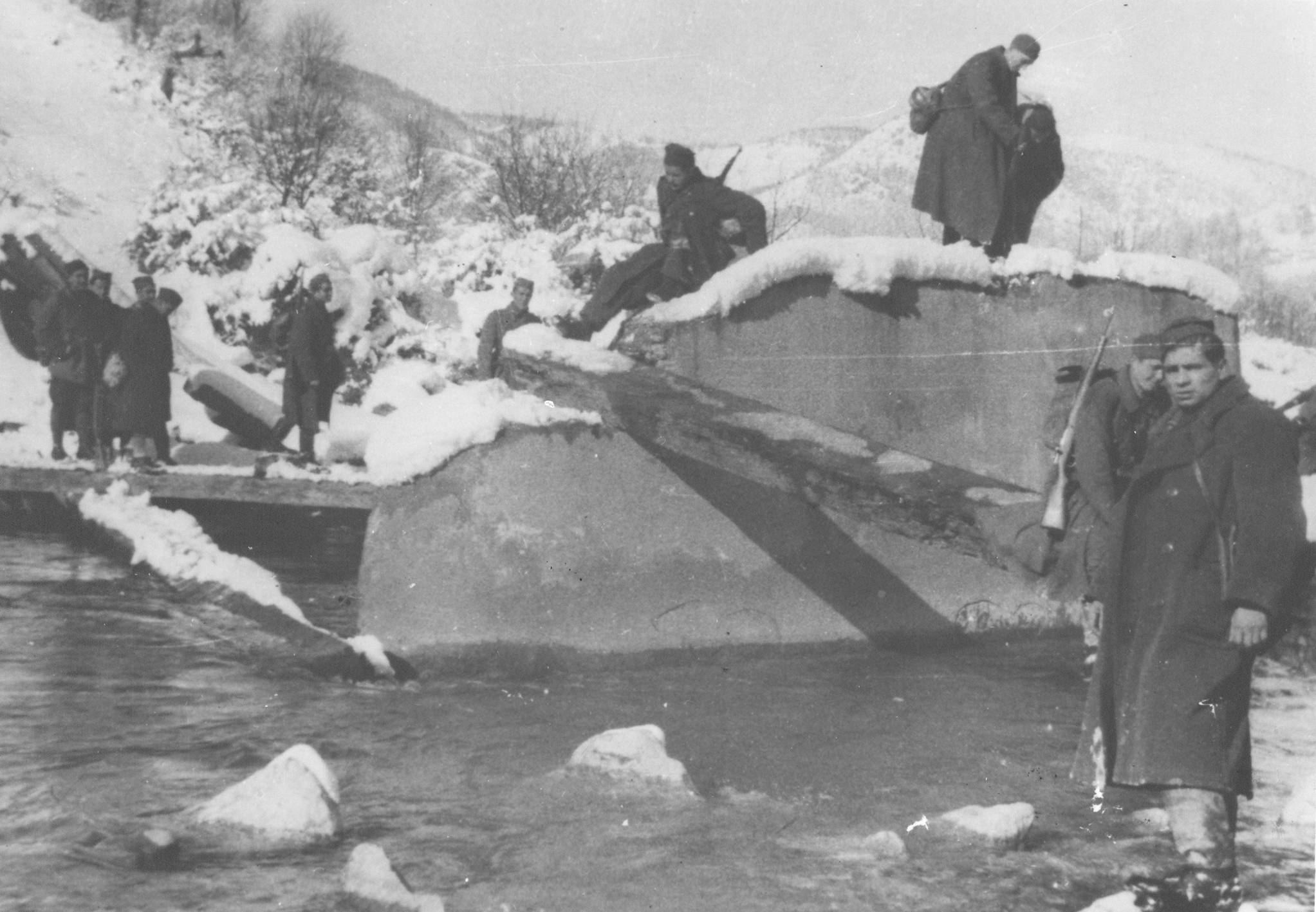
Soldiers of the 16th Muslim Brigade cross the Drinjača river during the Kugelblitz / Schneesturm operations, December 1943

The Brigade would be significantly engaged in December 1943 by the German counter-insurgent operation ‘Kugelblitz’ and its follow-up operation ‘Schneesturm’ designed to encircle and destroy large partisan forces in eastern Bosnia, during the course of which it would counter-attack and capture the town of Kladanj, and escape the encirclement along with the rest of its division. In January 1944 it would participate in the failed partisan offensive to re-capture Tuzla.

Throughout the rest of 1944, from 15 March 1944 onward as part of the 27th East Bosnia Division, it was engaged at various times, sometimes by the Handschar Division of the Waffen SS, and also engaged the SS Prinz Eugen Division and various Ustaše and Chetnik forces. In September 1944 some Bosnians of the Handschar division even defected to the ranks of the 16th Muslim Brigade.

In March and April 1945, it participated in the Sarajevo Operation, with the brigade being the one to capture Sarajevo itself from retreating German and collaborationist forces. In April and May 1945 it fought in the Battle of Odžak against Ustaše forces; Odžak was the final battle of the European theatre of World War II.

== Gallery ==
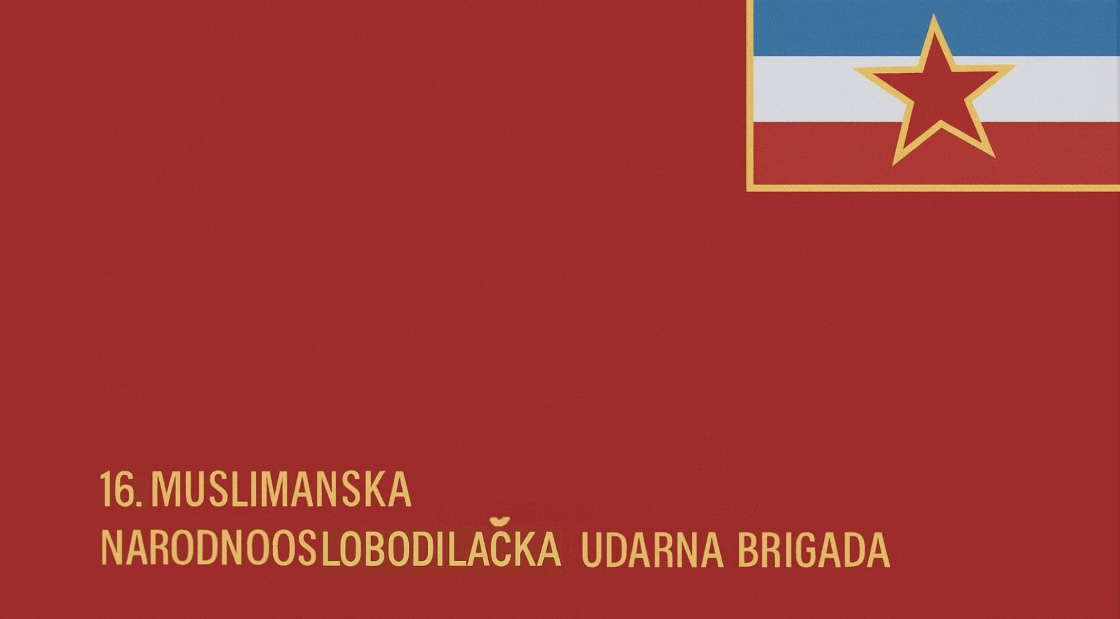
Flag of the 16th Muslim Brigade

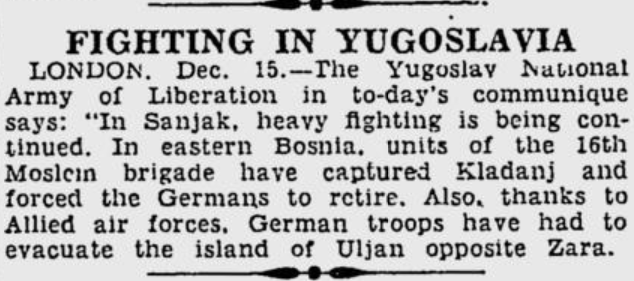
15 December 1943 London news report on the capture of Kladanj by the 16th Muslim Brigade from the Germans during Operation ‘Kugelblitz’, as published in "The Indian Express"

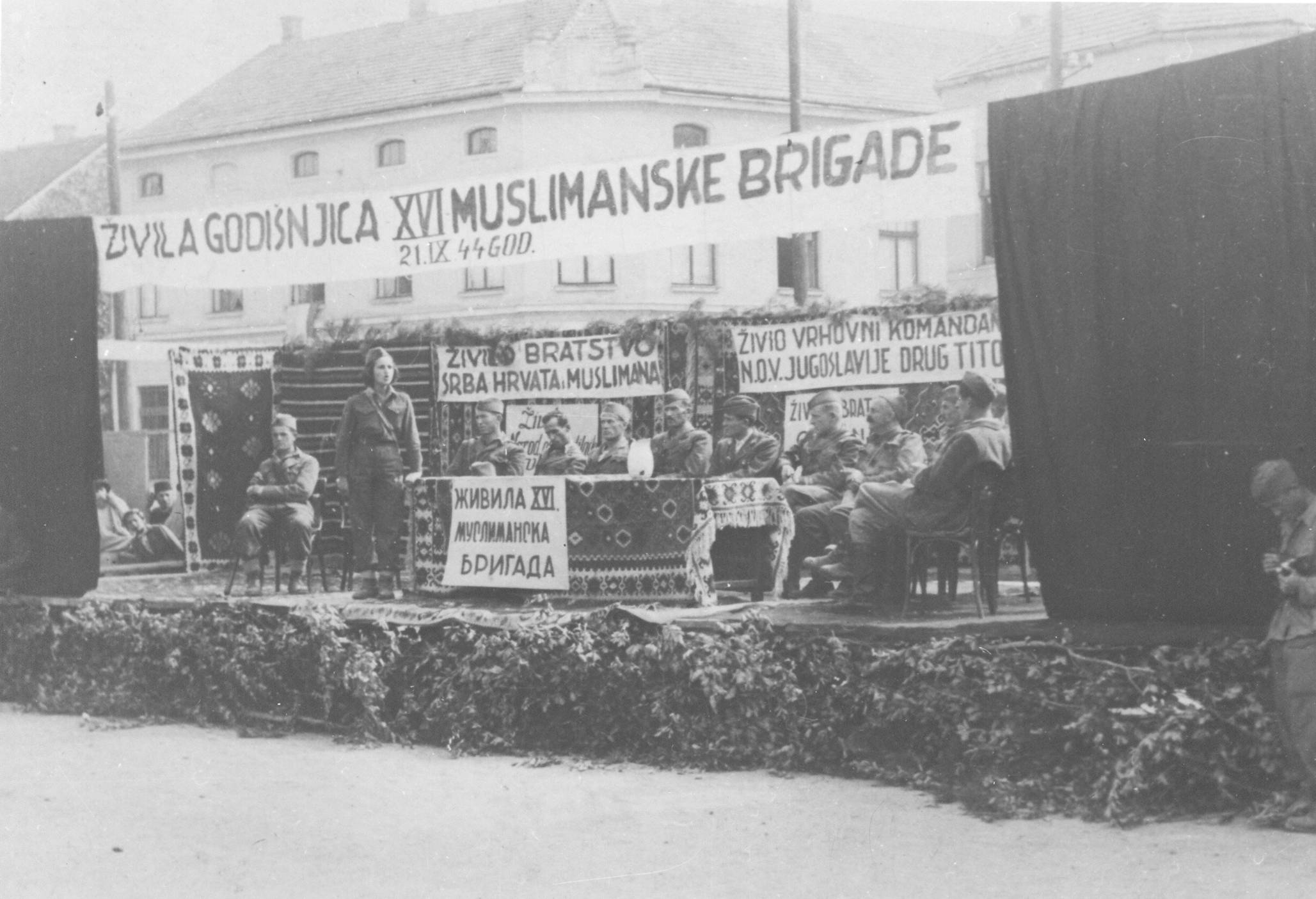
The one year anniversary of the formation of the 16th Muslim Brigade in Tuzla, 21 September 1944

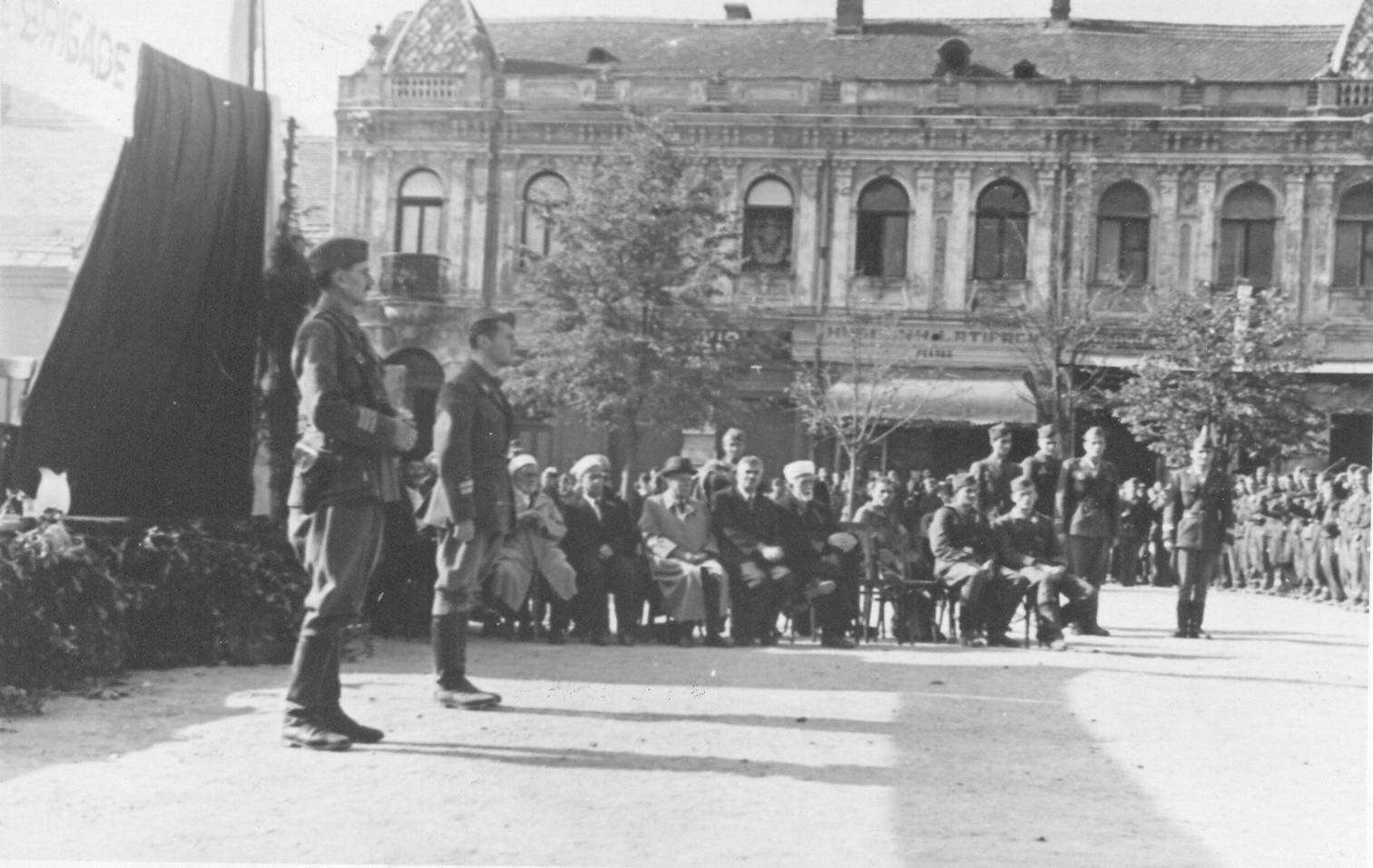
From the celebration of the anniversary of the formation of the 16th Muslim Brigade in Tuzla, attended by Islamic clerics, September 1944

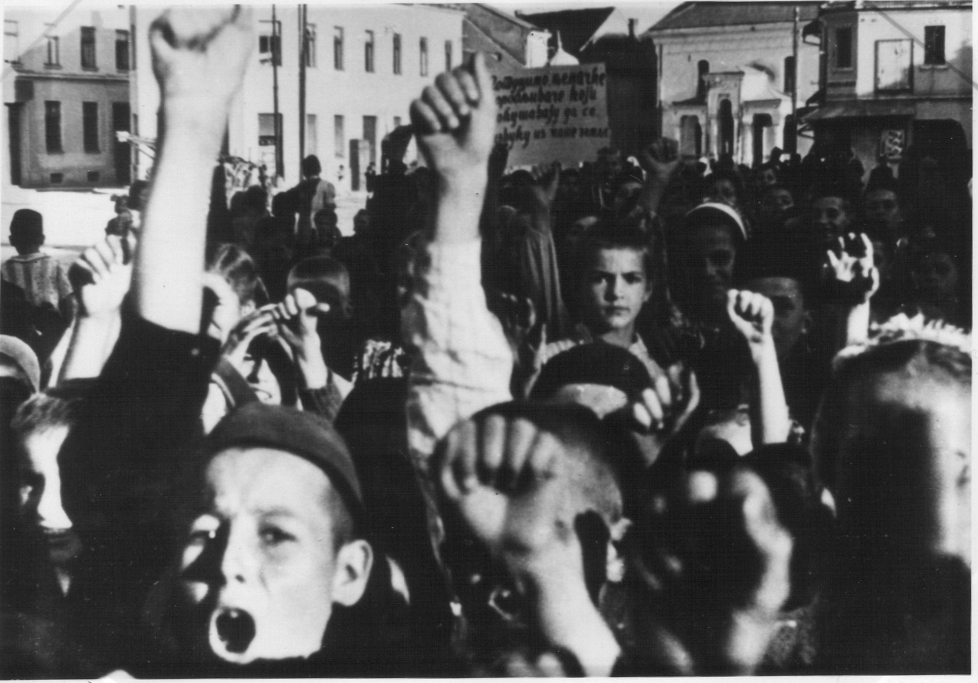
Bosnian children in Tuzla celebrate the anniversary of the 16th Muslim Brigade’s formation, 1944

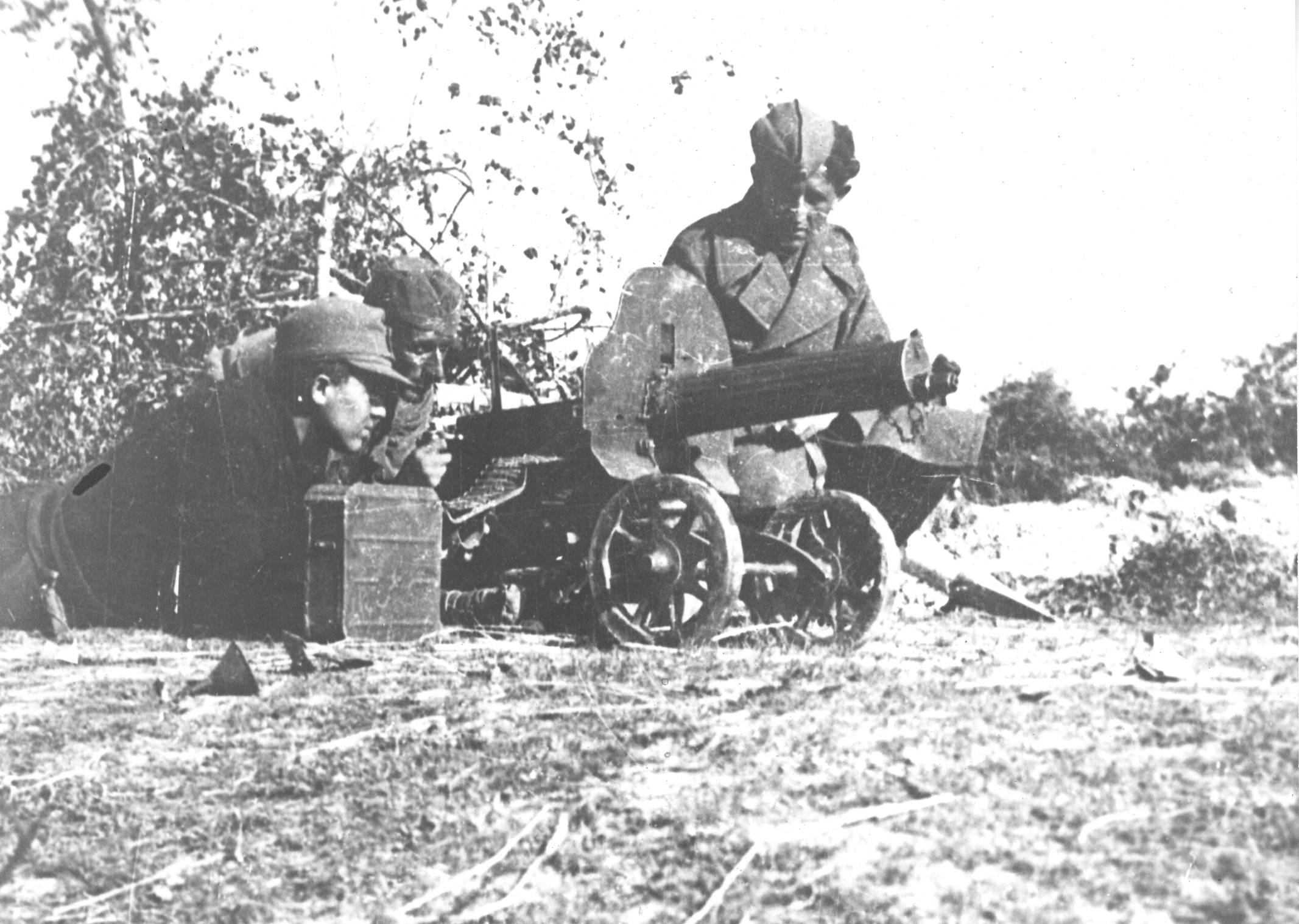
Machine gun crew from the 4th Battalion of the 16th Muslim Brigade during the Battle of Odžak, May 1945
