= Kosta Nađ =

Yugoslav general (1911–1986)

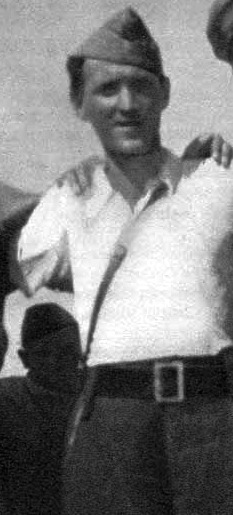
- Born: 13 May 1911; Petrovaradin, Croatia-Slavonia, Austria-Hungary (now Serbia)
- Died: 19 November 1986 (aged 75); Belgrade, SR Serbia, Yugoslavia (now Serbia)
- Military career
- Allegiance: Yugoslavia
- Branch: Yugoslav People's Army
- Service years: 1941–1974
- Rank: General of the Army
- Conflicts: Spanish Civil War; World War II
- Awards: Order of Freedom; Order of the National Hero

Konstantin "Kosta" Nađ (Hungarian: Nagy Koszta; 13 May 1911 – 19 November 1986) was a Yugoslav Partisan army general, Hero of Socialist Labour of the Soviet Union, Hero of the Yugoslav Peoples, and a general of the post-war Yugoslav People's Army who commanded Partisan units during World War II in Yugoslavia. Before the war, Nađ fought in the Spanish Civil War. He is considered one of the best military leaders of WWII, and led the Yugoslav 3rd and 4th Armies driving the Axis out of Yugoslavia, entered Austria and Trieste and was the highest ranked officer involved in Bleiburg Repatriations.

== Biography ==
Born on 13 May 1911 in Petrovaradin, Kingdom of Croatia-Slavonia, he fought as a volunteer in the Spanish Civil War (1936–1939), and also played a prominent part in World War II in Yugoslavia.

His 3rd Army advanced through Yugoslavia and into Austria before the war ended. He was president of the Yugoslav Partisans' veteran association from 1974 to 1981. He died in Belgrade on 19 November 1986, aged 75.

== Commands ==
He held the following duties:

- General Officer Commanding I Bosnian Corps - 1942 to 1943
- General Officer Commanding III Corps - 1943 to 1944
- General Officer Commanding 1st Army - January 1945
- General Officer Commanding 3rd Army - February 1945
