= 4th Division (Yugoslav Partisans) =

4th Krajina Division
- Flag of Democratic Federal Yugoslavia (used by the Partisans)
- Active: 1942–1945
- Country: Democratic Federal Yugoslavia
- Branch: Yugoslav Partisan Army
- Type: Infantry
- Size: 4,371 (upon formation)
- Part of: 1st Bosnian Corps (9 November 1942 - 11 May 1943); 2nd Bosnian Corps (11 May 1943 - 1945)
- Engagements: World War II in Yugoslavia

Commanders
- Notable commanders: Josip Mažar Šoša

The 4th Krajina Division (Serbo-Croatian Latin: Četvrta krajiška divizija) was a Yugoslav Partisan division formed in Glamočko polje on 9 November 1942. On the day of formation it consisted of 4,371 soldiers in three brigades: 2nd Krajina Brigade, 5th Krajina Brigade and 6th Krajina Brigade. Commander of the division was Josip Mažar Šoša, while its political commissar was Milinko Kušić. During the war it mostly operated in western and central Bosnia. It was a part of 1st Bosnian Corps until 11 May 1943 when it became part of 2nd Bosnian Corps.

It took heavy losses during Operation Weiss.
