= 10th Division (Yugoslav Partisans) =

10th Krajina Assault Division
- Flag of Democratic Federal Yugoslavia (used by the Partisans)
- Active: 1943–1945
- Country: Democratic Federal Yugoslavia
- Branch: Yugoslav Partisan Army
- Type: Infantry
- Size: ~700 (upon formation); 7,973 (May 1945)
- Part of: 3rd Corps (until 14 May 1943); 4th Corps
- Engagements: World War II in Yugoslavia

Commanders
- Notable commanders: Milorad Mijatović

The 10th Krajina Assault Division (Serbo-Croatian Latin: Deseta krajiška udarna divizija) was a Yugoslav Partisan division formed on 13 February 1943. It was formed from the 10th Krajina Assault Brigade, Ribnik Detachment and a few smaller detachments. The division numbered around 700 soldiers when it was formed and it grew to 7,973 by May 1945. It was a part of the 3rd Corps until 14 May 1943 when it became a part of the 5th Corps. The division participated in all of the defensives and offensives of the 5th Corps. Milorad Mijatović commanded the division and its political commissar was Nikola Kotle.
