= 27th Division (Yugoslav Partisans) =

27th East Bosnia Division
- Flag of Democratic Federal Yugoslavia (used by the Partisans)
- Active: 1944–1945
- Country: Democratic Federal Yugoslavia
- Branch: Yugoslav Partisan Army
- Type: Infantry
- Size: Division
- Part of: Partisan 3rd Corps; Partisan 2nd Army
- Engagements: World War II in Yugoslavia * Operation Maiglöckchen * Operation Fliegenfänger * Operation Hackfleisch

Commanders
- Notable commanders: Pero Kosorić; Miloš Zekić

The 27th East Bosnia Division (Serbo-Croatian Latin: Dvadesetsedma istočno-bosanska divizija) was a Yugoslav Partisan division that fought against the Germans, Independent State of Croatia (NDH) and Chetniks in occupied Yugoslavia during World War II.

As part of the Partisan 3rd Corps it spent most of 1944 engaged in hard fighting against the 13th Waffen Mountain Division of the SS Handschar (1st Croatian) in eastern Bosnia.

Among its sub-units was (from March 1944 to May 1945) the 16th Muslim Brigade.
