= 11th Division (Yugoslav Partisans) =

Division

11th Krajina Division
- Flag of Democratic Federal Yugoslavia (used by the Partisans)
- Active: 1944–1945
- Country: Democratic Federal Yugoslavia
- Branch: Yugoslav Partisan Army
- Type: Infantry
- Size: Division
- Part of: 3rd Corps (Yugoslav Partisans); 12th Corps (Yugoslav Partisans); 1st Army (Yugoslav Partisans)
- Engagements: World War II in Yugoslavia * Operation Hackfleisch * Belgrade Offensive * Syrmian Front

The 11th Krajina Division (Serbo-Croatian Latin: Jedanaesta krajiška divizija) was a Yugoslav Partisan division that fought against the Germans, Independent State of Croatia (NDH) and Chetniks in occupied Democratic Federal Yugoslavia during World War II. The term krajiška in its name refers to Bosanska Krajina.

The division was formed on 1 May 1943, with 5th and 12th Krajina Brigade in its composition. It was subordinated to the 2nd Bosnia Corps, and on 19 July 1943 it was re-subordinated to 2nd Bosnia (later: Third) Corps.

As part of the 3rd Corps it spent August 1944 engaged in hard fighting against the 13th Waffen Mountain Division of the SS Handschar (1st Croatian) in eastern Bosnia.
