= Slavko Rodić =

Yugoslav partisan and general

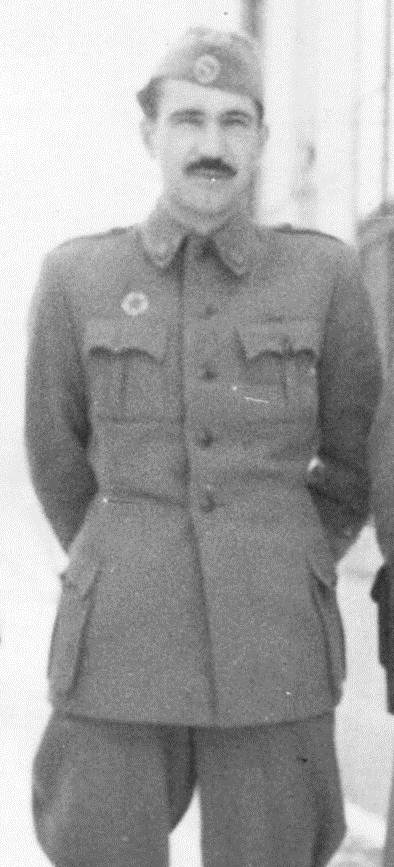
- Slavko Rodić in Jajce 1944
- Born: 7 July 1918; Sredice, Austro-Hungary
- Died: 29 April 1949 (aged 30); Belgrade, Yugoslavia
- Military career
- Allegiance: Democratic Federal Yugoslavia, Federal People's Republic of Yugoslavia
- Service years: 1941–1949
- Rank: Lieutenant General
- Units: 5th Krajina Division; 5th Bosnian Corps
- Conflicts: World War II in Yugoslavia: Drvar uprising; Operation Weiss; 1st Banja Luka Operation; Sarajevo Operation

Slavko Rodić (Serbian: Славко Родић; Sredice near Ključ, 7 July 1918 – Belgrade, 29 April 1949), was a Yugoslav partisan, general of Yugoslav People's Army and People's Hero of Yugoslavia.

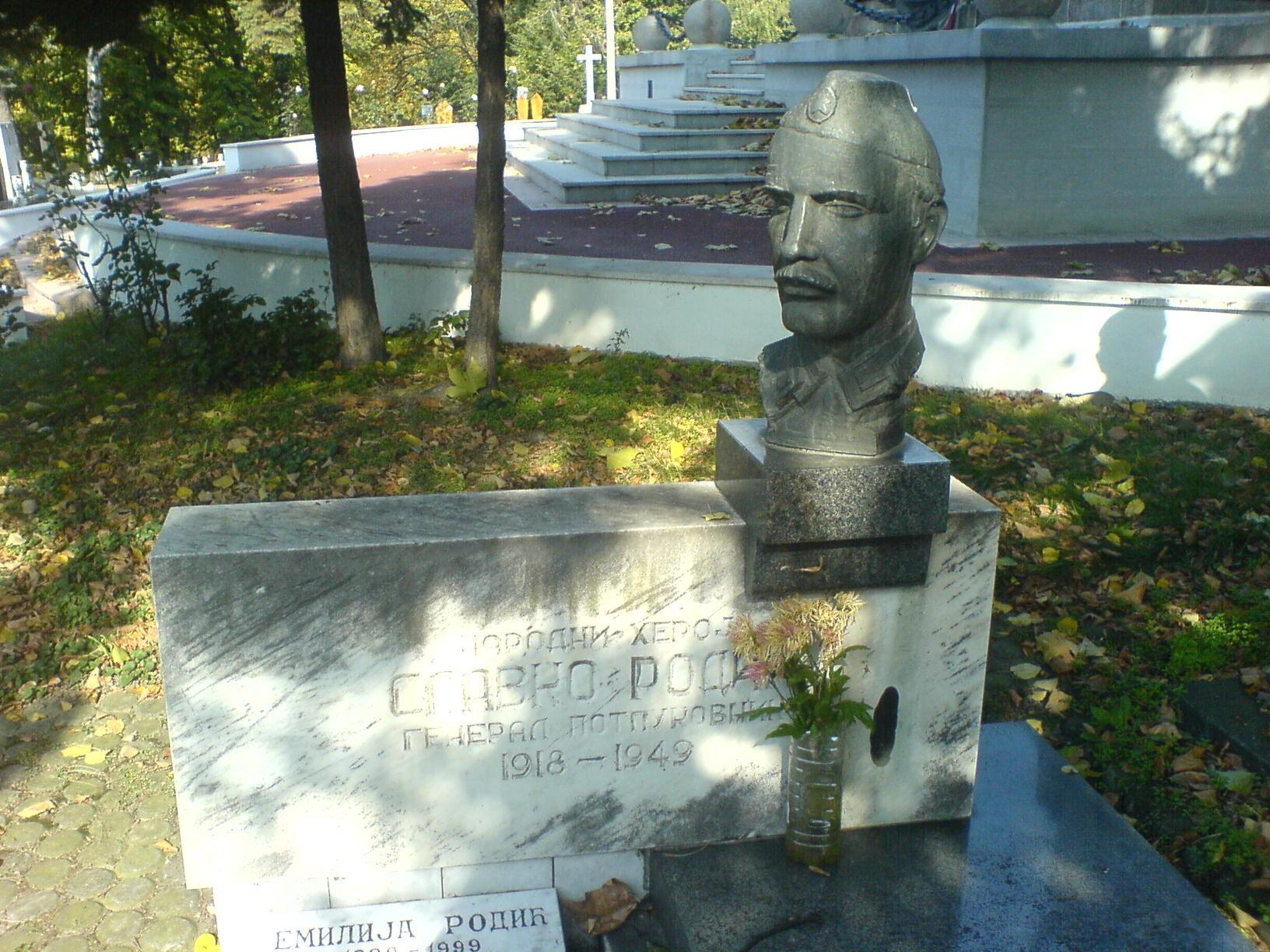
Grave of Slavko Rodić in Belgrade

Prior to April War, Rodić, an ethnic Serb from Krajina, worked as surveyor for Royal Yugoslav Army in Vršac. After Yugoslav defeat, he returned to Krajina. There he joined local communist in their preparation for uprising against Independent State of Croatia and Axis occupation.

During 1943 and 1943, he was commander of 5th Krajina Division, and then 5th Bosnian Corps. He was promoted to major general in 1943, at age 27, thus becoming the youngest general of People's Liberation Army.

After death of General Arso Jovanović in 1948 was promoted to deputy chief of staff of Yugoslav Army HQ. However, he too died soon, on 29 April 1949.
