= 1st Army (Yugoslav Partisans) =

- Active: 1 January 1945
- Country: (Democratic Federal Yugoslavia) Yugoslavia
- Branch: Yugoslav Partisans
- Type: Field Army
- Engagements: World War II: Syrmian Front

Commanders
- Notable commanders: General Lieutenant Peko Dapčević

The 1st Army of the Yugoslav Partisans was a Partisan army that operated in Yugoslavia during the last months of the Second World War.

The Army was created on 1 January 1945, along with the 2nd and 3rd Armies, when Chief Commander Marshal Josip Broz Tito converted the guerrilla National Liberation Army and Partisan Detachments of Yugoslavia in a more regular Yugoslav Army.

== History ==
As commander was named General lieutenant Peko Dapčević, as Political Commissioner Mijalko Todorović, and as Chief of staff, Savo Drljević.
The Army was first formed from the 1st Proletarian Corps (1st, 5th, 6th, 11th, and 21st Divisions), and on 3 April the 15th Corps (42nd and 48th Divisions) and several independent divisions and brigades (22nd, 2nd, 17th Divisions and 2nd Tank Brigade) were added. The 1st Army had some 60,000 combatants in mid-April 1945.

It first fought on the Syrmian Front, and after its breakthrough in mid-April, liberated the western part of Yugoslavia with other units of the Yugoslav army. It liberated Zagreb on May 8, together with parts of the 2nd Army. Then, with four divisions, it liberated northern Slovenia, encircled and captured the enemy Army and reached the Austrian border on 13 May. There, along with units of the 2nd and 3rd Armies and 4th Operational Zone, it participated in the last battles of World War II on European soil, more than a week after the German surrender on 8 May.

== Sources ==
- This is a translation of the article in the Slovenian Wikipedia, 1. armada (NOVJ).
