= 38th Division (Yugoslav Partisans) =

38th East Bosnia Division
- Flag of Democratic Federal Yugoslavia (used by the Partisans)
- Active: 1944–1945
- Country: Democratic Federal Yugoslavia
- Branch: Yugoslav Partisan Army
- Type: Infantry
- Size: Division
- Part of: Partisan 3rd Corps; Partisan 2nd Army
- Engagements: World War II in Yugoslavia * Operation Hackfleisch

The 38th East Bosnia Division (Serbo-Croatian Latin: Tridesetosma istočnobosanska divizija) was a Yugoslav Partisan division that fought against the Germans, Independent State of Croatia (NDH) and Chetniks in occupied Democratic Federal Yugoslavia during World War II. As part of the Partisan 3rd Corps it spent the latter half of 1944 engaged in hard fighting against the 13th Waffen Mountain Division of the SS Handschar (1st Croatian) in eastern Bosnia.
