= Italia Brigade (Yugoslavia) =

- Flag of the Yugoslav-Italian minority which was used by the Brigade
- Active: (Garibaldi battalion) 11 September 1943–7 July 1945
- Country: (Italy) Kingdom of the South-AMGOT
- Branch: National Liberation Army (Yugoslavia)
- Type: Infantry
- Role: foot infantry
- Size: c.5,000 (post-war)
- Engagements: World War II: Syrmian Front

Commanders
- Notable commanders: Giuseppe Maras

The Italia Brigade was a formation of the National Liberation Army of Yugoslavia during the Second World War which was formed from Italian soldiers. After the war concluded it reached divisional status before being disbanded soon after.

== History ==
After the Armistice of Cassibile, which was signed on 3 September 1943, the division was organized by Italian soldiers from the disbanded Second Army of Italy and Italians were recruited into the National Liberation Army. The Italian armed force Brigade Italia was formed in Belgrade on 28–29 October 1944 among the 1st Division (Yugoslav Partisans) under command of Koča Popović; its core was made up of two battalions: Garibaldi battalion formed on 11 September 1943 in Split, Croatia and Matteotti battalion formed in October 1943 in Livno. Other Italians, freed from German concentration camps, joined the brigade forming the third Mameli battalion and before leaving Belgrade for the Syrmian Front 2,283 soldiers had joined. The fourth Bandiera brothers battalion was later added.

== Composition ==
The brigade was formed initially by four battalions with soldiers of varied political ideologies:

- Giuseppe Garibaldi was formed by communists on 11 September 1943.
- Giacomo Matteotti was formed by socialists in October 1943.
- Goffredo Mameli was formed by republicans and anarchists during 1944.
- Bandiera brothers was formed by liberals and monarchists during 1944.

The Italia Brigade was led by sub-lieutenant Giuseppe Maras; later the full division was formed by twelve battalions. Only a small part of the fighters were totalitarian or communists, while the majority fought for a democratic Yugoslavia.

== War operation ==
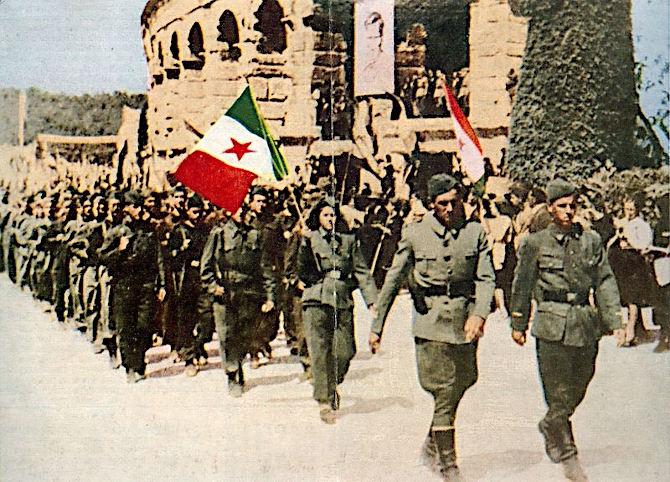
Photo taken on 8th of May in 1945, when the battalion entered the liberated town of Pula, Yugoslavia

During the summer of 1943, Garibaldi battalion defended Split against Germans and their Yugoslav allies. Three times Garibaldi and Matteotti, risked annihilation from long range and long lasting German offensives. They earned the praise of the Yugoslav Partisan supreme commander Josip Broz Tito and frequent citations in the bulletins of the BBC World Service radio broadcast. After the breakthrough on the Syrmian Front, Brigade Italia pursued the enemy towards Zagreb and participated in the conquest of Belgrade. Italian fighters raised the flag of democratic Italy at the Italian embassy in Belgrade. Political commissioner Innocente Cozzolino temporarily served as Italian consul. Tito wanted the Italian battalions in first row of the parade in front of him to the liberator departments. On 8 May 1945 Italian fighting units entered Zagreb after other hard fighting sustained in Tovarnik, Pleternica, and Slijem mountain. Following the end of the war on 7 May, the brigade became a division with about 5,000 fighters in twelve battalions.

== Dissolution ==
Division Italia returned to Italy on 2 July 1945 and on 7 July 1945 the unit was dissolved. Commander Maras was awarded with Gold Medal of Military Valour by the President of Italian Republic in 1968.
