= Sredice =

Sredice Средице
- Village
- Location within Bosnia and Herzegovina
- Coordinates: 44°24′11″N 16°49′37″E
- Country: Bosnia and Herzegovina
- Entity: Republika Srpska
- Municipality: Ribnik
- Time zone: UTC+1 (CET)
  - Summer (DST): UTC+2 (CEST)

Sredice (Cyrillic: Средице) is a village in the municipality of Ribnik, Bosnia and Herzegovina.

== Notable residents ==
- Slavko Rodić
