= 5th Corps (Yugoslav Partisans) =

The 5th Bosnian Corps (Serbo-Croatian Latin: Peti bosanski udarni korpus) was a Yugoslav Partisan corps that fought against the Germans, Independent State of Croatia (NDH) and Chetniks in occupied Democratic Federal Yugoslavia during World War II.

It was first created on 11 May 1943 as the 2nd Bosnian Corps from the 1st Bosnian Corps, together with the 5th Division. Virtually all units of the 1st Bosnian Corps were transferred to the 2nd Bosnian Corps including the 4th, 10th and 11th Krajina divisions for a total of around 7,500 soldiers. Its commander was Slavko Rodić and its Political Commissar Veljo Stojnić.

The 2nd Bosnian Corps was ordered to move to eastern Bosnia. Its adversary, the German 369th, 373rd, 114th and 7th SS divisions, together with NDH forces and local Chetniks had over 160,000 soldiers. This forced the 2nd Bosnian Corps to conduct guerrilla warfare and avoid open battles.

On 5 October 1943 the Corps was renamed the 5th (Bosnian) Corps. It kept fighting in Bosnia, carried out the Banja Luka operation, and in May 1944 helped resist the German Seventh Offensive around Drvar. In the final offensive in 1945, it participated in the final liberation of many places in western and central Bosnia.

In the last phase of the war the 5th Corps participated in the Sarajevo Operation attacking north of the city to cut off the escape routes of the German garrison. The mission was not completely successful as the bulk of the enemy forces managed to fall back to the north-west. But elements of the Corps were able to enter liberated Sarajevo, together with the other partisan formations of the 2nd and 3rd Corps.

The 5th Corps was disbanded on 22 April 1945 and its divisions were added to the 2nd Army.

== Sources ==
- vojska.net
