= Battle of Odžak =

Last European World War II battle

- Part of European theatre of World War II and World War II in Yugoslavia
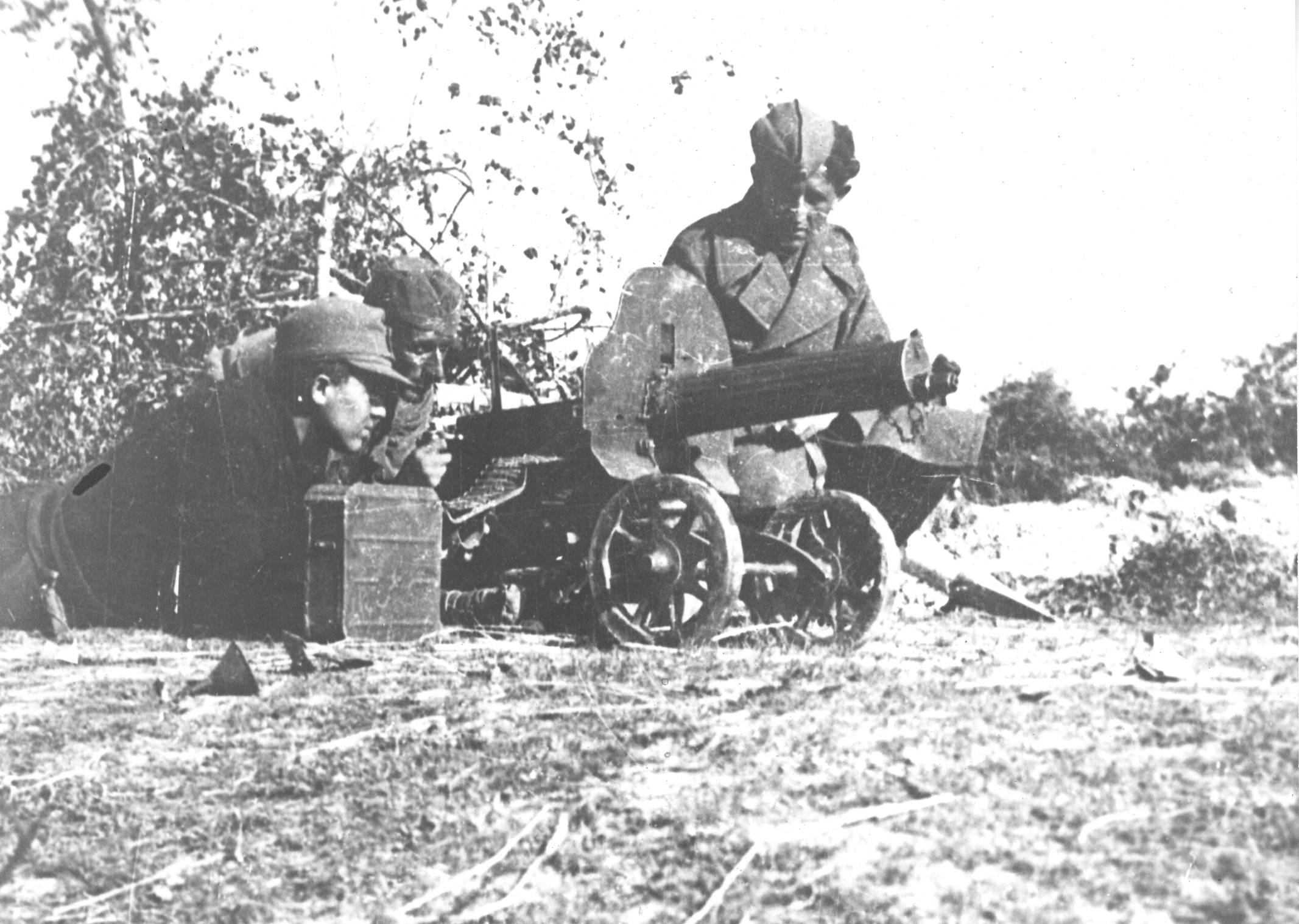
- 16th Muslim Brigade machine gunners during the battle in May 1945
Date	19 April – 25 May 1945 (1 month and 6 days)
Location	Odžak, Independent State of Croatia (present-day Bosnia and Herzegovina) 45.0535°N 18.3217°E
Result	Partisan victory: Fall of the Independent State of Croatia

Belligerents
Yugoslavia	Independent State of Croatia

Commanders and leaders
Miloš Zekić; Spasoje Mičić	(Independent State of Croatia) Petar Rajkovačić † (Independent State of Croatia) Ivan Čalušić (executed)

Units involved
25th Division; 27th Division; 53rd Division	Unknown

Strength
23,000–35,000 soldiers	1,800–11,000 soldiers

Casualties and losses
430 killed	Almost all killed or captured
- Location within Yugoslavia

The Battle of Odžak was the last battle of World War II in Europe. The battle began on 19 April 1945 and lasted until 25 May 1945, 17 days after the end of the war in Europe. The combatants were the Axis-aligned Croatian Armed Forces, commanded by Petar Rajkovačić, and the Yugoslav Partisans, commanded by Miloš Zekić. The battle took place in the Bosnian town of Odžak, in the former country of Yugoslavia. The battle was a victory for the partisans.

The battle is thoroughly described in a number of books, for example, in a 1969 book on 53rd Division, 1981 book on 16th Muslim Brigade, 1983 book on 27th East Bosnian Division, and 1983 book on 14th Central Bosnian Brigade.

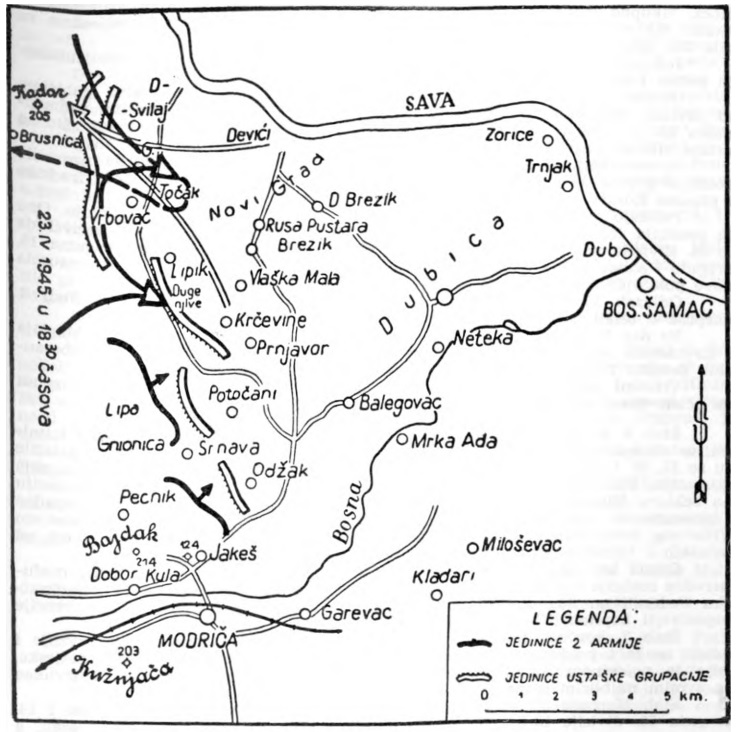
Operation "Vlaška Mala" from 23 to 28 April 1945.

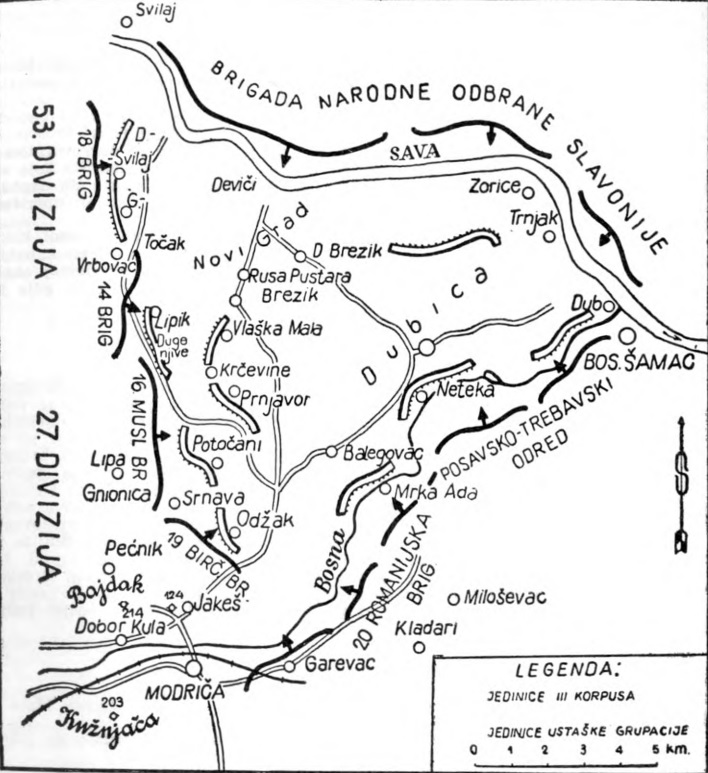
Operation "Vlaška Mala" on 22 May 1945

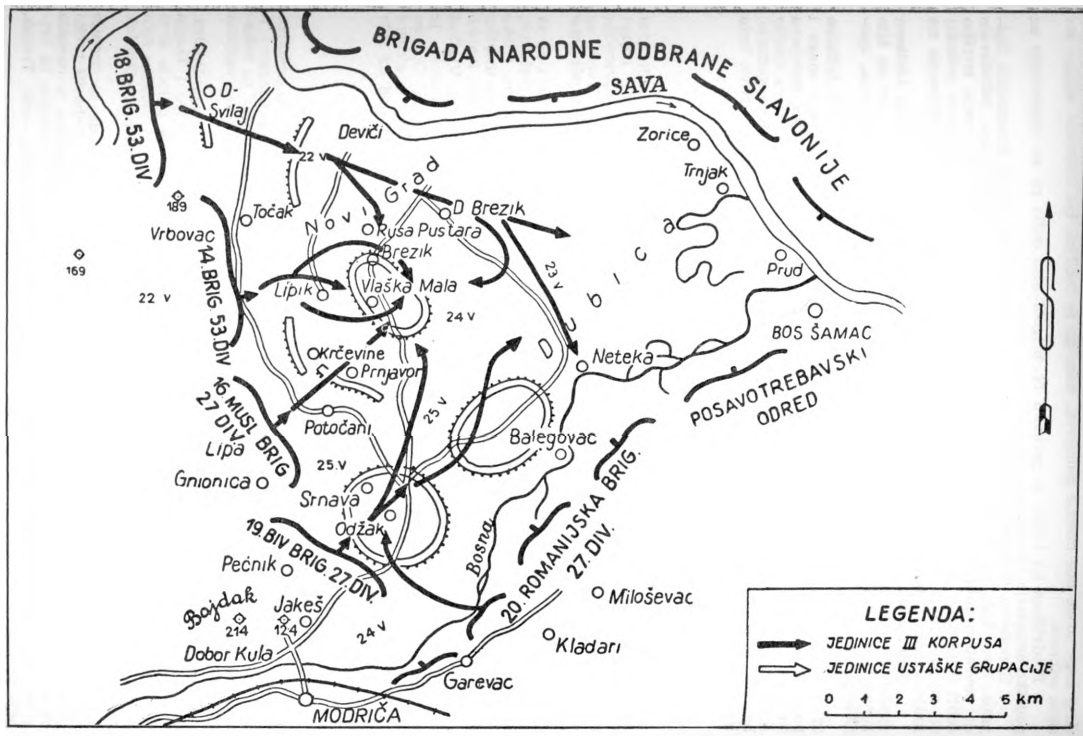
Operation "Vlaška Mala" from 22 to 25 May 1945.

== Aftermath ==
The Ustaše grouping encircled in the Podvučijak area was virtually destroyed. Due to the lack of preserved documentation, there are no precise data regarding the losses suffered by either side during the fighting, which—with interruptions—lasted from 19 April to 25 May, and possibly until 27–28 May 1945. According to historian Gaj Trifković, the total losses of the three Yugoslav divisions involved can be estimated at around 430 killed and missing, and 1,123 wounded. Trifković also notes that by the end of the battle at least 562 defenders of Odžak were captured. In his assessment, eyewitness accounts indicating that the prisoners of war were executed only a few days after their capture can be considered credible.

== Bibliography ==
- Ðonlagić, Ahmet (1983). 27. ISTOČNOBOSANSKA DIVIZIJA. Beograd: Vojnoizdavački zavod. Archived from the original on 25 June 2023.
- Đonlagić, Ahmet; Kazazović, Ćamil (1981). ŠESNAESTA MUSLIMANSKA NOU BRIGADA. Sarajevo: Istorijski arhiv. Archived from the original on 25 June 2023.
- Samardžija, Stevo (1983). 14. SREDNJOBOSANSKA NOU BRIGADA (PDF). Banja Luka: Skupština opštine Prnjavor. Archived from the original on 25 June 2023.
- Vukosavljević, Mladen; Karasijević, Drago (1969). 53. SREDNJOBOSANSKA NOU DIVIZIJA (PDF). Sarajevo: Zadrugar. Archived from the original on 16 October 2022.
- Đorić, Marjan (1996). Bosanska Posavina: povijesno-zemljopisni pregled (in Croatian). Polion.
- Trifković, Gaj (2022). Sea of Blood: A Military History of the Partisan Movement in Yugoslavia, 1941–45. Helion & Company. ISBN 978-1-914059-94-0.
