= 1st Corps (Yugoslav Partisans) =

1st Proletarian Corps
- Active: 5 October 1943 – 1 January 1945
- Country: (Democratic Federal Yugoslavia) Yugoslavia
- Branch: Yugoslav Partisans
- Type: Corps
- Engagements: World War II: Operation Rösselsprung; Belgrade operation; Syrmian Front

Commanders
- Notable commanders: Koča Popović; General Lieutenant Peko Dapčević

The 1st Proletarian Corps (Serbo-Croatian Latin: Prvi proleterski korpus) was a Yugoslav Partisan corps that fought against the Germans, Independent State of Croatia (NDH) and Chetniks in occupied Yugoslavia during World War II.

It was created on 5 October 1943 from the 1st Proletarian and 6th "Nikola Tesla" Divisions. On 15 September 1944 the "Operational Group of divisions" (5th, 17th and 21st Divisions) became also part of the 1st Corps. Its first commander was Koča Popović, succeeded in July 1944 by Peko Dapčević.

Until the middle of June 1944, the 1st (Proletarian) Corps operated in Western and Central Bosnia and Lika, where it fought heavy battles with units of the German 15th Mountain, 5th SS Mountain and 69th Corps. In 1943–1944, it participated in the Banja Luka Operation and Drvar Operation. In May 1944 it withstood the German Operation Rösselsprung (1944).
In August 1944 it made an attack over Zlatibor into Serbia and defeated the Chetniks at Maljen and Suvobor.
In autumn 1944, it fought in the Belgrade operation and then on the Syrmian Front.

On 1 January 1945 the 1st Corps was reformed into the 1st Army.

== Sources ==
- vojska.net
