= 20th Division (Yugoslav Partisans) =

20th Dalmatia Division
- Flag of the Federal State of Croatia, used by Croatian Partisans
- Active: 1943–1945
- Country: Democratic Federal Yugoslavia
- Branch: Yugoslav Partisan Army
- Type: Infantry
- Size: ~3,100 (upon formation)
- Part of: 8th Corps
- Engagements: World War II in Yugoslavia

Commanders
- Notable commanders: Velimir Knežević

The 20th Dalmatia Division (Serbo-Croatian Latin: Dvadeseta dalmatinska divizija) was a Yugoslav Partisan division formed in Vrdovo on 10 October 1943. It was formed from the 8th, 9th and 10th Dalmatia Brigades which had a total of around 3,100 soldiers at the time. It was a part of the 8th Corps during all of its existence. Commander of the division was Velimir Knežević and its political commissar was Živko Živković. The division mostly fought in Dalmatia, Bosnia and Herzegovina.
