= Green cadres (paramilitary) =

Green Cadres
- Zeleni kadar
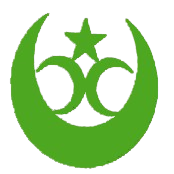
- "The patch of the Green Cadres and underneath the patch was the title: "Za din, Spremni!" ("For my Deen, Ready!")
- Leaders: Nešad Topčić, Ibrahim Pjanić
- Dates active: 1941–1945
- Headquarters: Sarajevo, Foča, Tuzla, Bihać
- Active regions: Bosnia and Herzegovina
- Ideology: Bosniak nationalism, Separatism
- Wars: World War II

People's Committee of the National Salvation of Bosniaks
- Bošnjački Odbor "Narodni spas"
- Formation: 26 August 1942
- Founder: Muhamed ef. Pandža
- Purpose: To protect the Bosniaks in the Independent State of Croatia and the establishment of their own government.
- Location: Bosnia and Herzegovina, Southeastern Europe

Green Cadres (paramilitary) (Bosnian: Zeleni kadar) was a Bosniak nationalist paramilitary force during World War II. It was founded in early December 1941 as a reaction to a massacre of Bosniak men and women carried out in Foča by the Serb Chetniks. The organisation was formed in poor conditions and was not supported at first by the Croatian puppet government. It rose to power after the Partisans started to burst deeper into Bosnia. Its leader was Nešad Topčić.

== History ==
On 5 December 1941 the Italians in agreement with the Chetnik commander Sergej Mihailović gave the city of Foča under Chetnik control, and the Bosniak populated parts of the town started organizing their own "Muslim Defense Force". The poorly armed defense units could not prevent the massacres of Bosniaks in the Podrinje area of Bosnia. After several attacks and massacres mainly against the civilians of that area, the prominent Bosniak leaders held a conference in Sarajevo on 28 August 1942 at which it was made clear that the NDH government was not doing anything in the defense of the Bosniak population in Bosnia and Herzegovina. That is why the prominent Bosniak leader Muhamed ef. Pandža made a statement that an immediate action of the NDH government is needed. They founded and proclaimed the "People's Committee of the National Salvation of Bosniaks" and the first tasks of the committee were to found the first Bosniak defense force after the fall of the Kingdom of Yugoslavia. Some of the members of the conference led by Topčić went to Berlin to request from the Germans the establishment of an autonomous Bosnia and Herzegovina. Another two meetings were held but did not get any successful results and the situation of the Bosniak population in NDH remained desperate.

== Statute ==
The conference also confirmed the statute of the defense forces. The statute contained many points but the main four that were related to the Green Cadres were:

1. Protection of Bosniak populated areas in Bosnia
2. Controlling the movement of Orthodox population in these areas
3. The planning and preparations of action of the Green Cadres need to be done with strict confidentiality.
4. Traitors will be executed.

== 1943 reorganization ==
After the Partisans carried out several attacks in northeast Bosnia and suffered big losses in men, the key officials supporting the militia left it and joined side with the Partisans or the NDH army. The biggest reason for the reorganization was the death of Muhamed Hadžiefendić and the destruction of his "Muslim-Volunteer" legion. The Green Cadres did not intend to be on any side but they were occasionally gifted with supplies which made them carry on. The organisation was present in most towns in Bosnia and its main purpose still was to protect the civilian population.

== End of the war ==
With the rapid advance of Tito's Partisans in 1945 it was clear that the NDH government together with other Axis factions would collapse with the capitulation of Germany in May 1945. Most of the Green Cadres units which still were under control of some town councils took over control in agreement with the Partisans. Some of the units of the Green Cadres joined the Partisans and together liberated some areas in Bosnia. Most famous was the help in the liberation of Sarajevo where parts of the Green Cadres were incorporated into the 16th Partisan Muslim Brigade.
