= 29th Division (Yugoslav Partisans) =

Yugoslav Partisan military division formed in 1944

29th Herzegovina Division
- Flag of Democratic Federal Yugoslavia (used by the Partisans)
- Active: 1943–1945
- Country: Democratic Federal Yugoslavia
- Allegiance: Yugoslav Partisans
- Branch: Yugoslav Partisan Army
- Type: Infantry
- Size: ~1,500 (upon formation); 7,500 in February 1945
- Engagements: World War II in Yugoslavia

Commanders
- Notable commanders: Vlado Šegrt

The 29th (Herzegovinian) Division (Serbo-Croatian: Dvadesetdeveta hercegovačka udarna divizija / Двадесетдевета херцеговачка ударна дивизија) was a Yugoslav Partisan division formed on 16 November 1943. It was formed from the 10th, 2nd and 3rd Herzegovinian Brigades which had a total strength of 1,567 fighters. Since its formation, the 29th Division was a part of the 2nd Corps.

== History ==
Until January 1945, it fought against units of the German V SS Mountain Corps, whose units were occupying Eastern Bosnia, Herzegovina and southern Dalmatia. Until the spring of 1944, Herzegovina was occupied by the 7th SS Mountain Division, which was then replaced by the 369th Legionary Division. Parts of the 118th Jäger Division from southern Dalmatia were also engaged in the actions. The Division took part in the Battle of Vukov Klanac in October 1944.

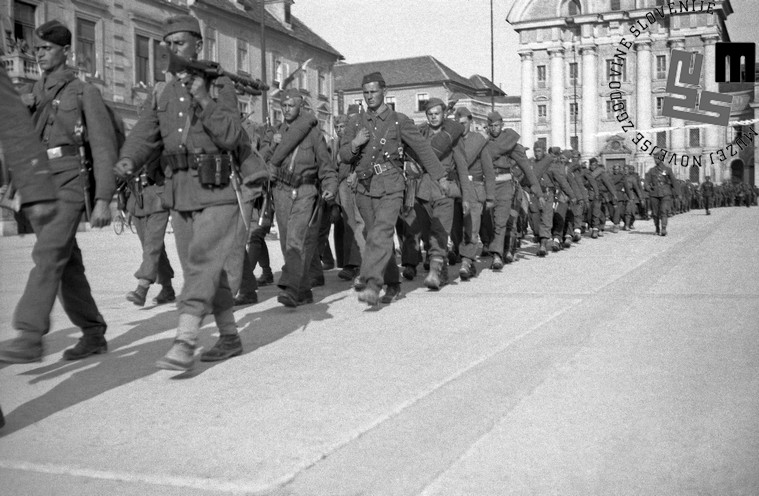
Yugoslav partisans entering Ljubljana

In 1945, the 29th Division fought in the Mostar operation, where it was subordinated to the headquarters of the 8th Corps, and in the Sarajevo Operation. From mid-April, the division was subordinated to the headquarters of the 4th Army, and participated in the Trieste Operation.
On 8 May the division, together with units of the Seventh Slovenian Corps, liberated Ljubljana.

== Links ==
Vojska.net
