= 2nd Army (Yugoslav Partisans) =

The 2nd Army of the Yugoslav Partisans was a Partisan army that operated in Yugoslavia during the last months of the Second World War.

The Army was created on 1 January 1945, when Chief Commander Marshal Josip Broz Tito converted the guerilla National Liberation Army and Partisan Detachments of Yugoslavia in a more regular Yugoslav Army.

== History ==
As commander was named General lieutenant Koča Popović, as Political Commissioner Blažo Lompar, and as Chief of staff, Ljubo Vučković.
The Army was first formed from the units of the Southern Operational Group of Divisions : the 14th Corps (23rd Serbian, 25th Serbian and 45th Serbian divisions) and the 1st Army Group (17th Eastern Bosnian and 28th Slavonian divisions). Later it also included in operational terms, the 2nd, 3rd and 5th Corps, which until then formed the Sarajevo Task Force.

Until April 1945, it operated in Northern Bosnia, between the 1st Army (north of the Sava) and the 4th Army (in Lika). In the final offensive for the liberation of Yugoslavia, it liberated a large part of Central and Western Bosnia and part of Croatia. It participated in the liberation of Zagreb on May 8 and part of Slovenia, where at the end of the war it captured a considerable number of enemy units, including the 7th SS Volunteer Mountain Division Prinz Eugen and 373rd (Croatian) Infantry Division.

== Sources ==
- This is a translation of the article in the Slovenian Wikipedia, 2. armada (NOVJ).
