= 39th Division (Yugoslav Partisans) =

Yugoslav Partisan military division formed in 1944

39th Krajina Division
- Flag of Democratic Federal Yugoslavia (used by the Partisans)
- Active: 1944–1945
- Country: Democratic Federal Yugoslavia
- Allegiance: Yugoslav Partisans
- Branch: Yugoslav Partisan Army
- Type: Infantry
- Size: ~3,400 (upon formation)
- Engagements: World War II in Yugoslavia

Commanders
- Notable commanders: Vojo Todorović Lerer

The 39th Krajina Division (Serbo-Croatian: Tridesetdeveta krajiška divizija / Тридесетдевета крајишка дивизија) was a Yugoslav Partisan division formed on 20 March 1944. It was formed from the 13th and 15th Krajina Brigades which in total had around 3,400 fighters. In October 1944, the 20th Krajina Brigade became part of the division. It was part of the 5th Corps and it operated in Bosnia, mostly the region of Bosanska Krajina.
