= 37th Division (Yugoslav Partisans) =

Yugoslav Partisan military division formed in 1944

37th Sandžak Division
- Flag of Democratic Federal Yugoslavia (used by the Partisans)
- Active: 1944–1945
- Country: Democratic Federal Yugoslavia
- Allegiance: Yugoslav Partisans
- Branch: Yugoslav Partisan Army
- Type: Infantry
- Size: ~2,300 (upon formation)
- Engagements: World War II in Yugoslavia

Commanders
- Notable commanders: Žarko Vidović; Čedomir Drulović

The 37th Sandžak Division (Serbo-Croatian: Tridesetsedma sandžačka divizija / Тридесетседма санџачка дивизија) was a Yugoslav Partisan division formed on 4 March 1944. It was formed from the 3rd Proletarian Sandžak, 4th Sandžak, and 8th Montenegro Brigades which had a total strength of around 2,300 fighters. The division was a part of the 2nd Corps.
