= Slovene Wikipedia =

Slovene-language edition of Wikipedia

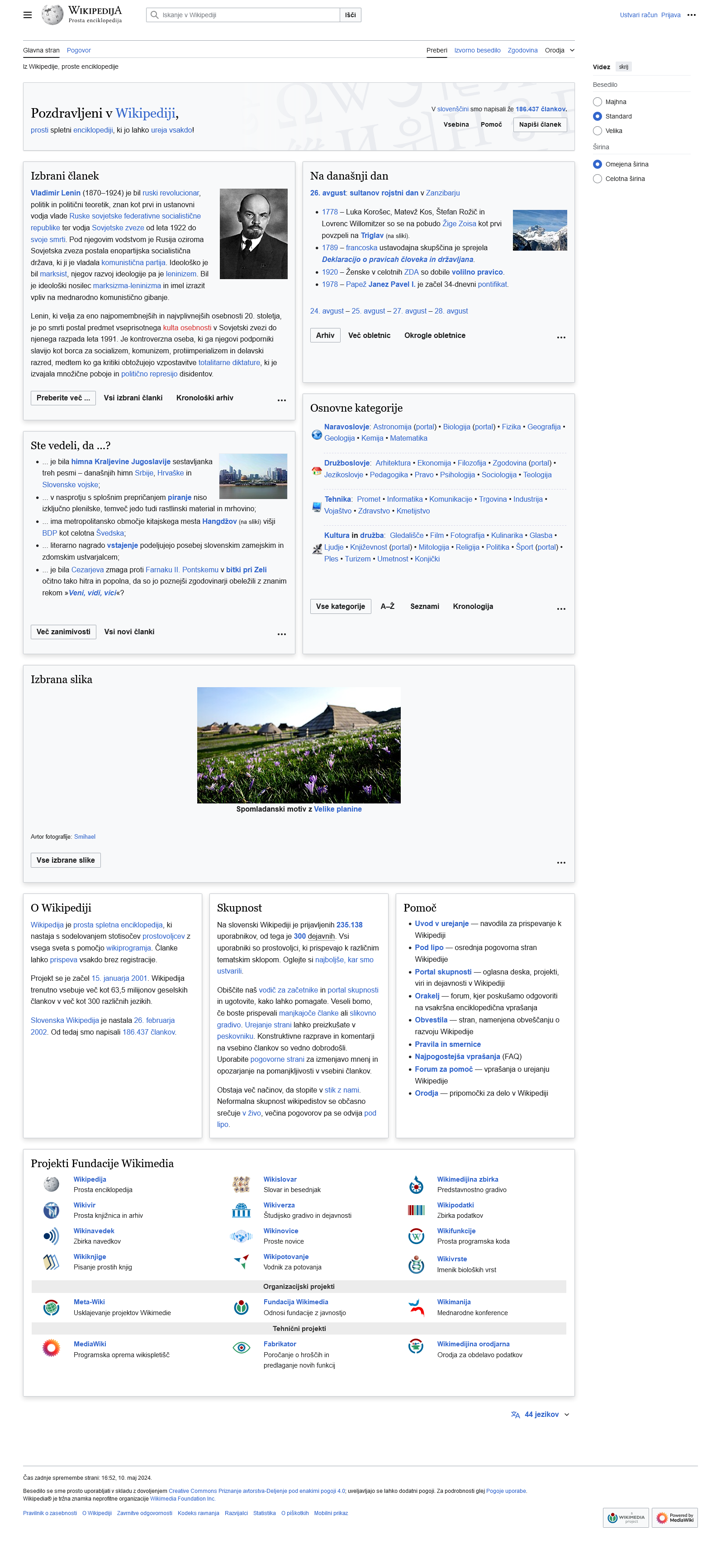
- Screenshot Slovene Wikipedia main page, 26 August 2024
- Website type: Internet encyclopedia project
- Available in: Slovene
- Headquarters: Miami, Florida
- Owner: Wikimedia Foundation
- Website: http://sl.wikipedia.org/
- Commercial: No
- Registration: Optional
- Launched: 26 February 2002; 24 years ago
- Content license: Creative Commons Attribution/ Share-Alike 4.0 (most text also dual-licensed under GFDL); Media licensing varies

The Slovene Wikipedia (Slovene: slovenska Wikipedija) is the Slovene-language edition of the free online encyclopedia Wikipedia. It has been active since 26 February 2002. On 15 August 2010, it reached 100,000 articles. As of 19 September 2026, it has 199,039 articles and is the 57th-largest Wikipedia.

Wikipedia is a widely used reference work and one of the most visited social networking services by users from Slovenia, but official internet usage statistics do not distinguish between Wikipedia editions, analyzing only the base domain wikipedia.org. In most cases, the Slovene-language edition gets a passing note of its existence in media reports about Wikipedia in general. However, as a relatively large and freely accessible body of structured knowledge, Slovene Wikipedia has been used, as an example, for building text corpora for the purpose of training linguistic software and analyzing Slovene literary authors' web presence. There are several successful collaboration projects with professors at the University of Ljubljana, using content creation by students as a teaching method. Since 2025, an active wikiclub is functioning in the same university, contributing to the growth of Slovene Wikipedia and contributing to the outreach of the Slovene Wikipedia in young people.

Active Wikipedians from Slovenia have also been featured in discussions about Wikipedia (both general and Slovene-language specific) in national media.

== Milestones ==
- 100 articles - 18 June 2002
- 1,000 articles - 30 September 2003
- 10,000 articles - 7 February 2005
- 20,000 articles - 17 December 2005
- 30,000 articles - 30 June 2006
- 40,000 articles - 15 February 2007
- 50,000 articles - 17 July 2007
- 100,000 articles - 15 August 2010
- 150,000 articles - 31 March 2016
