= Peko Dapčević =

Yugoslav partisan and politician (1913–1999)

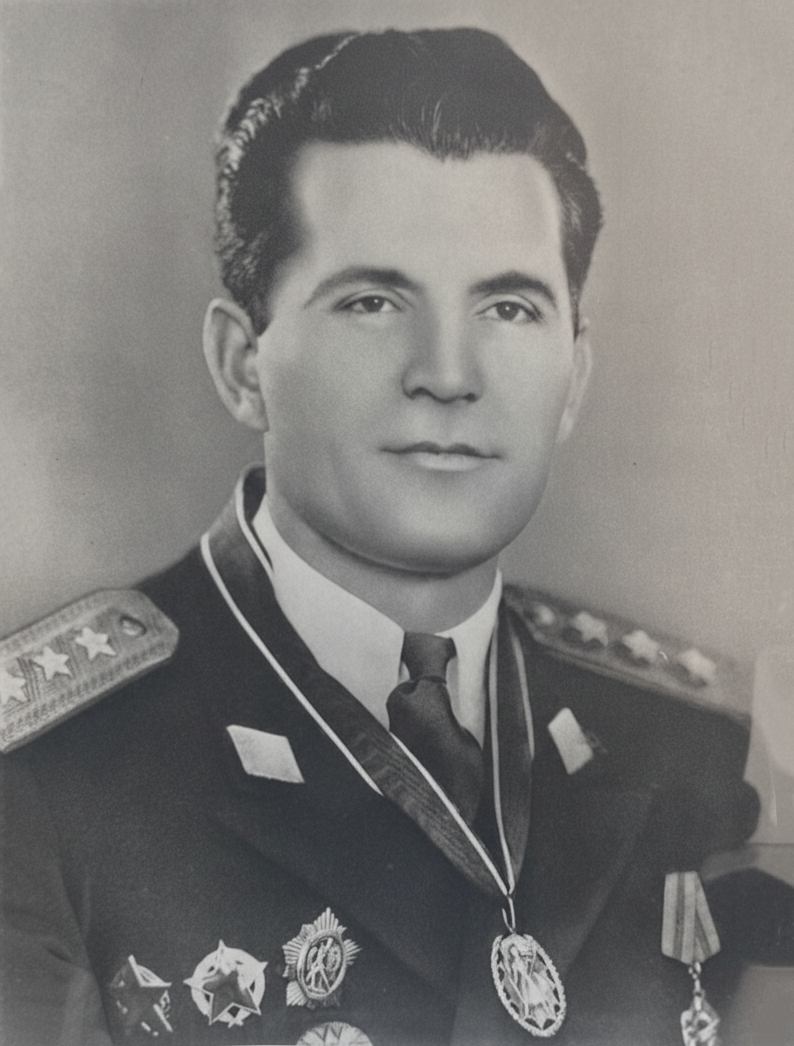
- Dapčević in 1947
- Born: Peko Dapčević; 25 June 1913; Cetinje, Montenegro
- Died: 10 February 1999 (aged 85); Belgrade, Serbia, FR Yugoslavia
- Burial place: Belgrade New Cemetery
- Spouse: Milena Dapčević
- Military career
- Allegiance: Spanish Republic; Socialist Federal Republic of Yugoslavia
- Branch: International Brigades; Yugoslav Partisans; Yugoslav People's Army; Yugoslav Ground Forces
- Service years: 1937–1939; 1941–1955
- Rank: Colonel General
- Units: XV International Brigade; 1st Proletarian Corps; First Yugoslav Army
- Conflicts: Spanish Civil War; World War II
- Awards: Order of the People's Hero; Order of the Hero of Socialist Labour; Order of National Liberation; Order of the War Banner; Order of Kutuzov, 1st class Order of Suvorov,1st class

Peko Dapčević (Serbo-Croatian Cyrillic: Пеко Дапчевић; 25 June 1913 – 10 February 1999) was a Yugoslav communist who fought as a volunteer in the Spanish Civil War, joined the Partisan uprising in Montenegro, and became commander of the Yugoslav 1st Proletarian Corps, 1st and 4th Armies.

Dapčević led the Partisan troops that, along with Soviet Red Army under General Vladimir Zhdanov, liberated Belgrade on October 20, 1944. He was the first person to be proclaimed as honorary citizen of Belgrade. He was also among the founders of FK Partizan, the football section of the Partizan Sports Society.

In 1953, Dapčević was named Chief of the Yugoslav General Staff, but was demoted as a result of being indirectly involved in the Milovan Đilas troubles with the party.

== Biography ==
Born June 25, 1913, in the area of Cetinje known as Ljubotinj, his father Jovan was an Orthodox deacon. He had one sister named Danica who was a public school teacher, and brothers Milutin (an officer in the Royal Yugoslav Army), Dragutin (Major of Yugoslav Armies) and Vlado who was a revolutionary, dissident and anti-revisionist.

Dapčević died February 10, 1999, at the age of 85 in Belgrade. He was buried at Belgrade New Cemetery.

Military offices
Preceded by Koča Popović	Chief of the General Staff of the Yugoslav People's Army; 27 January 1953 – 29 April 1955	Succeeded by Ljubo Vučković
Sporting positions
Preceded by Position established	President of KK Partizan; 1945–1947	Succeeded by Sveta Šaper
