= 2nd Corps (Yugoslav Partisans) =

The 2nd Assault Corps (Serbo-Croatian Latin: Drugi udarnički korpus) was a Yugoslav Partisan corps that fought against the Germans, Independent State of Croatia (NDH) and Chetniks in occupied Democratic Federal Yugoslavia during World War II.

== History ==
=== Formation ===
It was created on 10 October 1943 from the 2nd (Proletarian) and 3rd (Assault) Divisions. Later the 29th (Herzegovina) (Nov. 1943) and 37th (Sandžak) Divisions (Mar. 1944) and the Primorje Operational Group (Feb. 1944) were added.

=== Commanders ===
Its first commander was Peko Dapčević and political commissar was Mitar Bakić. From the end of July 1944, the commander was Radovan Vukanović.

=== Battles ===
The Corps fought in Montenegro, Sandžak and Herzegovina.

==== 1943-44 ====
In winter 1943-1944 it withstood the German Operation Kugelblitz. During the Andrijevica Operation (summer 1944), it defeated the 21st Waffen Mountain Division of the SS Skanderbeg. Later that year, it participated in the Durmitor Operation and liberated Montenegro, Sandžak and part of Herzegovina.

==== 1945 ====
In 1945, it fought in the Sarajevo Operation.

=== Disbandment ===
The 2nd Corps was disbanded on 25 April 1945 and its units transferred to the 2nd Army and 3rd Army.

== Sources ==
- vojska.net
