= 3rd Corps (Yugoslav Partisans) =

Partisan 3rd Corps
- Flag of Democratic Federal Yugoslavia (used by the Partisans)
- Active: 1942–1945
- Country: Democratic Federal Yugoslavia
- Branch: Yugoslav Partisan Army
- Type: Infantry
- Size: Corps
- Part of: Partisan 2nd Army
- Engagements: World War II in Yugoslavia * Operation Wegweiser * Operation Save * Operation Osterei * Operation Maibaum * Operation Maiglöckchen * Operation Vollmond * Operation Fliegenfänger * Operation Heiderose * Operation Hackfleisch; Sarajevo Operation

Commanders
- Notable commanders: Kosta Nađ; Vladimir Popović

The 3rd Corps (Serbo-Croatian Latin: treći korpus) was a Yugoslav Partisan corps that fought against the Germans, Independent State of Croatia (NDH) and Chetniks in occupied Democratic Federal Yugoslavia during World War II. It was created in November 1942 as the 1st Bosnian Corps, and underwent a name change in 1943. It grew in size until 1 January 1945 when it was subordinated to the Partisan 2nd Army. The 3rd Corps spent most of 1944 engaged in hard fighting against the 13th Waffen Mountain Division of the SS Handschar (1st Croatian) in eastern Bosnia.
