= 6th Division (Yugoslav Partisans) =

Yugoslav Partisan military division formed in 1942

6th Lika Division
- Flag of Democratic Federal Yugoslavia (used by the Partisans)
- Active: 1942–1945
- Country: Democratic Federal Yugoslavia
- Allegiance: Yugoslav Partisans
- Branch: Yugoslav Partisan Army
- Type: Infantry
- Size: 3,229 soldiers (upon formation)
- Part of: 4th Corps; 1st Corps
- Engagements: World War II in Yugoslavia

Commanders
- Notable commanders: Srećko Manola (November 1942 - March 1943); Đoko Jovanić (March 1943 - May 1945)

The 6th Proletarian Assault Lika Division "Nikola Tesla" (Šesta lička proleterska udarna divizija „Nikola Tesla”) was a Yugoslav Partisan division formed on 22 November 1942. It was formed from the 1st, 2nd, and 3rd Lika Brigades. On 11 November 1943, it became part of the 4th Corps and later a part of the 1st Corps. It operated in Dalmatia until November 1943 when it crossed into Bosnia, later it fought in Serbia and on the Syrmian Front. From October 1944, the 22nd Serbian Kosmaj Brigade also fought as part of the division, and in December 1944 an Artillery Brigade was formed within the division.

After its formation, it participated in the operations of the 1st Bosnian Corps in the lower course of the Una, and at the end of 1942 and early 1943 it carried out attacks on Italian, Ustaše and Chetnik garrisons in Lika and northern Dalmatia. During the initial phase of the Operation Weiss, it successfully led battles against strong Italian forces, to which it inflicted heavy losses in Lapačko polje. Then, together with the units of the 8th Kordun Division, it captured all enemy possessions in Lika, except for Gospić.

In November 1943, the division moved to Bosnia, where it took part in intensive combat operations against the enemy forces. It distinguished itself during Operation Rösselsprung when it rescued the Supreme Headquarters, on 25 May 1944. In September 1944, together with the 1st Proletarian Division, it managed to penetrate Serbia, took part in the defeat of the Chetnik Fourth Group of Assault Corps and weaker German parts, as well as the liberation of Valjevo and parts of western Serbia. In the Belgrade operation, in October 1944, it distinguished herself in breaking the resistance in the ministry buildings in Nemanjina Street and liberating Zemun. It took part in the fighting on the Syrmian Front, and after its breakthrough, together with the units of the 21st Serbia Division, it took part in the liberation of Đakovo and Slavonski Brod. Then it took part in the final operations for the liberation of Yugoslavia and on 9 May 1945, it entered Zagreb.

It was considered one of the most combative divisions among Yugoslav Partisans and for the successes achieved in the battles, by the decision of the Supreme Headquarters, on 19 March 1944. It was declared proletarian and named after the scientist Nikola Tesla, who was a native of Lika. All three brigades, which were part of the division when it was formed, were also declared proletarian and awarded the Order of the People's Hero.

== Formation of the division ==
Development of the Partisan resistance in Yugoslavia during 1942 was such that it became impossible to manage brigades, battalions, and partisan detachments in a previous way, so in the autumn of the same year, the Yugoslav Partisan Army was formed. In the army, the first divisions and corps were formed, which were easily mobile, maneuverable units suitable for combat operations in all parts of Yugoslavia. They were organizationally, as well as politically and morally prepared. First divisions formed, by order of the Supreme Headquarters on 1 November 1942 were the First and The Second Proletarian and Third Assault Divisions, and then on 9 November, the Fourth and Fifth Krajina Divisions. By an order number 95 of Supreme HQ in the area of the Main Staff of the National Liberation Army and Partisan Detachments of Croatia, three divisions were formed - 6th Lika, 7th Banija and 8th Kordun divisions, as well as the 1st Croatian Corps which was composed of the three newly formed divisions.

With the order on the formation of the 6th Lika Division, the 1st, 2nd, and 9th Brigade of the National Liberation Army of Croatia became part of it, which were then renamed to 1st Lika Brigade, 2nd Lika Brigade, and 3rd Lika Brigade. At the time of the formation of the 6th Division, all three brigades that were part of it were located outside Lika - the 1st Lika Brigade in the Veljun region, the 2nd Lika Brigade between Cetingrad and Velika Kladuša, and the 3rd Lika Brigade was located in the region of Bosansko Grahovo, where it was under the direct command of the Supreme Headquarters.

Srećko Manola, former commander of the First Operational Zone of Croatia and lieutenant in the Spanish Republican Army, was appointed for the division commander, and Rade Žigić, former political commissar of the Headquarters of the Group of Partisan Detachments for Lika, was appointed for political commissar. Other positions in the headquarters of the division were filled in December, when Milan Šakić Mićun, the former commander of the 2nd Lika Brigade, was appointed for the Chief of the Division Headquarters; Ilija Bato Orlić was appointed for the intelligence officer of the division; Milan Bobić, former deputy commander of the 1st Brigade, was appointed for the operative officer. The headquarters of the 6th Division was subordinated to the Headquarters of the 1st Croatian Corps, headed by Commander Ivan Gošnjak.

Number of soldiers and weapons in 6th Division upon its formation
Brigade	1st Lika	2nd Lika	3rd Lika	Total
Soldiers	1,082	1,071	1,201	3,354
Rifles	827	969	936	2,732
Machine guns	7	12	6	25
Light machine guns	43	56	20	119
Mortars	2	5	3	10

== Operations ==
=== First operations (November 1942 - January 1943) ===
After the establishment, the units of the 6th Lika Division took part in the joint actions of the 1st Bosnian and the 1st Croatian Corps in the valleys of the Sana and Una rivers at the end of November 1942. The 1st and 2nd Lika Brigades, in cooperation with two brigades of the 7th Banija Division, took part in the attack on the Croatian Home Guard garrison in Dvor na Uni from November 26 to 29, but they failed because of an intervention of stronger enemy forces from Kostajnica. During that time, the 3rd Lika Brigade took part in the battles near Bosansko Grahovo and Golubić. After this, the units of the 6th Lika Division concentrated in Lika in December 1942 where they carried out attacks on Italian, Ustaše, Home Guard and Chetnik forces until mid-January 1943.

=== Operation Weiss (January - March 1943) ===
During the first phase of Operation Weiss, units of the 6th Lika Division and the Lika Partisan Detachment fought hard in the heavy snow and severe cold and slowed the advance of Italian divisions - the 12th Infantry Division Sassari and the 13th Infantry Division Re, which tried to penetrate the liberated territory of Lika and further towards Bosanski Petrovac with Ustaše and Chetnik forces. The 6th Lika Division in cooperation with the units of 8th Kordun Division managed to carry out a successful counterattack against Italian Division Sassari near Gornji Lapac between 18 and 21 February 1943. In these battles, 470 enemy soldiers were killed or injured and a large amount of military equipment was seized. The 6th Division continued a counter-offensive in a wide area from Knin to Otočac, they captured parts of Northern Dalmatia and all of Lika except for Gospić. They also destroyed the railway in Lika. During this counter-offensive, more than 1,200 enemy soldiers were imprisoned and artillery pieces, mortars, machine guns and rifles were seized. During the night between 2 and 3 March 1943, the 6th Division together with two brigades of 8th Division attacked 5,000 men-strong Ustaše garrison in Gospić but they failed to capture it.

=== Operations in Lika and Dalmatia (May - October 1943) ===
At the end of May 1943, the 2nd Lika Brigade was sent to Knin, where it fought against Italian, Chetnik and Ustaše forces until the beginning of September 1943, capturing several places, including Kijevo on July 26 and Vrlika on August 5. During that time, the 1st and 3rd Lika Brigades fought in the area of Ličko Polje and Gacko Polje. In July 1943, by the order of the Main Staff of the National Liberation Army and the Partisan Detachments of Croatia, the Blue Adriatic partisan company was placed under the command of the HQ of 6th Division, operating in the area between Obrovac and Karlobag. In September 1943, it grew into a detachment, which continued its independent activities on the between Obrovac and Zadar. During September and October 1943, units of the 6th Lika Division attacked parts of the German 114th Jäger and 373rd Legionary Divisions at the Donji Lapac-Gračac road and it fought in the Gospić area.

After the capitulation of Italy, in September 1943, over 200 fighters-leaders were sent from the division to northern Dalmatia and Istria, where they represented the leading staff for the newly formed units. At the same time, the division's units were filled with about 1,000 new fighters from the Croatian coast. By the order of the Main Staff of the National Liberation Army and the Croatian Armed Forces, on October 24, 1943, the Headquarters of the 6th Lika Division formed a Lika Partisan Detachment of 150 fighters.

=== Operations in Bosnia (October 1943 - June 1944) ===
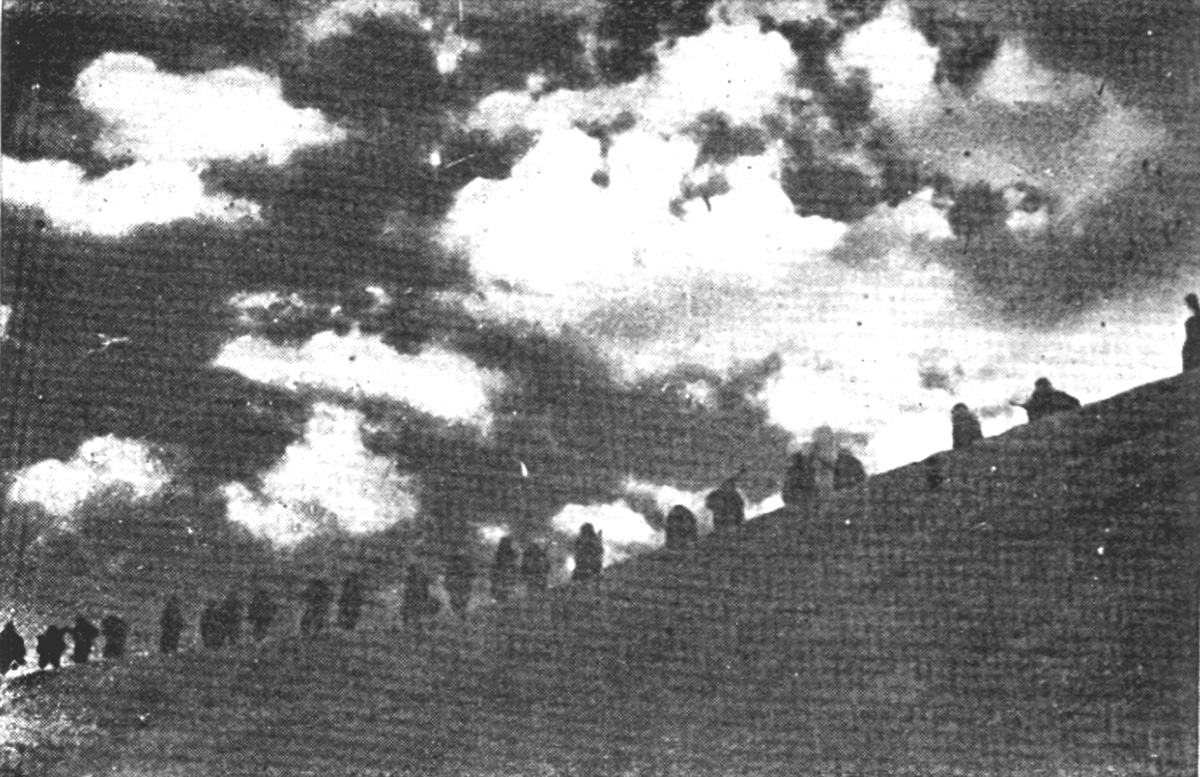
6th Lika Division moving over the Kupreško polje (December 1943)

On 11 November 1943, the 6th Lika Division left the Serb region and reached Bugojno via Drvar and Kupres, where it became part of the 1st Proletarian Corps, while the Lika Partisan Detachment remained active in Lika. Together with the units of the 1st Proletarian Division, the units of the 6th Lika Division took part in the battles near Travnik and Zenica in the second half of November and early December 1943, thus securing the liberated Jajce where the Second session of AVNOJ was held.

Between December 1943 and January 1944 brigades of the division carried out several independent operations. On the night of 16/17 December, the 2nd Lika Brigade successfully attacked German garrison in Šujica, in January 1944 the brigade moved to the liberated Drvar. The 3rd Lika Brigade moved towards Banja Luka via Jajce, Mrkonjić Grad and Ključ where it took part in the First Banja Luka Operation on New Year's Eve. In the beginning of December 1943, the 1st Lika Brigade operated on the route from Travnik to Jajce and Donji Vakuf. The brigade was later sent to Mrkonjić Grad area where it fought against German 92nd Motorized Regiment, between 8 and 11 January 1944. From 13 to 20 January 1944, units of the 6th Lika Division fought fierce battles near Pecka, Medna, Gerzovo, Mlinište and Jasenovi Potoci against strong German motorized forces that penetrated from Banja Luka and Mrkonjić Grad towards Glamoč.

The Supreme Commander of the Yugoslav Partisans, Josip Broz Tito, expressed his gratitude to the entire composition of the division for the heroism shown in these battles. At the beginning of February, the 1st Lika Brigade moved to the Drvar area, and the 3rd Lika Brigade to Glamoč. For the successes achieved in the battles, the 6th Lika Division was declared proletarian on 19 March 1944 by the Decree of the Supreme Headquarters and was named after the scientist Nikola Tesla. This was the first time for the division to be declared proletarian in Yugoslav Partisans, previously division would become proletarian through its brigades. Simultaneously with the assignment of the proletarian title to the division, all three of its brigades became proletarian as well.

At beginning of April 1944, units of the 6th Division gathered in Drvar area to prevent enemy attack and to protect the Supreme Headquarters staff. At that time, about 150 Soviet prisoners who had previously escaped from German units joined the division. Russian Battalion was formed from the Soviets as a part of the 1st Lika Brigade. On 17 May 1944, Russian Battalion was dissolved because of its fighting weaknesses and the soldiers form the battalion were transferred to other units of the 1st and 3rd Lika Brigades.

==== Operation Rösselsprung (May - June 1944) ====
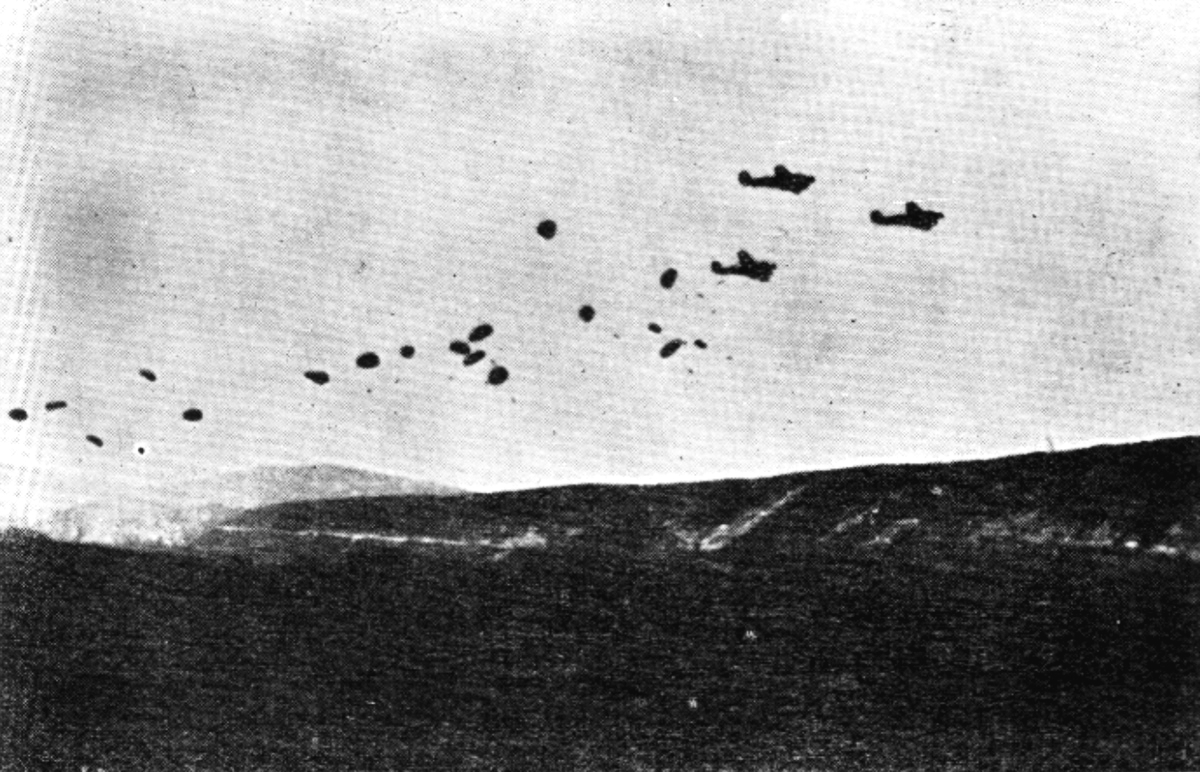
German parachute assault on Drvar

During the German combined parachute and glider-borne assault, on May 25, 1944, the 3rd Lika Brigade moved from their position near Trubar and Resanovci to Drvar, where together with the Tito Escort Battalion, the 1st Battalion of the 1st Lika Brigade and the 1st Battalion of the 1st Dalmatian Brigade fought very fiercely against the German paratroopers and prevented them from liquidating the Supreme Headquarters staff. For the successes achieved in this battle, the 3rd Lika Brigade was awarded the Order of the People's Hero on May 25, 1974, during the celebration of the thirtieth anniversary of the victory in Operation Rösselsprung.

Other parts of the 6th Division fought the German forces which were advancing in the direction of Srb-Trubar-Drvar. After June 11, 1944, units of the 6th Lika Division were transferred from the area of Drvar to the area of Glamoč, from where they attacked German forces in Livno and along the Kupres-Livno road. At the time around 200 men and 100 women, who had returned from concentration camps, joined the division as soldiers and nurses.

=== Operations in Serbia (July - October 1944) ===
From the Glamoč region, on 20 July 1944, units of the 6th Lika Division undertook a movement through Bosnia, Montenegro and Sandžak to western Serbia, where they arrived at the end of August. During this march, the 2nd and 3rd Lika Brigades were awarded Order of National Liberation. During the extremely difficult marches, the division's units fought fierce battles against German and Quisling forces, especially near Vranduk, on the Sarajevo-Višegrad road and railway, near Orahovci and Kalinovik and on Sutjeska and Piva rivers. The division, together with the forces of the 3rd Assault Division protected the air transport of the wounded soldiers to Bari from an improvised airport near the village of Gornja Brezna. In Operation Rübezahl, in August 1944, the 6th Lika and 1st Proletarian Divisions successfully fought against the 2nd Panzer Army and managed to penetrate into Serbia.

On the night of 29/30 August 1944, the units of the 6th Lika Division moved across the Lim river near the village of Banja, and crossed into Serbia. They grouped up with the 1st Proletarian Division on Zlatibor and they fought successfully against strong Chetnik forces around Požega, on Jelova gora, and near the village of Mionica when the Chetnik Fourth Group of Assault Corps and parts of the Serbian Volunteer Corps was defeated. On 7 September 1944, the 6th Lika Division was praised by the Supreme Commander of Yugoslav Partisans for its heroism and endurance in the battles from Drvar to Serbia, in which it lost 1/4 of its fighters. After heavy fighting, together with units of the 1st Proletarian Division, it participated in the liberation of Valjevo on 18 September 1944, and then penetrating through Tamnava and Mačva, liberated Vladimirci on October 4 and reached Sava, where it captured Debrc and cut the Obrenovac-Šabac communication line. The division was then filled with new fighters from the wider area of Valjevo, and on 8 October 1944, the 22nd Serbian Kosmaj Brigade became part of it. During October 1944, the division took part in Belgrade Offensive, during which it waged particularly difficult battles for the ministry buildings in Nemanjina Street and Kneza Miloša Street, when it suffered losses of about 200 killed and 250 wounded fighters.

After the liberation of Belgrade on 20 October 1944, the majority of the 6th Lika Division reinforced by the 13th Proletarian Brigade, crossed the bridge over the Sava and together with the Red Army fought against German forces at the airport and in Bežanijska kosa. After Zemun and Bežanija were liberated on October 22, the division continued to advance through Syrmia. For the successes achieved in the Belgrade offensive, together with other units that participated in the offensive, the 6th Lika Division was praised by the Supreme Commander of Yugoslav Partisans.

=== Syrmian Front and Final Operations (October 1944 - June 1945) ===
Advancing through Syrmia, units of the 6th Lika Division took part in the liberation of several villages. In early November 1944, the division suffered heavy losses and at the end of the same month was withdrawn to Belgrade in order to replenish, rest, train and reorganize units. At that time, rearmament was carried out with weapons obtained from the Soviet Union. In December 1944, an Artillery Brigade was formed within the division, with a strength of three divizions. Also, in addition to this brigade, the 6th Lika Division had two independent divisions. In early December, Battalion "Jane Sandanski" joined the division which was included in the 1st Lika Brigade, as its 5th Battalion. After its brigades were filled with a large number of new fighters from Serbia, the 6th Lika Division grew to about 16,000 people.

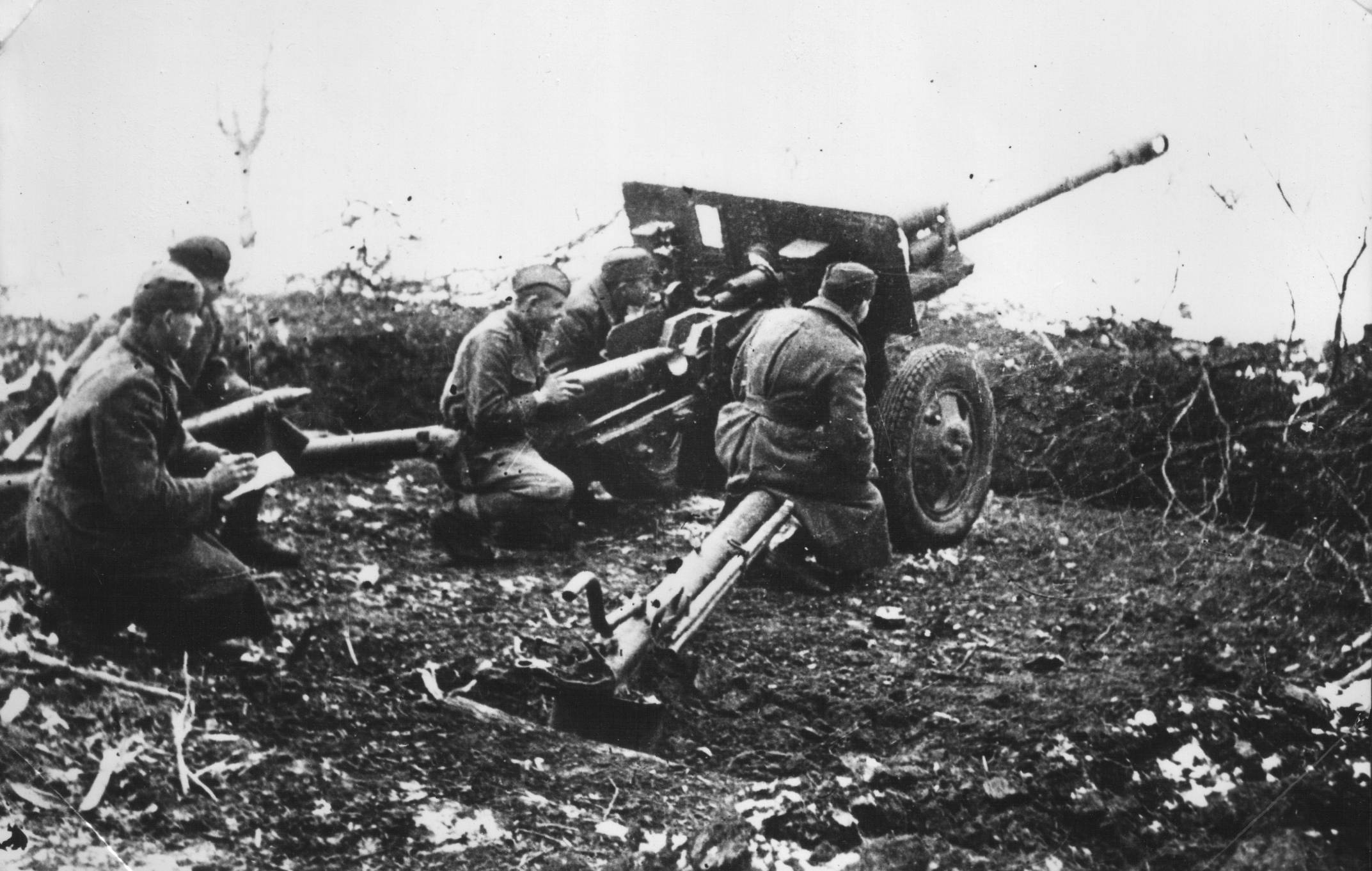
Artillery of the 6th Division on Syrmian Front (March 1945)

In addition to the four infantry and one artillery brigade, the 6th Lika Division had an anti-tank divizion, a liaison battalion, an engineering battalion, a medical battalion, and rear units and institutions. Filled and rested, at the beginning of January 1945, the division was transferred to the Syrmian Front in the region of Šid-Adaševci, where it performed defensive and offensive actions in difficult conditions. At the beginning of March 1945, the division was reorganized, during which the 22nd Serbian Kosmaj Brigade and the Jane Sandanski Battalion and all the fourth battalions in the brigades were disbanded, and their personnel was deployed to the remaining units.

During the breakthrough of the Syrmian Front, in April 1945, the units of the 6th Lika Division fought for Batrovci, Lipovac, Soljani, Vrbanja, Piškorevci and Novi Perkovci. Together with the units of the 21st Serbia Division, the 6th Lika Division liberated Đakovo on September 16, and on April 20, in cooperation with the 5th Krajina Division and the 17th East Bosnia Division, Slavonski Brod. After the fighting on the Ilova river, from 25 April to 3 May, the division in cooperation with the 1st Proletarian Division liberated Čazma on 5 May, and on 9 May it entered Zagreb. After that, until May 15, 1945, it cleared Zagrebačka gora from the remaining enemy forces. After the capitulation of the last occupying-quisling forces and the end of the World War II in Yugoslavia, the 6th Lika Division was withdrawn to Zagreb, where a solemn inspection of the division and its remaining 8,055 fighters (Note: Out of a total of 16.605 fighters that the division had in January 1945 when it set out for the Syrmian Front about 2,000 fighters were transferred to the 21st Division and 1,563 to other units; 1,062 fighters were killed; 3,665 wounded, 31 died and 131 disappeared) was held on May 16 in Maksimir. After the ceremonial inspection, which was carried out by the division commander, Major general Đoko Jovanić, and the political commissar, Lieutenant colonel Nikola Peinović, the division remained in Zagreb until May 20, when it left for Lika. As some units of the division performed certain tasks on their way to Lika, the complete division was in Lika only in June 1945.

== Command composition of the division ==
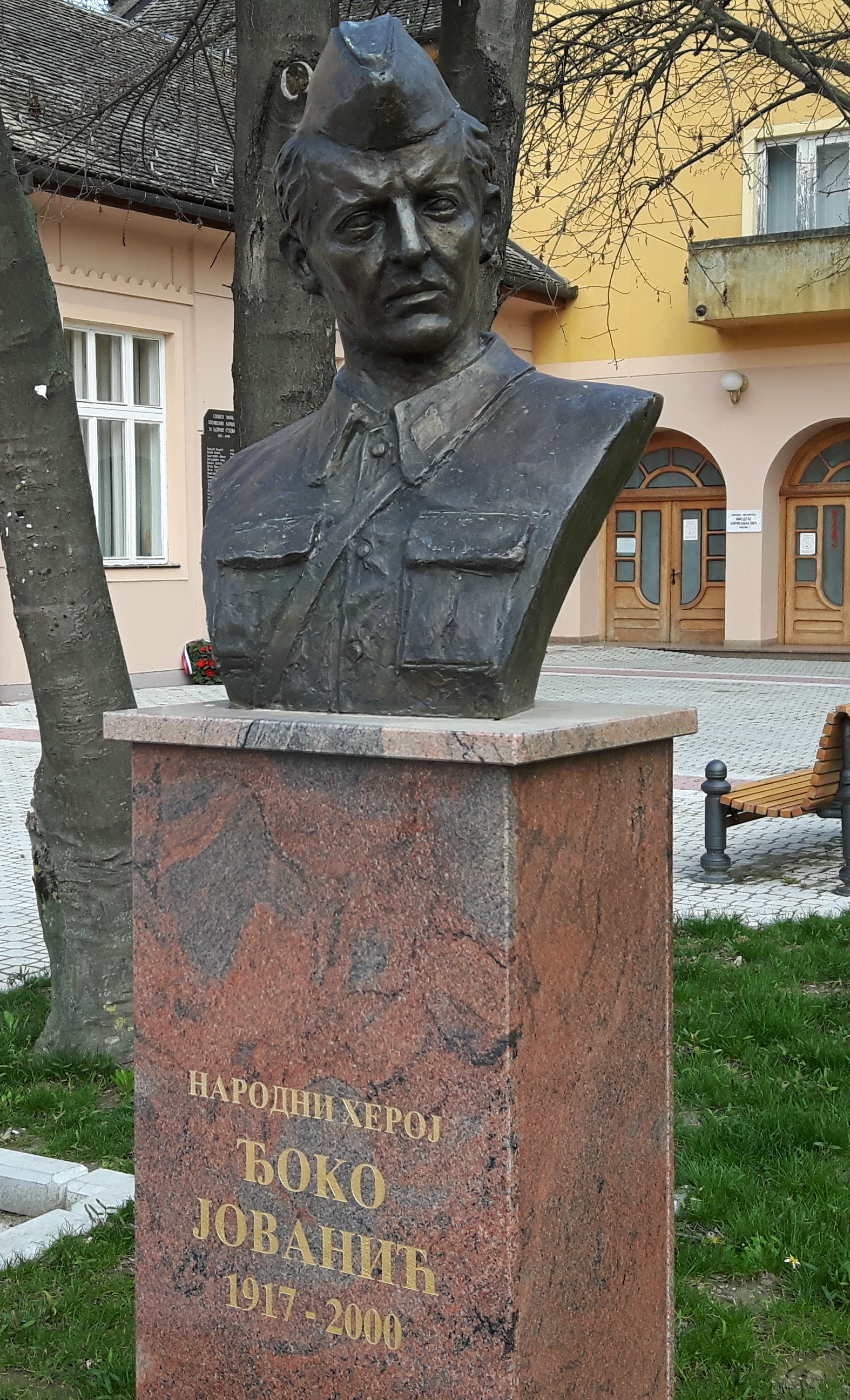
Bust of Djoka Jovanić in Apatin

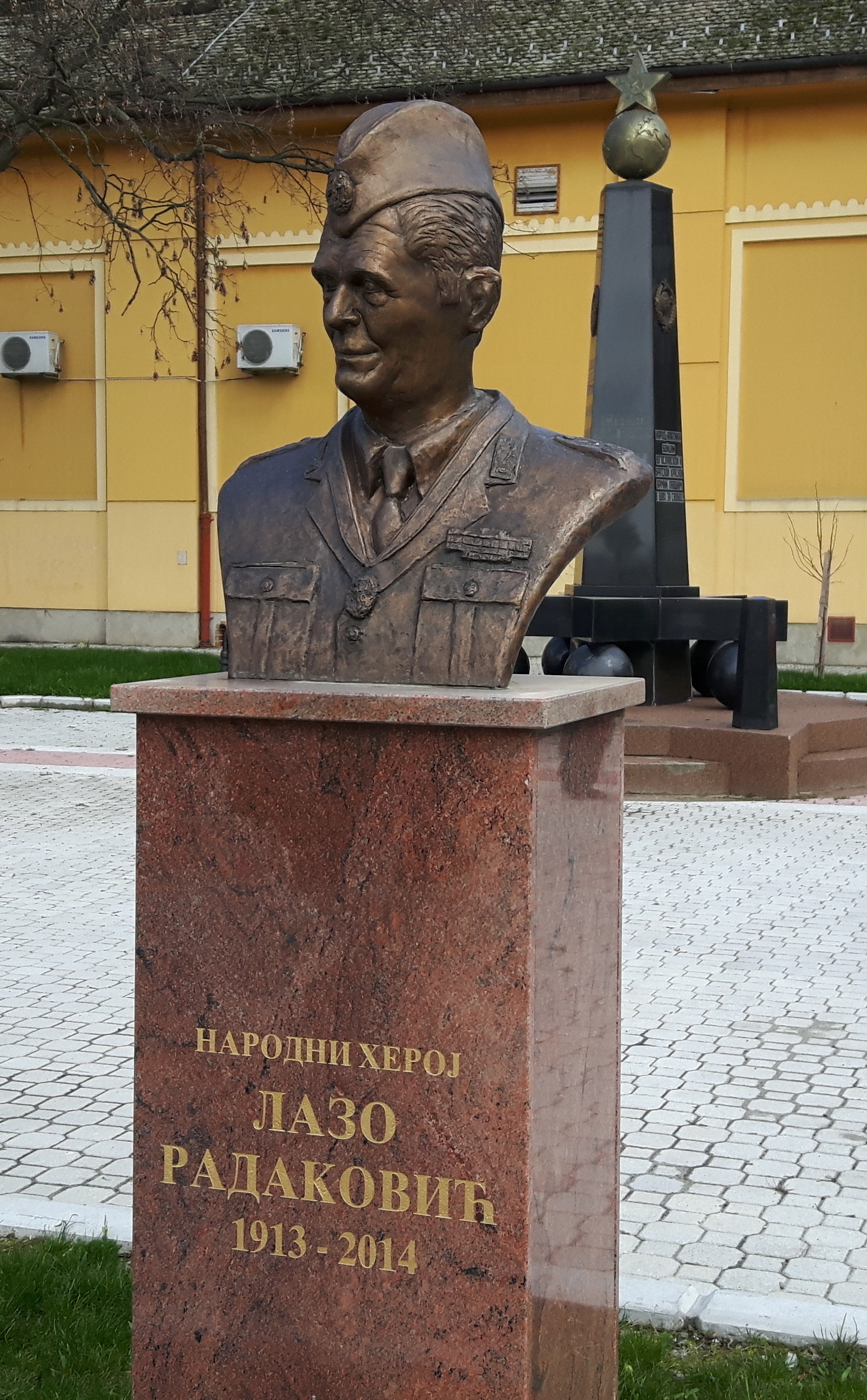
Bust of Laza Radaković in Apatin

Position	Name	Took office	Left office
Commander	Srećko Manola	November 1942	March 1943
Commander	Đoko Jovanić	March 1943	May 1945
Political commissar	Rade Žigić	November 1942	September 1943
Political commissar	Živan Dimitrijević	September 1943	December 1943
Political commissar	Dragoslav Mutapović	December 1943	October 1944
Political commissar	Nikola Peinović	October 1944	May 1945
Chief of the Division Staff	Milan Šakić Mićun	December 1942	June 1943
Chief of the Division Staff	Mile Uzelac	June 1943	February 1944
Chief of the Division Staff	Božo Božović	February 1944	March 1944
Chief of the Division Staff	Dušan Dotlić	March 1944	December 1944
Chief of the Division Staff	Lako Radaković	December 1944	May 1945

== Strength and national composition of the division ==
The strength of the 6th Lika Division between its formation in November 1942 and October 1944 (Note: In October 1944, the 22nd Serbian Kosmaj Brigade joined the division and it was filled with new fighters) ranged from around 3,000 to around 4,500 soldiers. According to the report of the Division Headquarters made on 19 December 1942, a month after the formation and ten days after the return of the division units to Lika, the division had a total of 4,230 fighters, of whom 660 were out of the division (sick or wounded). According to a report made a few days later, on 24 December the division had 3,844 fighters. This report also gives the national, social, and party composition of the division. According to the national structure, the majority of fighters in the division were Serbs, and besides them, there were 159 Croats and five members of other nationalities in the division: 2 Slovenes, 1 Jew, 1 Muslim and 1 Russian. Most Croats, 118 of them, were in the 1st Lika Brigade, while the 2nd and 3rd Lika Brigades were almost completely filled with Serb fighters. Regarding the social structure, the largest number of fighters, 3,288 of them were peasants, 8.6% workers and craftsmen, and the rest were of various other occupations. Among the members of the division there were 120 professional military personnel, mostly non-commissioned officers of the former Yugoslav Army. Considering that the largest number of fighters came from poor rural areas, as much as 7% of fighters were illiterate. Although partisans are often considered the ideological army of the Communist Party, only 367 fighters were members of the SKJ. Intensive political work covered 1,171 fighters or 30.4%, and they were registered as candidates for members of the SKJ, while the largest part of the brigade's fighters, 60% of them, were not covered by party work.

According to the report of the Headquarters of the 4th Corps from 16 January 1943, the 6th Lika Division numbered around 4,200 fighters. Shortly after this report, the first phase of the Fourth Enemy Offensive began, during which the division's units fought hard battles, so according to the report of the Division Headquarters dated 6 February 1943, the number was 4,467 fighters, of whom 1,178 were out of the combat (wounded), and 3,277 in combat. After the end of the offensive, the condition of the division, according to the report of the Headquarters of the division from March 31, 1943, amounted to 4,400 fighters, of which 2,917, or 66.3%, were in the division, while 1,486 of them were out. According to this report, Serbs still made up the vast majority of fighters, and the number of women in the division doubled compared to December 1942. At the end of June 1943, the division numbered 3,268 fighters, while the number of absentees (wounded) was unknown. The vast majority of fighters, 95.5% of them, were Serbs, while Croats made up only 5.6% of the division. In an effort to include a larger number of Croats people in the unit, the Division Headquarters issued an order on 14 July to form the 1st Lika Croatian Battalion "Matija Gubec", to whom almost all Croat fighters from the units of the 6th Lika Division were reassigned. The battalion was formed on the initiatives of the Central Committee of the Communist Party of Croatia and the Main Staff of the National Liberation Army and the Partisan Detachments of Croatia with the aim for the battalion to later grow into a brigade. For a long time after its formation, the battalion was not involved in combat, but was sent on easier tasks and oriented towards political action in Croatian villages, in order to mobilize the civilians. In August 1943, it grew to about 260 fighters, and that is where its development stopped. As it did not meet the expectations in order to mobilize the Croatian population, it was disbanded on 15 October 1943.

On 25 August 1943, the Division amounted to a total of 4,432 fighters, of which 3,284 were in combat. According to this detailed report, the majority of fighters, 91%, were Serbs, while the number of Croats rose to 8.9%. Regarding the social structure, the largest number of fighters, 81% of them were peasants, while party work included exactly half of the fighters of the division, 19.8% of them were members of the SKJ, 23% were members of SKOJ, and 6.7% were candidates for members of SKJ. Two months later, before joining the 1st Proletarian Corps, when it began its campaign from Lika through Bosnia, Herzegovina, Montenegro, and Sandžak to Šumadija, the division had 4,971 fighters, of which 3,871 were in combat. The largest number of fighters, 80% of them were Serbs, the number of Croats grew to 18%, while the rest were members of other nationalities, including 70 Italians.

During the campaign from Lika to Serbia, the division's units were filled with new fighters, but as a large number of fighters were killed, the division didn't grow in numbers. At the end of January 1944, there were 3,336 fighters in the combat, while in mid-February there were 3,518 fighters. In May 1944, just before the Operation Rösselsprung, the division had 3,667 fighters, and after heavy fighting with German paratroopers on May 25 and 26, the number of fighters decreased for 156 - 49 were killed, 73 wounded. and 34 missing. In the fighting during the Drvar operation, as well as in the fighting during the forty-day march from Glamoč to Priboj the 6th Lika Division lost more than 1/3 of its soldiers, so in September 1944 it arrived on Zlatibor with only about 2,400 fighters. After arriving in Serbia, in the period from the liberation of Valjevo to the beginning of the Belgrade operation, there was an influx of a large number of new fighters into the division so the division on 9 October 1944 had over 5,600 fighters. At the end of November 1944, before the division withdrew from the Syrmian Front, it had a total of 5,992 fighters including many fighters who had recently arrived. Along with the recruitment of new fighters, hundreds of old fighters and officers were withdrawn from the division, who were sent as command staff to newly formed units and institutions. According to some data, from mid-September 1944 to the beginning of February 1945, a total of 520 old fighters were reassigned.

As it suffered heavy losses in the fighting on the Syrmian front, which amounted to 147 dead, 539 wounded and 34 missing fighters in the period from 29 October to 9 November alone, the division was withdrawn on 26 November. During the division's stay in Belgrade, it was reinforced with the newly mobilized conscripts from the liberated areas of Serbia, so that the strength of the division increased to 16,605 fighters at the end of December. The strength of a brigade within the division at that time was between three thousand and three and a half thousand fighters, which was close to the size of the entire division before coming to Serbia. Filled with new fighters, the division did not change its former national and social composition, because the vast majority of fighters were still Serbs and peasants. In the period from the return to the front, in early January, to the breakthrough of the front, in early April 1945, the division had about 2,000 fighters out of combat, so in mid-April, its strength decreased to around 12,000 fighters. Only in the battles for the breakthrough of the Syrmian Front, from April 4 to 13, the division had losses of 319 dead and 1,025 wounded fighters. In all battles of the 6th Lika Division on the Syrmian Front, from the end of October to the end of November 1944 and from the beginning of January to the beginning of April 1945, 1,657 fighters of the division were killed.

In the battles of the division from 4 January, when it was returned to the front until 15 May 1945, when the war in Yugoslavia ended, 1,090 of its fighters were killed, 3,772 wounded and 150 were missing, while inflicting losses on enemy units of the 7,054 killed, 5,437 wounded and 2,039 captured soldiers. A total of 8,055 fighters, half of the fighters who went to the front in January, attended the inspection of the division's units, which took place in Zagreb on 16 May 1945. In addition to casualties, the number of fighters in the division was also affected by the transfer of over 3,500 fighters from the division. During the transformation of the Yugoslav Partisan Army into the Yugoslav Army, in March 1945, following the example of the Soviet Red Army triple formation was established, and on 7 March, the 22nd Serbian Kosmaj Brigade, which was the fourth brigade in the division, was disbanded. Some of its fighters were then deployed to the remaining units, while about 2,000 of them were assigned to the 21st Serbia Division. Also, in the period from March to mid-May 1945, by an order of the Staff of the 1st Army, a total of 1,563 fighters were transferred from the division to other units.

=== Tabular display ===
National, party, and social composition of the 6th Lika Division on 24 December 1942

Unit	National composition			Party composition			Social composition					Illiterate	Total number of fighters
Unit	Serbs	Croats	Others	Party members	Party candidates	Not in Party	Peasants	Workers	Military personnel	Secondary education	Higher education	Illiterate	Total number of fighters
Division Staff	11	2	1	10	4	0	0	3	5	1	5	0	14
Agitprop of the division	19	2	2	6	6	11	6	2	1	3	11	0	23
Escort battalion	58	5	0	0	14	49	54	4	3	0	2	0	63
1st Lika Brigade	885	118	1	108	370	526	795	136	40	12	21	98	1,004
2nd Lika Brigade	1,562	28	1	141	449	1,001	1,393	137	40	6	15	100	1,519
3rd Lika Brigade	1,145	4	0	102	328	719	1,040	50	31	18	10	66	1,149
Total	3,680	159	5	367	1,171	2,306	3,288	332	120	40	64	269	3,844
Percentage	95,7%	4,1%	0,1%	9,5%	30,4%	59,9%	85,5%	8,6%	3,1%	1%	1,6%	7%	—

National, party, and social composition of the 6th Lika Division on 31 March 1943

Unit	Gender composition		National composition			Party composition			Social composition				Strength		
Unit	Men	Women	Serbs	Croats	Others	Party members	Party candidates	Not in Party	Peasants	Workers	Military personnel	Other	In combat	Out of combat	Total
Division Staff	11	0	11	0	0	10	0	1	1	0	0	4	11	0	11
Escort battalion	72	8	76	4	0	1	7	74	67	13	0	0	65	15	80
Engineering battalion	46	0	44	2	0	0	0	46	36	9	1	0	36	10	46
1st Lika Brigade	1,208	115	800	75	1	169	70	637	710	114	33	19	876	447	1,323
2nd Lika Brigade	1,370	125	926	17	0	180	62	701	831	68	26	18	943	552	1,495
3rd Lika Brigade	1,385	63	975	11	0	173	333	480	881	54	24	27	986	462	1,448
Total	4,092	311	2,832	109	1	533	472	1,937	2,526	258	84	68	2,917	1,486	4,403
Percentage	92,9%	7,1%	96,3%	3,7%	0,03%	18,1%	16%	65,9%	85,8%	8,7%	2,8%	2,3%	66,3%	33,7%	—

National, party, and social composition of the 6th Lika Division on 25 August 1943

Unit	Gender composition		National composition			Party composition				Social composition				Strength		
Unit	Men	Women	Serbs	Croats	Others	Party members	Party candidates	SKOJ Members	Not in the Party	Peasants	Workers	Military personnel	Other	In combat	Out of combat	Total
Division Staff (Note: Including Support Staff)	121	12	118	14	1	33	7	38	55	75	24	8	26	133	0	113
Escort battalion	73	6	70	5	0	6	27	6	36	68	7	0	0	75	4	79
Engineering battalion	37	2	38	0	0	1	1	13	23	31	4	0	3	38	1	39
1st Lika Brigade	1,066	89	882	6	3	202	57	188	444	765	74	28	24	891	264	1,155
2nd Lika Brigade	1,297	96	832	17	0	164	50	136	485	761	40	21	13	835	558	1,393
3rd Lika Brigade	1,264	71	1,049	1	0	210	75	317	448	965	42	17	26	986	285	1,335
Battalion "Matija Gubec"	264	34	0	262	0	35	6	61	160	213	37	3	9			
Total	4,122	310	2,989	291	4	651	223	759	1,651	2,665	191	74	92	3,284	1,148	4,432
Percentage	93%	7%	91%	8.9%	0.1%	19.8%	6.7%	23.1%	50.2%	81.1%	5.8%	2.2%	2.8%	74%	26%	—

National, party, and social composition of the 6th Lika Division on 30 October 1943

Unit	Gender composition		National composition			Party composition				socijalni sastav				Strength		
Unit	Men	Women	Serbs	Croats	Others	Party members	Party candidates	SKOJ Members	Not in the party	Peasants	Workers	Military personnel	Other	In combat	Out of combat	Total
Staff Division	12	0	10	1	1	8	0	0	4	1	1	4	6	12	0	12
Support staff of the Division HQ	168	24	114	42	2	38	49	10	61	126	18	4	10	158	34	192
liaison battalion	143	5	69	71	2	5	28	7	102	139	0	3	0	142	142	148
Engineering battalion	45	2	38	5	0	5	16	1	21	33	7	0	3	43	4	47
1st Lika Brigade	1.247	105	850	225	17	210	191	37	654	827	207	30	28	1,092	260	1.352
2nd Lika Brigade	1.282	112	905	140	5	198	364	45	443	894	98	21	37	1,050	344	1.394
3rd Lika Brigade	1.419	324	891	170	55	202	238	57	619	962	106	18	30	1,116	378	1.494
1st Mountain Battery	55	1	46	9	1	7	10	5	34	40	10	2	4	56	0	56
Total	4.371	324	2.923	663	83	674	896	162	1.937	3.022	447	82	118	1.026	3.669	4.695
Percentage	93.1%	6.9%	79.7%	18%	2.3%	18.3%	24.4%	4.4%	52.8%	82.3%	12.1%	2.2%	3.2%	21.9%	78.1%	—

== Legacy ==
The 6th Lika Division was considered one of the most combative divisions of Yugoslav Partisans. On 19 March 1944, it was declared to be a proletarian division via decree of Supreme Headquarters, it was also named after scientist Nikola Tesla who was from Lika.

Given the special persistence and striking ability in the fight against the occupiers and all enemies of the people, the Supreme Headquarters of the NOV and POJ decided to give the 6th Lika Division of the First Corps the name: 6th Proletarian Division "Nikola Tesla"

— Part of a Decree of the Supreme Headquarters of the NOV and POJ.

All three brigades, which were part of the division when it was formed, were declared proletarian and decorated with the Order of the People's Hero - the 3rd Lika Brigade was decorated on 25 May 1974, to mark the thirtieth anniversary of victory in Operation Rösselsprung, and the 1st and the 2nd Lika brigade were decorated on 21 July 1977, on the occasion of marking the thirty-fifth anniversary of the formation of the divisions.These three brigades were also awarded the Order of National Liberation, the Order of the Partisan Star with a Golden Wreath, and the Order of Brotherhood and Unity with a Golden Wreath, while the 22nd Serbian Kosmaj Brigade and the Artillery Brigade were awarded the Order of Merit for the People with a gold star.

A total of 24 members of units from the 6th Lika Division were awarded the Order of the People's Hero. A number of surviving fighters of the division continued their professional careers in the Yugoslav People's Army (JNA) after the war, where some of them performed high duties. Over 15 generals of the JNA were former members of the 6th Lika Division, and the most famous of them were Colonel generals - Djoko Jovanic (1917-2000), Deputy Secretary in the Federal Secretariat for National Defense; Milan Žeželj (1917–1995), commander of the Guards Brigade and personal companion of Marshal Tito and Ilija Radaković (1923–2015), Deputy Federal Secretary for National Defense of the SFRY.

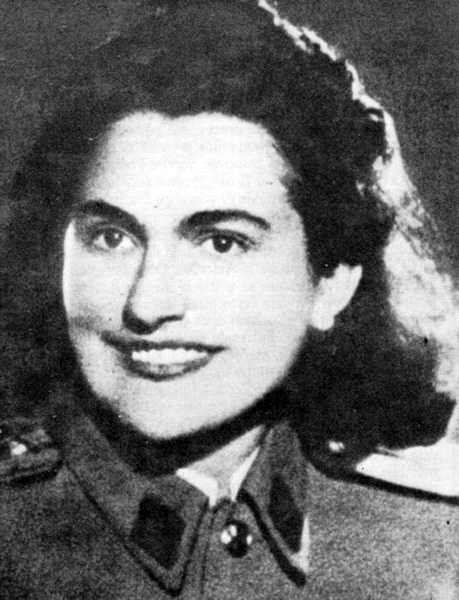
Jovanka Broz

The cult of the 6th Lika Division as one of the favorite units of Josip Broz Tito arose due to the fact that the units from its composition played a significant role during the Operation Rösselsprung in May 1944. At that time, the 3rd Lika Brigade stood out, which during the German airborne assault on May 25, 1944, forced marched from the area of Trubar to Drvar and with a strong attack drove the German paratroopers away from the cave, where the Supreme Headquarters Staff were stationed. Also, Tito's wife Jovanka Budisavljević Broz (1924—2013) was a member of the 6th Lika Division.

In 1981, in the settlement of Mukinje on Plitvice Lakes, a Memorial House of Fighters and Youth of the Sixth Proletarian Division Nikola Tesla was erected, whose exhibition consisted of three parts - an ethnographic collection, a collection of artworks by contemporary artists and a collection of war equipment and weapons. The ethnographic collection represented the traditional life in Lika and consisted of objects for everyday use in rural households, in the field and during the performance of various other activities. The art collection consisted of about 120 paintings and sculptures, whose authors were famous Yugoslav artists, including - Djordje Andrejević-Kun, Antun Augustinčić, Petar Lubarda, Ismet Mujezinović, Ivan Sabolić, Ljubica Cuca Sokić, Marko Čelebonović, Stojan Ćelić and others. The collection of war equipment and weapons, in addition to trophy weapons used during the war, also contained facsimiles and copies of war documents, as well as personal items and documents of fighters of the 6th Lika Division. After Operation Storm, during which in August 1995 Croatian forces looted and destroyed the museum exhibit. The building of the Memorial Home was damaged then, and later it was renovated and today it is used for the needs of the Sports and Recreation Center Mukinje.

The Association of Fighters, Descendants and Admirers of the Sixth Lika Proletarian Division "Nikola Tesla" and the 35th Lika Assault Division, which is part of the organization of the Association of Veterans of the People's Liberation Wars of Serbia (SUBNOR), exists and operates in Belgrade. Association is particularly active in Apatin, where many families from Lika immigrated after World War II. In recent years, memorial busts of generals and national heroes Đoko Jovanić and Laza Radaković have been erected on the town square in Apatin.

Today, 20 streets in the territory of the Republic of Serbia bear the name of the 6th Lika Division, and some of them are located in Apatin, Belgrade, Valjevo, Vrbas, Požarevac and Sombor.

== List of People's Heroes from the 6th Division ==
Name	Year of birth	Year of death	Year of receiving of the Order of People's Hero	Position held	Footnote
Milan Antončić	1918	1997	1951	Commander of the Artillery Brigade	
Petar Babić	1919	2006	1953	Political commissar of the 2nd Lika Brigade	
Božo Božović	1911	1993	1953	Chief of the Division Staff	
Bogdan Bolta	1922	1944	1945	Commander of a platoon in the 1st Lika Brigade	
Danilo Damjanović	1915	1990	1953	Deputy commander of the 2nd Lika Brigade	
Milan Žeželj	1917	1995	1945	Commander of the 13th Proletarian Brigade	
Dmitar Zaklan	1915	1988	1953	Commander of the 1st Lika Brigade	
Ljubomir Ivković	1910	1983	1953	Deputy political commissar of the Kosmaj Brigade	
Đoko Jovanić	1917	2000	1951	Commander of the division	
Milan Kuprešanin	1911	2005	1952	Commander of the 3rd Lika Brigade	
Dane Majstorović	1914	1944	1951	Commander of a platoon in the 2nd Lika Brigade	
Srećko Manola	1914	1979	1953	Commander of the division	
Dragoslav Mutapović	1912	1990	1953	Political commissar of the division	
Momčilo Novković	1916	1988	1953	Commander of the 3rd Lika Brigade	
Stanko Opsenica	1907	1943	1945	Commander of the battalion in the 2nd Lika Brigade	
Stevan Opsenica	1913	2002	1951	Commander of the 1st Lika Brigade	
Tomica Popović	1915	1966	1953	Acting-commander of the 2nd Lika Brigade	
Ilija Radaković	1923	2015	1951	Logistics officer of the 1st Lika Brigade	
Lazo Radaković	1913	2014	1951	Chief of the Division Staff	
Dragan Rakić	1914	1959	1953	Commander of the 2nd Lika Brigade	
Nikola Sovilj Nina	1919	1944	1945	Deputy commander of a battalion in the 3rd Lika Brigade	
Mile Uzelac	1913	1987	1953	Chief of the Division Staff	
Milan Šakić Mićun	1915	1971	1953	Chief of the Division Staff	
Milan Šijan	1914	2004	1951	Commander of the 3rd Lika Brigade	
