= Belgrade offensive =

1944 Second World War battle

- Part of the Yugoslav and Eastern fronts of World War II
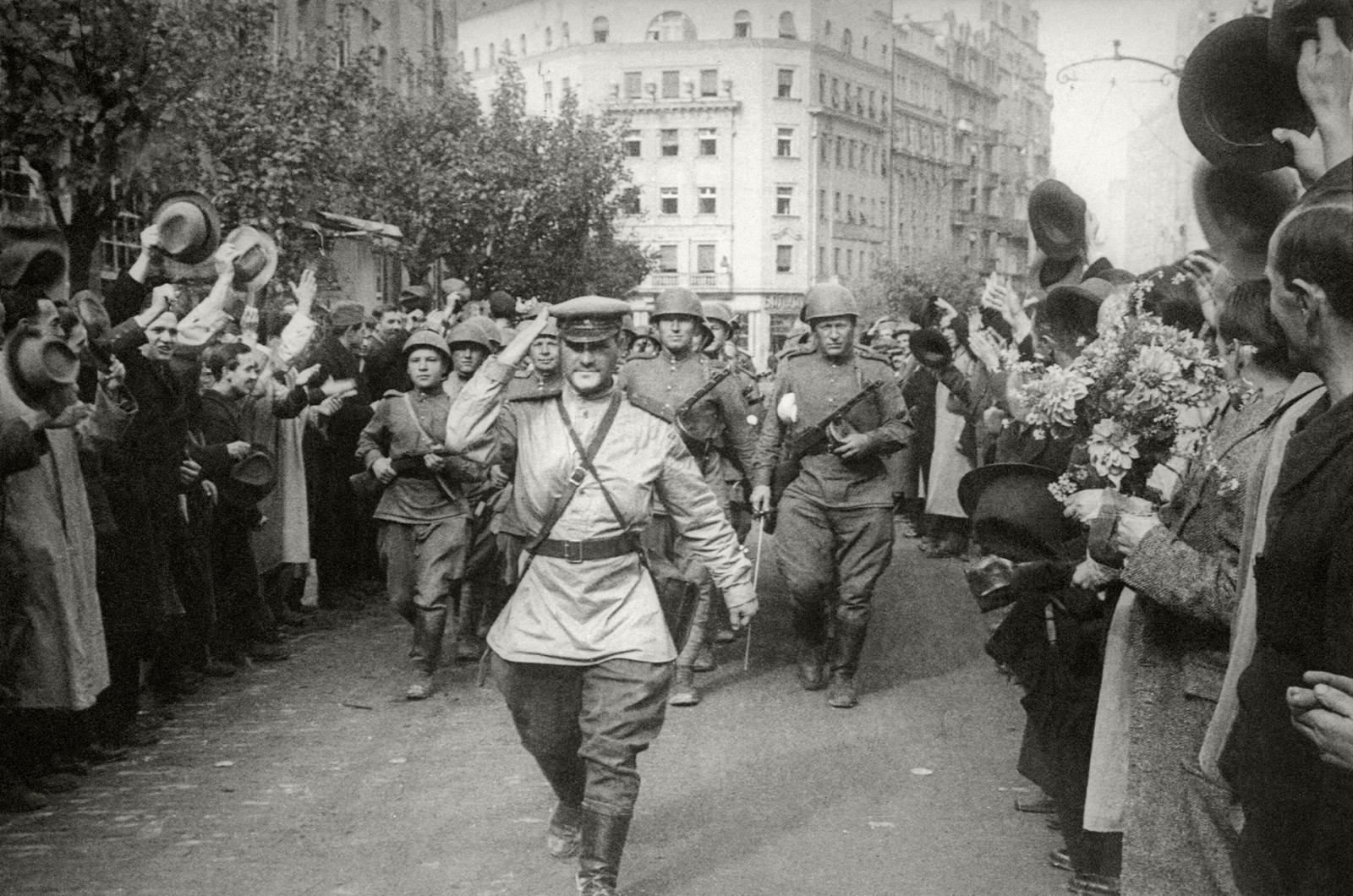
- Residents of Belgrade greet Soviet troops, 30 October 1944
Date	15 September – 24 November 1944 (2 months, 1 week and 2 days)
Location	Belgrade, Yugoslavia
Result	Allied victory: Dissolution of the Serbian collaborationist regime; Yugoslav partisan purges and murders of collaborators and anti-communist civilians in the city; Serbian collaborationist government moved to exile in Kitzbühel; Evacuation of German assets from Belgrade; Withdrawal of Serbian collaborationist forces to Slovenia and start of anti–partisan operations there

Belligerents
Allies; Soviet Union; Yugoslav Partisans; Bulgaria	Axis; Germany; Government of National Salvation; (Russia) Russian Protective Corps

Commanders and leaders
(Soviet Union) Fyodor Tolbukhin (Soviet Union) Nikolai Gagen (Soviet Union) Vladimir Zhdanov (Yugoslav Partisans) Josip Broz Tito (Yugoslav Partisans) Peko Dapčević (Yugoslav Partisans) Danilo Lekić (Yugoslav Partisans) Marko Mesić (Tsardom of Bulgaria (1908–1946)) Vladimir Stoychev (Tsardom of Bulgaria (1908–1946)) Kiril Stanchev (Tsardom of Bulgaria (1908–1946)) Asen Sirakov	(Nazi Germany) Maximilian von Weichs (Government of National Salvation) Milan Nedić; Velibor Jonić (Nazi Germany) Wilhelm Schneckenburger † (Nazi Germany) Hans Felber (Nazi Germany) Alexander Löhr

Units involved
(Soviet Union) 3rd Ukrainian Front (Yugoslav Partisans) 1st Corps (Yugoslav Partisans) 12th Corps: (Yugoslav Partisans) Yugoslav Legion; (Independent State of Croatia) 369th Croatian Infantry defectors; (Tsardom of Bulgaria (1908–1946)) 1st Army (Tsardom of Bulgaria (1908–1946)) 2nd Army (Tsardom of Bulgaria (1908–1946)) 4th Army	(Nazi Germany) Army Group F 2nd Panzer Army; Serbian State Guard (Russia) Russian Protective Corps (Government of National Salvation) Serbian Volunteer Corps

Strength
580,000 troops 3,640 artillery pieces 520 tanks and assault guns 1,420 aircraft 80 ships	150,000 troops (mostly 2nd tier infantry & non-German support troops); 2,100 artillery pieces 125 tanks and assault guns 350 aircraft 70 ships

Casualties and losses
Soviets: 4,350 killed and missing 14,488 wounded or sick 18,838 overall Bulgarian Army: Over 3,000 killed Yugoslav Partisans: 2,953 dead (assault on Belgrade only)	25,000 casualties (15,000 dead)

The Belgrade offensive or the Belgrade strategic offensive operation (Serbo-Croatian: Beogradska operacija / Београдска операција; Russian: Белградская стратегическая наступательная операция, Belgradskaya strategicheskaya nastupatel'naya operatsiya) (15 September – 24 November 1944) was a military operation during World War II in Yugoslavia in which Belgrade was liberated from the German Wehrmacht through the joint efforts of the Soviet Red Army, Yugoslav Partisans, and the Bulgarian Army. Soviet forces and local militias launched separate but loosely cooperative operations that undermined German control of Belgrade and ultimately forced a retreat. Martial planning was coordinated evenly among command leaders, and the operation was largely enabled through tactical cooperation between Josip Broz Tito and Joseph Stalin that began in September 1944. These martial provisions allowed Bulgarian forces to engage in operations throughout Yugoslav territory, which furthered tactical success while increasing diplomatic friction.

The primary objectives of the Belgrade offensive centered on lifting the German occupation of Serbia, seizing Belgrade as a strategic holdout in the Balkans, and severing German communication lines between Greece and Hungary. The spearhead of the offensive was executed by the Soviet 3rd Ukrainian Front in coordination with the Yugoslav 1st Army Corps. Simultaneous operations in the south involved the Bulgarian 2nd Army and Yugoslav XIII Army Corps, and the incursion of the 2nd Ukrainian Front northwards from the Yugoslav-Bulgarian border placed additional pressure on German command. There were additional skirmishes between Bulgarian forces and German anti-partisan regiments in Macedonia that represented the campaign's southernmost combat operations.

== Background ==
=== Developments in Yugoslavia ===
By the summer of 1944, the Germans had not only lost control of practically all the mountainous area of Yugoslavia but were no longer able to protect their own essential lines of communication. Another general offensive on their front was unthinkable, and by September it was clear that Belgrade and the whole of Serbia must shortly be free of them. These summer months were the best the movement had ever seen; there were more recruits than could be armed or trained, desertions from the enemy reached high numbers; one by one the objectives of resistance were reached and taken.

— Basil Davidson

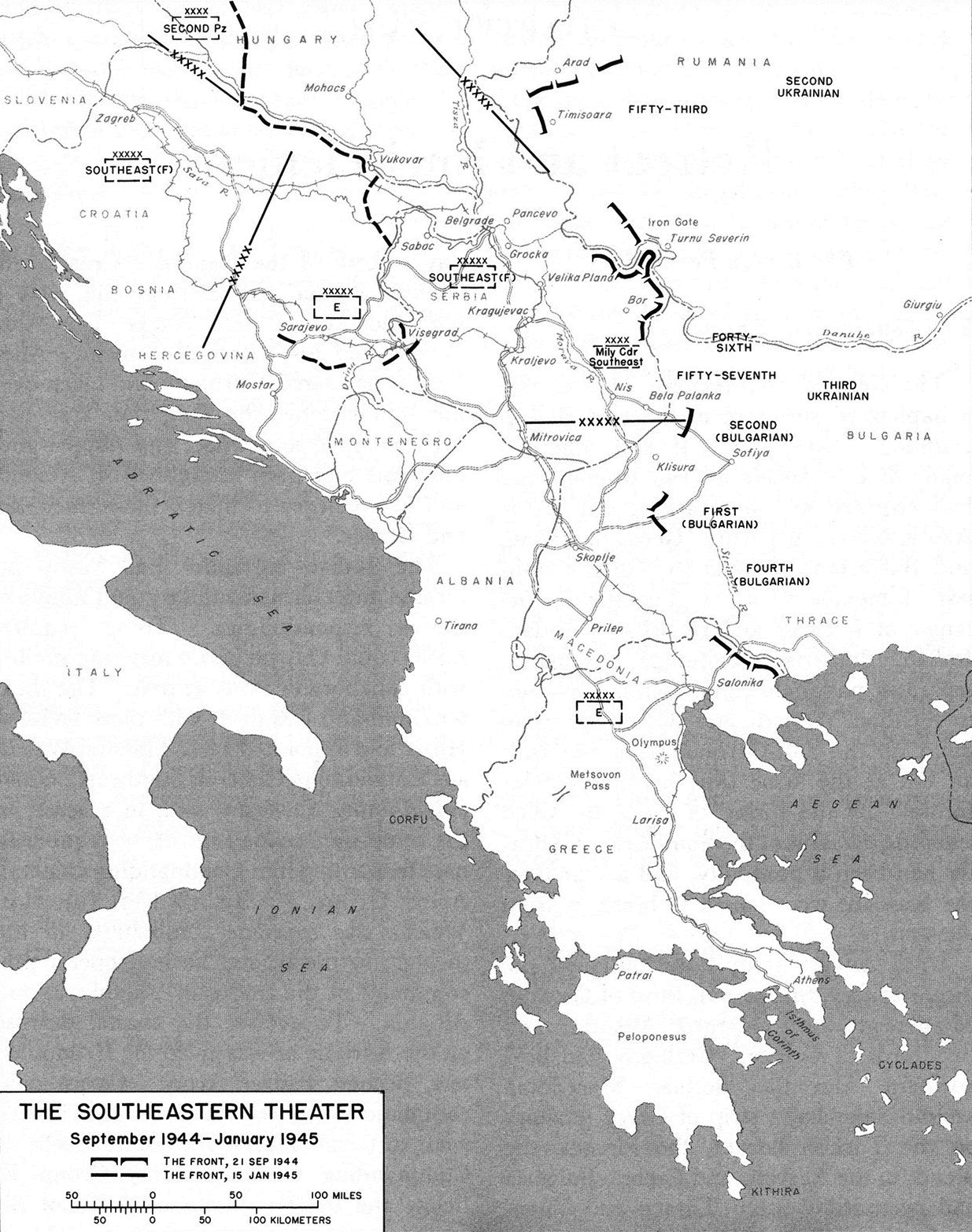
Map of the Balkan military theater during September 1944 – January 1945.

In August 1943, the German Wehrmacht had two army formations deployed in the Balkans: Army Group E in Greece and the 2nd Panzer Army in Yugoslavia and Albania. Army Group F headquarters (Generalfeldmarschall Maximilian von Weichs) in Belgrade acted as a joint high command for these formations, as well as for Bulgarian and Quisling formations.

After the collapse of the uprising in December 1941, anti-Axis activity in Serbia decreased significantly, and the focus of resistance moved to other, less populated areas. Consequently, although Serbia had great significance to the Germans, very few troops actually remained there; according to Schmider only about 10,000 in June 1944. In the following years, Tito repeatedly tried to reinforce the partisan forces in Serbia with experienced units from Bosnia and Montenegro. From the spring of 1944, the Allied command had assisted in these efforts. The Germans actively opposed these efforts by concentrating forces in the border regions of Bosnia and Montenegro, in order to disturb Partisan concentrations, to inflict casualties on Partisan units, and to push them back with a series of large-scale assaults.

In July 1944, German defenses began to fail. After the failure of Operation Draufgänger (Daredevil) – a 1944 anti-partisan operation in Montenegro, Yugoslavia, and Northern Albania – three divisions of the Narodnooslobodilačka vojska Jugoslavije (the People's Liberation Army of Yugoslavia) (NOVJ) – managed to cross the Ibar River to the east and threaten the main railroad lines. After the failure of Operation Rübezahl in Montenegro in August 1944, two additional NOVJ divisions broke through the German blockade, successfully entrenching themselves in western Serbia. Army Group F command responded by deploying additional forces: the 1st Mountain Division arrived in Serbia in early August, followed by the 4th SS Panzergrenadier Division from the Thessaloniki area.

Developments in Romania in late August 1944 confronted Army Group F command with the necessity of an immediate large-scale concentration of troops and weapons in Serbia in order to cope with a threat from the east. The Allied command, and the NOVJ supreme command, predicted this scenario and developed a plan for the occasion. On 1 September 1944, a general attack from the ground and from the air on the German transport lines and installations (Operation Ratweek) began. These attacks largely hindered German troop movements, with units disassembled and tied to the ground.

In the meantime, the 1st Proletarian Corps, the main partisan formation in Serbia, continued with reinforcing and developing its forces and with seizing positions for the assault on Belgrade. On 18 September Valjevo was taken, and on 20 September Aranđelovac. Partisans achieved control of a large area south and southwest of Belgrade, thus forming the basis for the future advance towards Belgrade.

In response to the defeat of German forces in the Second Jassy–Kishinev offensive in late August 1944, which forced Bulgaria and Romania to switch sides, and to the advance of Red Army troops into the Balkans, Berlin ordered Army Group E to withdraw into Hungary. But the combined actions of Yugoslav partisans and Allied air forces impeded German movements with Ratweek. With the Red Army on Serbia's borders, the Wehrmacht put together another provisional army formation from available elements of Army Group E and the 2nd Panzer Army for the defense of Serbia, called "Army Group Serbia" (German: Armeeabteilung Serbien).

=== Regional developments ===
As a result of the Bulgarian coup d'état of 1944, the pro-Axis regime in Bulgaria was overthrown and replaced with a government of the Fatherland Front led by Kimon Georgiev. Once the new government came to power, Bulgaria declared war on Germany. Under the new pro-Soviet government, four Bulgarian armies, 455,000 strong were mobilized and reorganized. In early October 1944, three Bulgarian armies, consisting of around 340,000 men, were located on the Yugoslav – Bulgarian border.

By the end of September, the Red Army 3rd Ukrainian Front troops under the command of Marshal Fyodor Tolbukhin were concentrated at the Bulgarian-Yugoslav border. The Soviet 57th Army was stationed in the Vidin area, while the Bulgarian 2nd Army (General Kiril Stanchev commanding under the operational command of the 3rd Ukrainian Front) was stationed to the south on the Niš rail line at the junction of the Bulgarian, Yugoslav, and Greek borders. This allowed the arrival of the Partisans 1st Army from Yugoslav territory, in order to provide support to their 13th and 14th Corps collaborating in the liberation of Niš and supporting the 57th Army's advance to Belgrade, respectively. The Red Army 2nd Ukrainian Front's 46th Army was deployed in the area of the Teregova river (Romania), poised to cut the rail link between Belgrade and Hungary to the north of Vršac.

Pre-operations were coordinated between the Soviets and the commander-in-chief of the Yugoslav Partisans, Marshal Josip Broz Tito. Tito arrived in Soviet-controlled Romania on 21 September, and from there flew to Moscow where he met with Soviet premier Joseph Stalin. The meeting was a success, in particular because the two allies reached an agreement concerning the participation of Bulgarian troops in the operation that would be conducted on Yugoslav territory.

== The offensive ==
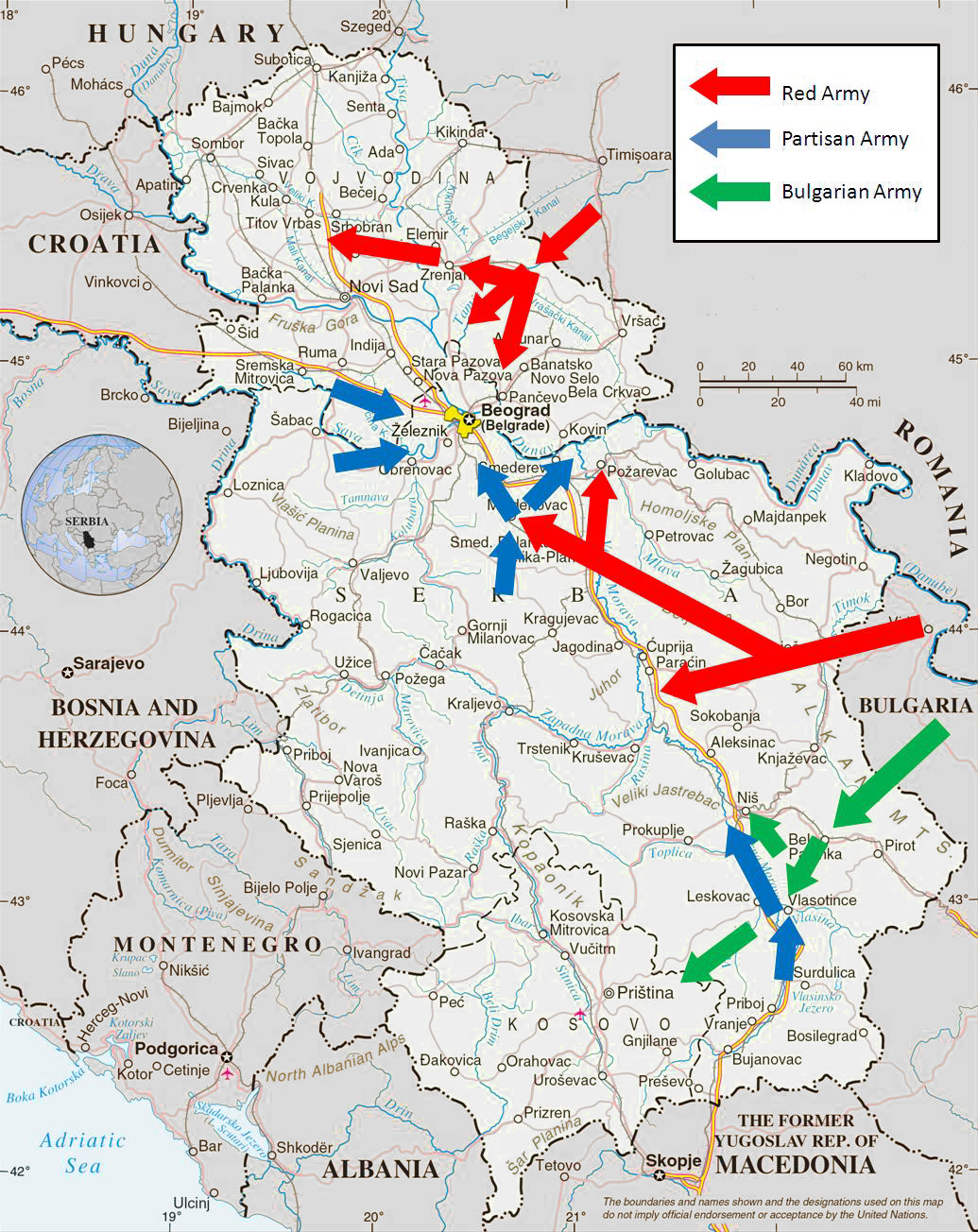
Map of the offensive.

Before the start of ground operations, the Soviet 17th Air Army (3rd Ukrainian Front) was ordered to impede the withdrawal of German troops from Greece and southern regions of Yugoslavia. To do so, it carried out air attacks on the railroad bridges and other important facilities in the areas of Niš, Skopje, and Kruševo lasting from 15 to 21 September.

=== Plan of the offensive ===
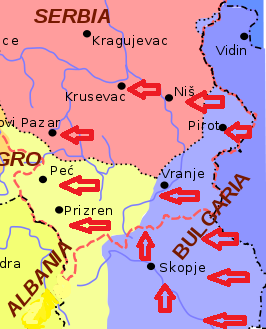
Map of the offensive of the Bulgarian troops in Yugoslavia in the autumn of 1944 (October–November). Its main task was to cover up the Soviet advance to Belgrade.

It was necessary for the Yugoslavs to break through German defensive positions on the Yugoslav-Bulgarian border to gain control of roads and mountain passages through eastern Serbia, to penetrate into the valley of the Great Morava river, and to secure the bridgehead on the western bank. This task was to be executed mainly by the 57th Army, and the Yugoslav XIV Army Corps was ordered to co-operate and support the Red Army attack behind the front line.

After the successful completion of the first stage, the plan was to deploy the 4th Guards Mechanized Corps to the bridgehead on the west bank. This Corps with its tanks, heavy weapons, and impressive firepower was compatible with the Yugoslav 1st Army Corps, which had significant, concentrated manpower, but was armed mainly with light infantry weapons. Once joined, these two formations were ordered to execute the main attack on Belgrade from the south. The advantages of this plan were the possibility of the rapid deployment of forces in the critical final stage of the offensive, and the possibility of cutting off German troops in eastern Serbia from their main forces.

=== First stage ===
==== Local situation ====
In January 1944, partisan operational units left the northern part of east Serbia under pressure from occupiers and auxiliary forces. Bulgarian garrisons, some German police forces, and Serbian Quisling troops, all under German command, and Chetniks, mostly commanded by agreements with the Germans, remained in the area. Partisan forces made up of the 23rd and 25th Divisions returned to the central parts of east Serbia in July and August 1944, forming a free territory with a makeshift runway in Soko Banja, thus securing both air supply of arms and ammunition, and allowing evacuation of the wounded. After the coup in Romania, the importance of the northern part of east Serbia had grown for both sides. In a race against each other the Partisans were better positioned and faster. 23rd Division, in a fierce battle with Order Police battalions and auxiliary forces, took Zaječar on 7 September, and on 12 September entered Negotin, while the 25th Division unsuccessfully attacked Donji Milanovac at the same time. Volunteers were joining the units in large numbers increasing their size. A new, 45th Serbian Division was formed on 3 September, and on 6 September, 14 Corps headquarters was established as a high command for the area of operations.

The Germans intervened with the 1st Mountain Division, reaching Zaječar on 9 September. Over the next week Partisans launched defensive attacks trying to deny the Germans access to the Danube at Negotin. On 16 September, when Red Army forces did not cross over from Romania as expected, the 14th Corps decided to abandon its defense of the Danube coastline, and to focus on attacking German columns maneuvering elsewhere.

On 12 September, near Negotin, a NOVJ delegation led by Colonel Ljubodrag Đurić crossed the Danube to the Romanian side, and establish contact with the Red Army 74th Rifle Division. The delegation was accompanied to Romanian territory by the 1st Battalion of the 9th Serbian Brigade; the 1st Battalion would fight with the 109th Regiment of 74th Rifle Division until 7 October.

In August 1944, Weichs ordered the concentration of his mobile forces in Serbia to combat the Partisans. This included: the 4th SS Police Division, the 1st Mountain Division, the 92nd Motorized Regiment, the 4th Brandenburg Regiment, the 191st Assault Brigade, and the 486th Armored Reconnaissance Troop. As a counter-measure to the events in Romania and Bulgaria, he ordered the 11th Luftwaffe Field Division, the 22nd Infantry, the 117th, the 104th Jäger Division, and the 18th SS Mountain Police Regiment to advance to Macedonia.

The 1st Mountain Division was withdrawn from operations against partisans in Montenegro, and was transported to the Niš area. On 6 September, it was placed under the command of General Hans Felber, tasked with establishing control on the Bulgarian border. By mid-September, the division won control of Zaječar and reached the Danube, at the area where the main attack was expected. The 7th SS Division under the command of the 2nd Panzer Army, attacked partisan units moving to Serbia from eastern Bosnia and Sandžak. This Division was subordinated to General Felber on 21 September, with the intention of launching an offensive against the partisans in western Serbia. However, due to the deteriorating situation on the eastern border, this offensive was canceled. Beginning at the end of September, the division was transferred to southeast Serbia, to guard the southern part of the Serbian front-line between Zaječar and Vranje. This enabled the 1st Mountain Division to concentrate on the north, in the area between Zaječar and Iron Gates. The 1st Mountain Division was strengthened by the 92 Motorized Regiment, the 2nd Brandenburg, and the 18th SS Mountain Police Regiment. Both divisions added men from sections of German units withdrawn from Romania, and Bulgaria, as well as from local formations. On 22 September, the 1st Mountain Division mounted an attack on the left bank of the Danube in order to gain control of the Iron Gates, but the plan failed when the 75th Corps of the Red Army, advancing in the opposite direction, launched an attack on the division.

==== Attack of the 57th Army ====
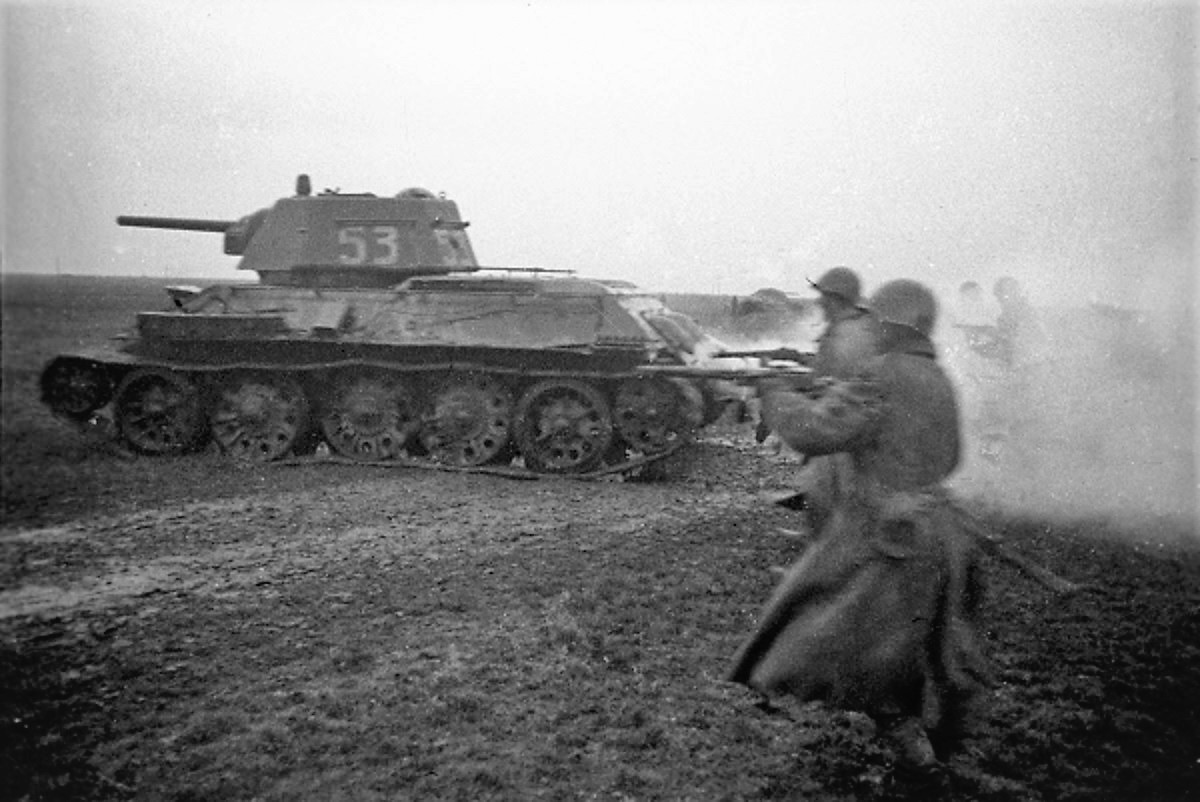
Troops of the 3rd Ukrainian Front on the offensive near Belgrade.

After the Second Jassy–Kishinev Offensive, a wide and deep area of possible advancement opened up in front of the Red Army. This started a race between the Soviets and the Germans to the "Blue Line", an intended front-line running from the southern slopes of the Carpathians over the Iron Gates down the Yugoslav-Bulgarian border. By the end of September, both the 2nd and the 3rd Ukrainian Front managed to deploy some 19 Rifle Divisions with supporting units to the line (compared to 91 Rifle Divisions in the Second Jassy–Kishinev Offensive). Vast terrain with poor and damaged roads, uncertainty over local forces, and logistical difficulties dispersed the German groups and slowed down their advancement. On the other side, Army Group F encountered much larger problems in concentrating their forces. This resulted in the Red Army achieving substantial superiority in numbers on the Blue Line by the end of September. Given this fact, and the prospect of cooperation with NOVJ, the offensive was launched.

First to reach the Iron Gates area were reconnaissance elements of the 75th Rifle Corps. On 12 September, they established contact with the partisans on the other side of the Danube. However, in the following days, the Germans succeeded in pushing out the partisans from the river bank, and launched a limited attack on Red Army elements across the Danube. According to the general plan, the 75th Corps was to be included in the composition of the 57th Army during its attack south of the Danube, and the completion of the 57th Army transfer to the Vidin area was not expected before 30 September. Having a fluid situation on the Yugoslav side of the Iron Gates, and a German attack across the Danube, 75th Corps launched its attack earlier, crossing the Danube on 22 September. After initial success, in the next days, the German 1st Mountain Division undertook a vigorous counter-attack, pushing the Soviets back to the shores of the Danube. Because of this, the 57th Army attack was launched on 27 and 28 September with troops brought in over night. Divisions of the 68th and the 64th Rifle Corps were introduced to the area from Negotin to Zaječar.

This attack by three Army Corps allowed the Red Army to gain supremacy on the combat line and to advance in spite of the stubborn German defense. On 30 September, Negotin was liberated and heavy fighting erupted in Zaječar.

Army Group F Command in Belgrade sought to bring more units to Belgrade as soon as possible. Weichs ordered the 104th Jäger Division to be transported immediately as soon as transport of the 117th Jäger Division was completed. However, transport from the south was hindered by partisan operations and Allied Air Force attacks. The 117th Jäger Division had been boarded on forty-four trains in Athens on 19 September, but only seventeen of them had reached Belgrade by 8 October. The 104th Jäger Division remained blocked in Macedonia. Because of the lack of troops at the front-line, on 29 September, Army Group F Command ordered a defensive assault by the 1st Mountain Division and the 92nd Motorized Brigade in an attempt to buy time. Assault Regiment Rhodes was transported to Belgrade by air without heavy weapons, but this method of transport could not meet the army's needs.

The attack on the German forces by three Soviet Rifle Corps, supported by the 14th Corps NOVJ, stretched between Donji Milanovac and Zaječar, gradually progressed, despite persistent resistance. The fight broke down into a number of skirmishes for the strong points in towns and on the crossroads and passes, and the Germans were forced to withdraw gradually. The 14th Corps NOVJ won control over communications behind the front-line, and the commander of the 57th Army sent his Chief of Staff Major General Verkholovich (Russian: Верхолович) to the 14th Corps Headquarters to coordinate actions. On 1 October, after a fierce battle, the 223rd Division of the 68th Corps seized an important crossroad in the village of Rgotina, 10 km to the north of Zaječar. Another important crossroad in Štubik fell on 2 October after a bitter battle. On 3 October, parts of the 223rd Division and the 7th and 9th Serbian Brigade of the 23rd Division NOVJ liberated Bor, important for its large copper mine. In Bor the 7th and 9th Brigade liberated some 1,700 forced laborers, mostly Jews from Hungary.

Because of successful attacks, by 4 October, German forces in front of the Soviet 57th Army were separated into three battle groups with no contact with each other. Battle group Groth holding Zaječar was the southernmost, battle group Fisher held positions in the middle, and battle group Stettner (named after the 1st Mountain Division commander) held grounds in mountains further to the north. Having firm control of the crossroads in their area, Soviet command decided to postpone a decisive attack on the German battle groups and to exploit the open roads with mobile forces for deeper penetration. On 7 October, the 5th Guards Motorized Rifle Brigade, reinforced with a self-propelled artillery regiment and an anti-tank regiment, marched from Negotin over Rgotina and Žagubica to Svilajnac. In twenty-four hours the brigade performed a 120 km long march-maneuver, reaching the Great Morava valley on 8 October, leaving German frontline forces far behind. The next day, 9 October, the 93rd Rifle Division broke into the Great Morava valley through Petrovac. The division commander formed a special task force under Captain Liskov, to capture the only 30-ton bridge over the river near the village of Donje Livadice. Captain Liskov's group successfully neutralized German guards and prevented them from mining the bridge which held great importance for the remaining course of the offensive. On 10 October, the 93rd Rifle Division and the 5th Motorized Brigade secured the bridgehead on the west bank of the Great Morava river.

On 7 October 64th Rifle Corps units, together with elements of 45th Division NOVJ, finally managed to break the steadfast resistance of battle group Groth and took Zaječar. At the same time, owing to great efforts by engineering units, the 4th Guards Mechanized Corps' transports reached the Vidin area. On 9 October, the Corps moved through Zaječar heading to the bridge over the Great Morava. After crossing the bridge, on 12 October, in the area of Natalinci, 12 km east of Topola, the Corps met the 4th Brigade of the 21st Serbian Division. The 4th Guards Mechanized Corps, with its 160 tanks, 21 self-propelled guns, 31 armored cars, and 366 guns and mortars, had impressive firepower. Together with the Yugoslav 1st Proletarian Corps concentrated in the area, the 4th Guards Mechanized Corps formed the main attack force for the direct assault on Belgrade. With this concentration of forces in the area west of Great Morava, the first phase of the offensive was successfully concluded.

=== Second stage ===
==== German counter-measures ====
On 2 October, the German command structure was reorganized and General Friedrich-Wilhelm Müller, former commander of German forces on Crete, resumed command over the front-line south of the Danube. His Corps headquarters was located in Kraljevo. General Wilhelm Schneckenburger retained command of the forces north of the Danube and was tasked with the immediate defense of Belgrade. Both Corps commands were subordinated to General Felber's Army Detachment Serbia command, under Commander-in-Chief, South-east (Army Group F) High Command.

As Belgrade became a more unstable combat zone, on 5 October, Army Group F headquarters was relocated from Belgrade to Vukovar. Felber and Schneckenburger remained in Belgrade.

On 10 October, Army Group F command acknowledged that the Red Army had opened a hole in their front line and had penetrated the Great Morava valley. These Soviet forces threatened to proceed with a direct attack on Belgrade, cutting off the 1st Mountain Division, still stuck in combat in east Serbia, and to attack it from the rear. German Command stated its determination to close the hole with a counter-attack, but lacked troops for such an undertaking. With the impossibility of reinforcements coming from the south finally acknowledged, German Command was forced to seek more troops from 2nd Panzer Army. Previous deployment of forces to the front-line in Serbia had already cost 2nd Panzer Army the loss of a number of important towns, some permanently: (Drvar, Gacko, Prijedor, Jajce, Donji Vakuf, Bugojno, Gornji Vakuf, Tuzla, Hvar, Brač, Pelješac, Berane, Nikšić, Bileća, Trebinje, Benkovac, Livno), and some temporarily: (Užice, Tešanj, Teslić, Slavonska Požega, Zvornik, Daruvar, Pakrac, Kolašin, Bijelo Polje, Banja Luka, Pljevlja, Virovitica, Višegrad, and Travnik). A new defensive plan, put into operation on 10 October, allowed the 2nd Panzer Army to abandon most of the Adriatic coast, and to form a new defensive line from the mouth of Zrmanja eastwards, relying on mountain ranges and fortified towns. This defensive line was to be held with three 'legionnaire' divisions (the 369th, the 373rd and the 392nd), and it was to allow Germans to draw out two divisions (the 118th and the 264th) for use in critical areas. However, due to the failure of the 369th Division, only two battalion-strong battle-groups of the 118th Division were sent to Belgrade, while the 264th was caught in the offensive of the 8th Yugoslav Corps, and was eventually destroyed in the Knin area.

==== Activities on the flanks ====
Operations began on the far southern flank of the front with an offensive by the 2nd Bulgarian Army into the Leskovac-Niš area, which almost immediately engaged the infamous 7th SS Mountain Division "Prinz Eugen". Two days later, having encountered the Yugoslav Partisans, the Army with Partisan participation defeated a combined force of Chetniks and Serbian Frontier Guards and occupied Vlasotince. Using its Armored Brigade as a spearhead, the Bulgarian Army then engaged German positions on 8 October at Bela Palanka, reaching Vlasotince two days later. On 12 October, the Armored Brigade, supported by the 15th Brigade of the 47th Partisan Division, was able to take Leskovac, with the Bulgarian reconnaissance battalion crossing the Morava and probing toward Niš. The goal of this was to not so much to pursue the remnants of the "Prinz Eugen" Division withdrawing northwest, but for the Bulgarian 2nd Army to begin the liberation of Kosovo which would have finally cut the route north for the German Army Group E withdrawing from Greece. On 17 October, the leading units of the Bulgarian Army reached Kuršumlija, and proceeded to Kuršumlijska Banja. On 5 November, after negotiating the Prepolac Pass with heavy losses, the Brigade occupied Podujevo, but was unable to reach Pristina until the 21st.

On the northern face of the offensive, the Red Army 2nd Ukrainian Front's supporting 46th Army advanced in an attempt to outflank the German Belgrade defensive position from the north, by cutting the river and rail supply lines running along the Tisa. Supported by the 5th Air Army, its 10th Guards Rifle Corps was able to rapidly perform assault crossings of the rivers Tamiš and Tisa north of Pančevo to threaten the Belgrade-Novi Sad railroad. Further to the north the Red Army 31st Guards Rifle Corps advanced toward Petrovgrad (modern-day Zrenjanin), and the 37th Rifle Corps advanced toward, and crossed the Tisa to threaten the stretch of railway between Novi Sad and Subotica, and to prepare for the planned Budapest strategic offensive operation.

== Assault on Belgrade ==
=== Approaching Belgrade ===
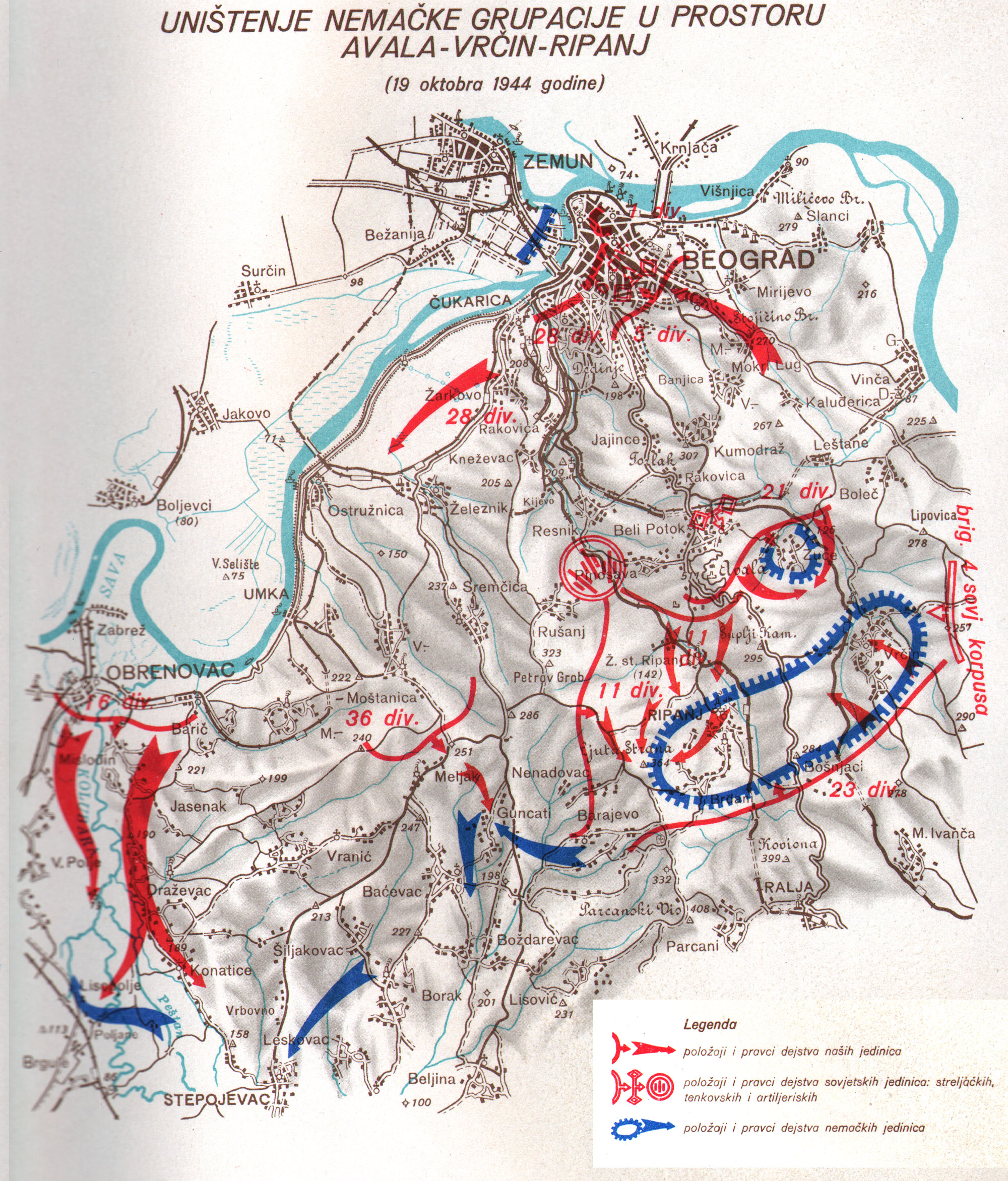
Fighting around Belgrade.

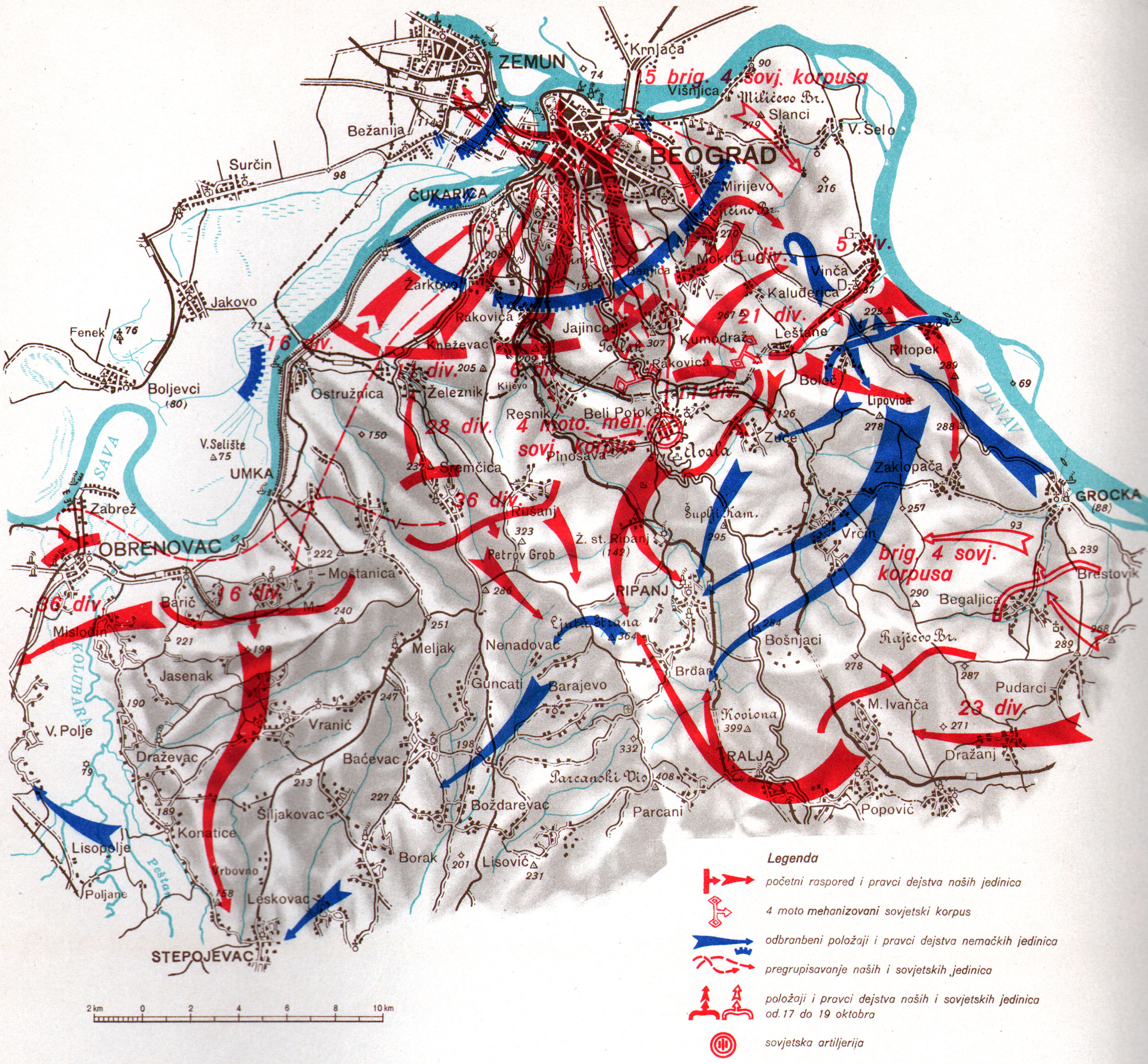
Belgrade operation.

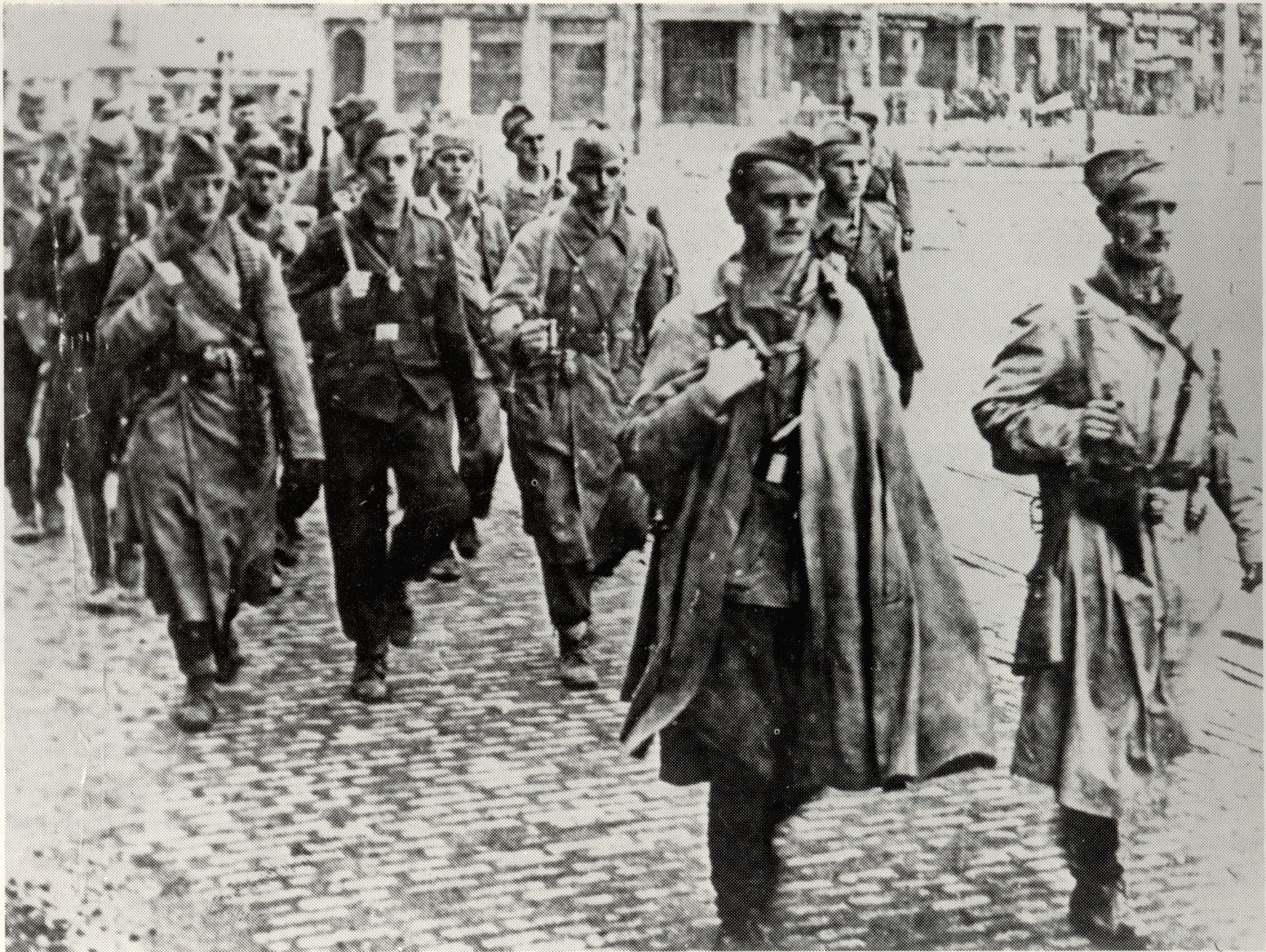
Yugoslav Partisans in liberated Belgrade, October 1944.

On 12 October, of the whole area between Kragujevac and Sava, with the exception of Belgrade, the Germans held only solitary strongholds in Šabac, Obrenovac, Topola and Mladenovac, while the areas in between were under the control of NOVJ. After the liberation of Valjevo, divisions of the 12th Corps, and the 6th (Lika) Division, and scattered Chetniks, pushed back German battle-group von Jungenfeld south of Šabac, and entered the area between Belgrade and Obrenovac. Chetnik elements that had retreated to Belgrade were transported to Kraljevo by the Germans on 3–5 October. 1st and 5th (Krajina) Division held Topola and Mladenovac under pressure, and were reinforced by the 21st Division, which marched in from the south.

On that day, all of the 4th Guards Mechanized Corps was concentrated to the west of Topola. The Germans formed two combat groups to defend against an attack intended to force them back across the Great Morava. The attack of the southern combat group from Kragujevac was easily blocked, and the northern battle group was dealt with by the Corps along its advancement towards Belgrade. The main direction of attack, along a line between Topola and Belgrade, was entrusted to the 36th Tank Brigade, the 13th and 14th Guards Mechanized Brigade of Red Army, and to the 1st, 5th, and 21st division NOVJ. The task of penetrating the line in an additional direction, on the right flank, towards the Danube and Smederevo, was given to the 15th Guards Mechanized Brigade, reinforced by the 5th Independent Mechanized Brigade, two artillery regiments, and the 1st Brigade of 5th Division NOVJ.

The final run towards Belgrade started on 12 October. An auxiliary right flank attack on the 15th Guards Mechanized Brigade, and the 1st Brigade of 5th Division, allowed NOVJ to reach the Danube near Boleč late in the evening of 13 October, after a charge through the positions of the Brandenburgers. With this success, German forces were split into two separate groups: the Belgrade garrison to the west, and the battle-group retreating from eastern Serbia, which was then in the Smederevo area. The latter, consisting of the 1st Mountain Division, the 2nd Brandenburg Regiment, and elements of other units, under General Walter Stettner, was cut off from all other German units, and faced destruction. Efforts by this group to break through and to establish a link with the Belgrade garrison resulted in fierce fighting. In the following days, the 21st and 23 Division NOVJ were deployed to strengthen positions and to prevent the Germans from reuniting.

The 36th Tank Brigade led an attack in the main direction. With the 4th Battalion of the 4th Serbian Brigade boarded on tanks, the 36th headed towards Topola. Parts of the 5th Division NOVJ (10th Krajina Brigade) were attacking the Topola garrison from the west when tanks of 36th Tank Brigade suddenly appeared from the east. After a short but intense artillery bombardment, the German garrison was overrun with a joint charge. The 36th Tank Brigade continued northwards without delay, and 9 kilometers north of Topola encountered a German assault gun battalion marching in the opposite direction. After a short but fierce clash, with serious losses on both sides, the 36th Tank Brigade overran the Germans on the move, and proceeded to the north. Before 12 October was over, with the assistance of the 3rd and 4th Krajina Brigade NOVJ, the 36th Tank Brigade also overran the garrison at Mladenovac, the last important obstacle before Belgrade, in a manner similar to the action at Topola. With Mladenovac cleared, the way to Belgrade was wide open.

=== On the streets of Belgrade ===
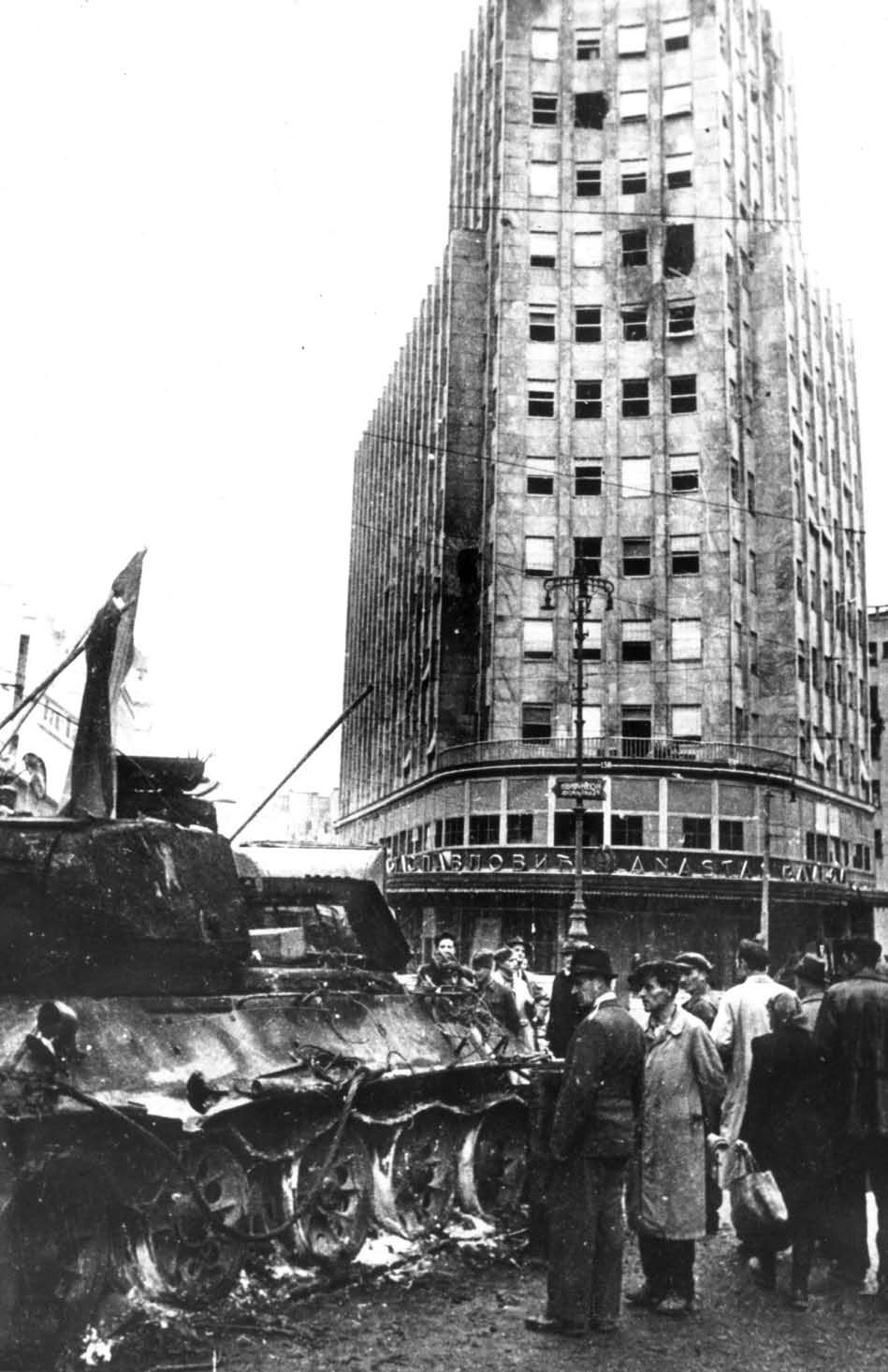
A destroyed Red Army T-34-85 tank in Belgrade (Palace Albanija in the background)

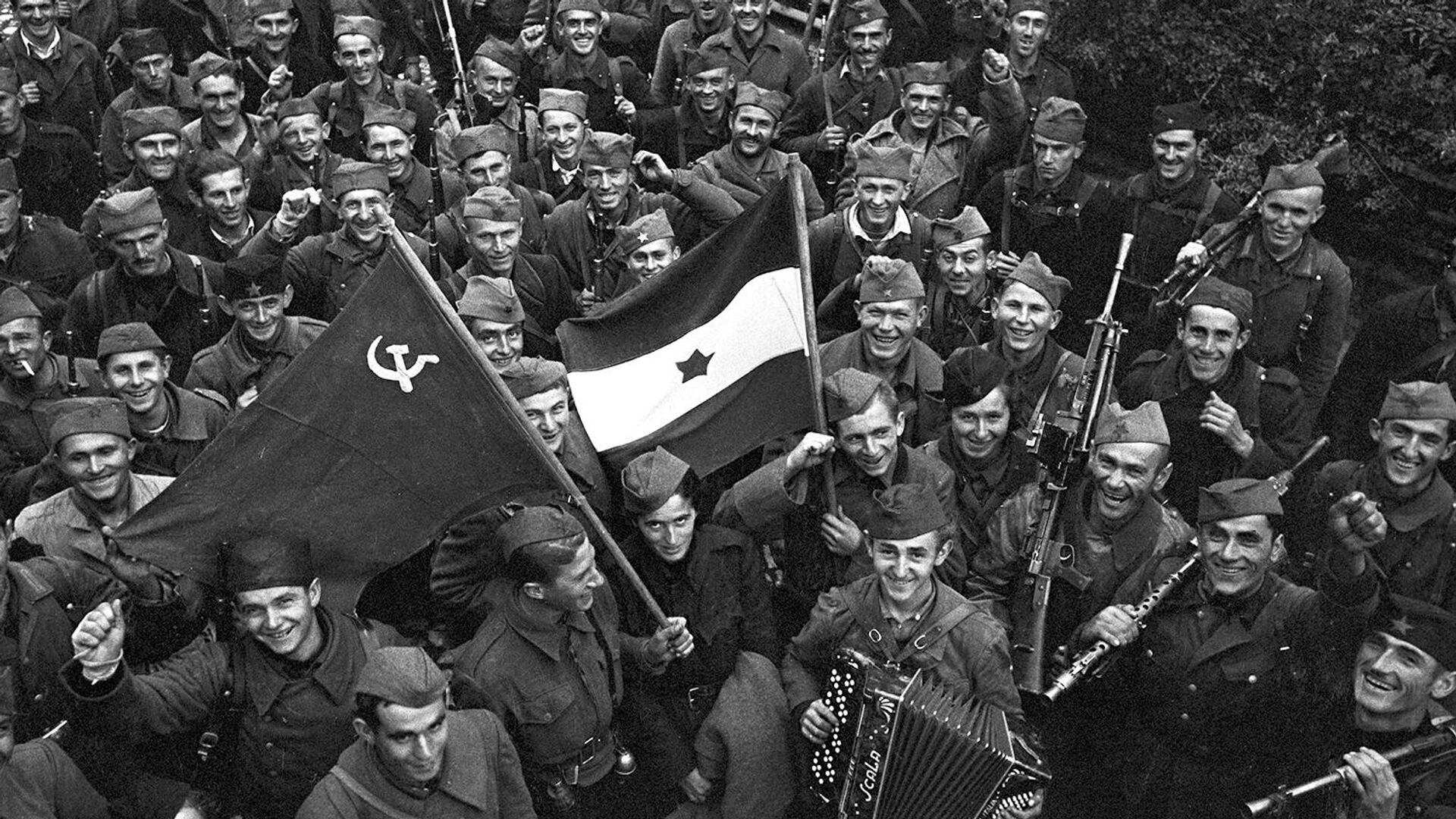
Red Army soldiers and Yugoslav partisans displaying the flags of their countries in Belgrade, 20 October 1944

The 4th Guards Mechanized Corps of the Red Army broke through the enemy resistance south of Belgrade on 14 October, and approached the city. The Yugoslavs advanced along the roads in the direction of Belgrade south of the Sava River, while the Red Army engaged in fighting on the northern bank outskirts. The assault on the city was delayed due to the diversion of forces for the elimination of thousands of German troops surrounded between Belgrade and Smederevo to the south-east. On 20 October, Belgrade had been completely overrun by joint Soviet and Yugoslav forces.

The Yugoslav 13th Corps, in cooperation with the Bulgarian 2nd Army, advanced from the south-east. They were responsible for the area of Niš and Leskovac. They were also responsible for cutting off the main evacuation route of Army Group E along the South Morava and Morava Rivers. Army Group E was forced to retreat through the mountains of Montenegro and Bosnia and was unable to re-enforce German units in Hungary.

The Soviet 10th Guards Rifle Corps of the 46th Army (2nd Ukrainian Front), together with units of the Yugoslav Partisans moving via the Danube, provided more offensive strength from the north-east against the Wehrmacht's position in Belgrade. They cleared the left bank of the Tisa and Danube (in Yugoslavia) and took the town of Pančevo.

== Allied forces ==
Participating in the assault on the capital of Yugoslavia were:

=== Soviet Union ===
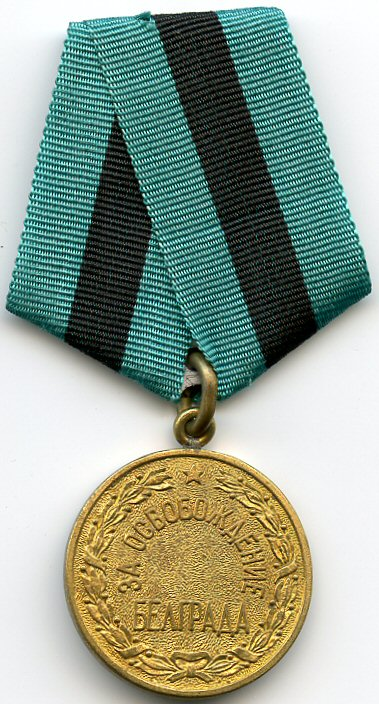
The Liberation of Belgrade Medal was awarded to c. 70,000 Soviet and allied service personnel who took part in the battle of Belgrade.

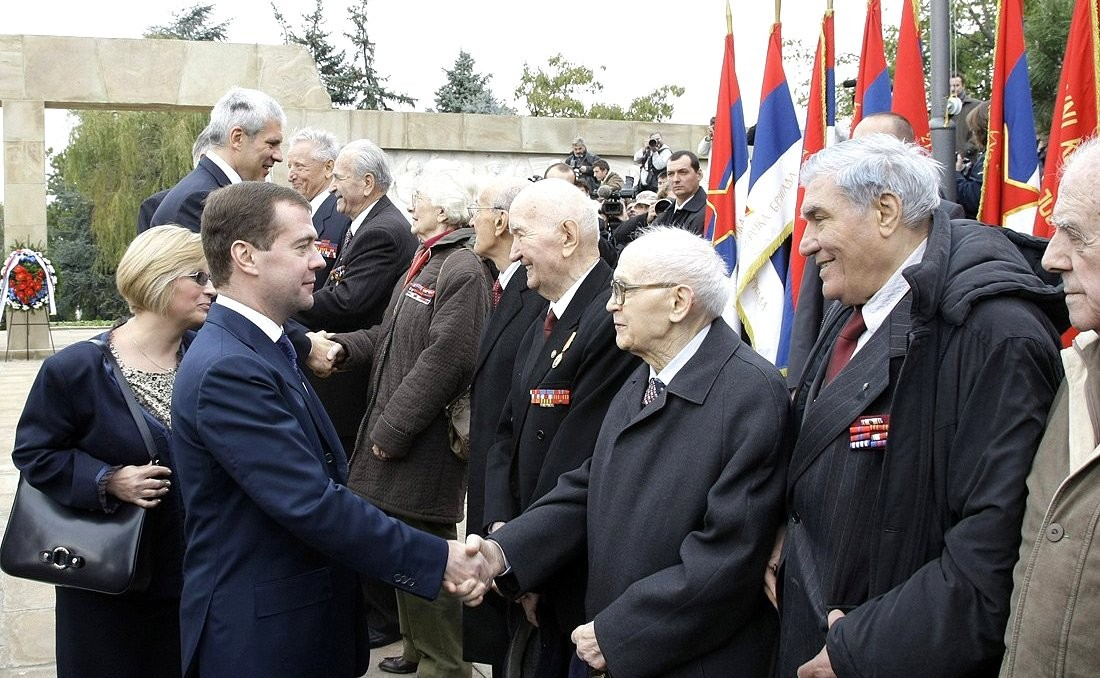
Boris Tadić and Dmitry Medvedev during celebrations for 65th anniversary

- 3rd Ukrainian Front (Marshal of the Soviet Union Fyodor Tolbukhin)
  - 4th Guards Mechanised Corps (General Lieutenant Vladimir Zhdanov)
    - 13th Guards Mechanised Brigade (Lieutenant Colonel Gennady Obaturov)
    - 14th Guards Mechanised Brigade (Colonel Nikodim Alekseyevich Nikitin)
    - 15th Guards Mechanised Brigade (Lieutenant Colonel Mikhail Alekseyevich Andrianov)
    - 36th Guards Tank Brigade (Colonel Pyotr Semyonovich Zhukov)
    - 292nd Guards Self-propelled Artillery Regiment (Lieutenant Colonel Semyon Kondratevich Shakhmetov)
  - 352nd Guards Heavy Self-propelled Artillery Regiment (Colonel Ivan Markovich Tiberkov);
  - 5th Guards Motor Rifle Brigade (Colonel Nikolai Ivanovich Zavyalov);
  - 23rd Howitzer Artillery Brigade (Colonel Savva Kirillovich Karpenko) of the 9th Breakthrough Artillery Division (Major General of Artillery Andrey Ivanovich Ratov)
  - 42nd Anti-tank destroyer artillery Brigade (Colonel Konstantin Alekseyevich Leonov)
  - 22nd Anti-aircraft Artillery Division (Colonel Igor Danshin)
- 57th Army (Colonel General Nikolai Gagen)
  - 75th Rifle Corps (Major General Andrian Zakharovich Akimenko)
  - 223rd Rifle Division (Colonel Akhnav Gaynutdinovich Sagitov)
    - 236th Rifle Division (Colonel Pyotr Ivanovich Kulizhskiy)
  - 68th Rifle Corps (Major General Nikolai Shkodunovich)
    - 73rd Guards Rifle Division (Major General Semyon Kozak)
- Danube Military Flotilla
  - Brigade of Armoured Boats (Captain Second Rank Pavel Ivanovich Derzhavin)
    - 1st Guards Armoured Boats Division (Lieutenant Commander Sergey Ignatevich Barbotko)
    - 4th Guards Armoured Boats Division (Senior Lieutenant Kuzma [Iosifovich] Butvin)
  - Coastal escort force (Major Klementiy Timofeevich Zidr)
- 17th Air Army (Vladimir Sudets)
  - 10th Assault Air Corps (lieutenant general of aviation Oleg Viktorovich Tolstyakov)
    - 295th Fighter Air Division (Colonel Anatoly Alexandrovich Silvestrov)
    - 306th Assault Air Division (Colonel Alexander Viktorovich Ivanov),
    - 136th Assault Air Division (part, Colonel Nikolai Pavlovich Terekhov)
    - 10th Guards Assault Air Division (Major General of Aviation Andrey Nikiforovich Vitruk)
    - 236th Fighter Air Division (Colonel Vasiliy Yakovlevich Kudryashov)
    - 288th Fighter Air Division (part, Colonel Boris Alexandrovich Smirnov)

=== Yugoslavia ===
- 1st Army Corps (General – Lieutenant Colonel Peko Dapčević)
  - 1st Proletarian Division (Colonel Vaso Jovanović)
  - 6th Proletarian Division (Colonel Đoko Jovanić)
  - 5th Assault Division (Colonel Milutin Morača)
  - 21st Assault Division (Colonel Miloje Milojević)
- 12th Army Corps (General – Lieutenant Danilo Lekić)
  - 11th Krajina Division
  - 16th Vojvodina Division
  - 28th Slavonian Division
  - 36th Vojvodina Division

=== Bulgaria ===
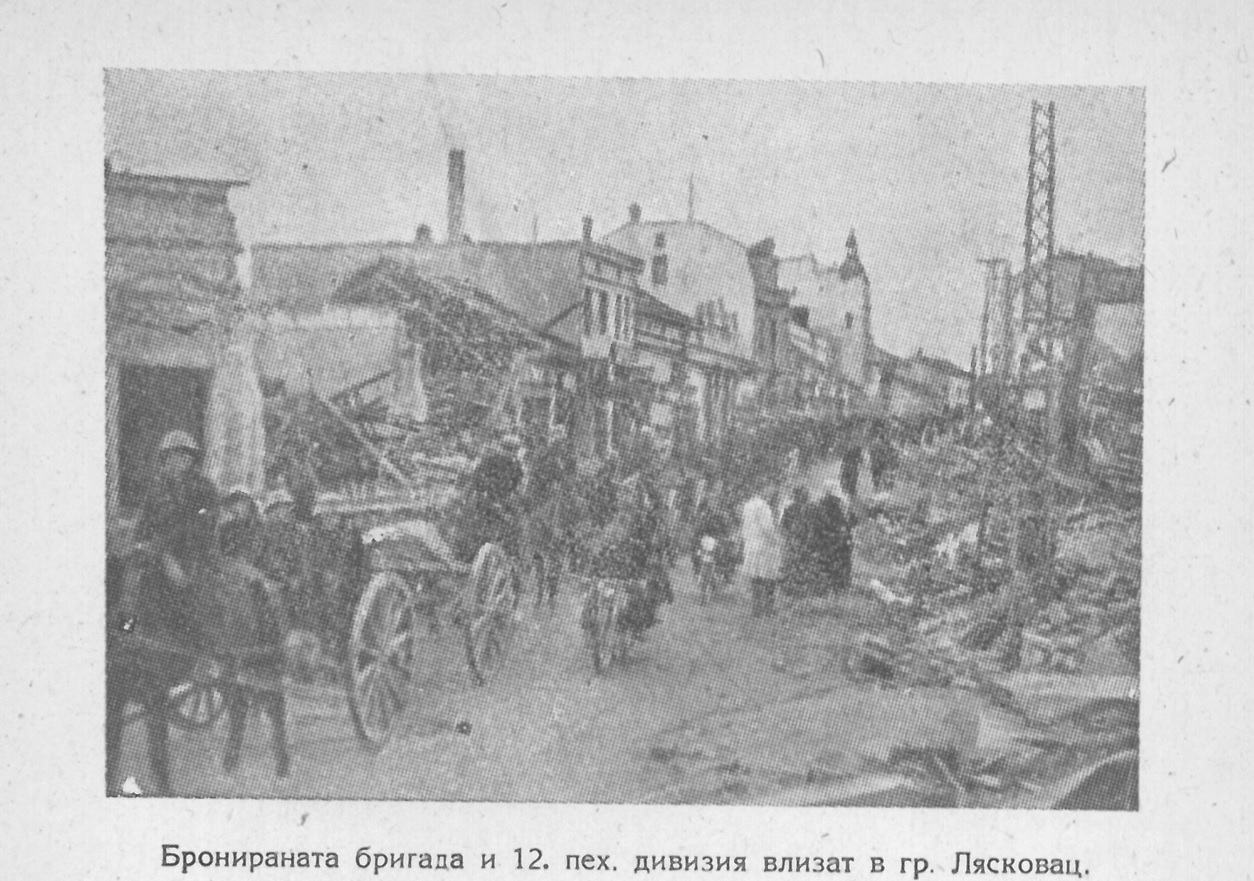
Bulgarian troops entering Leskovac.

- First Army (Bulgaria) (Vladimir Stoychev)
- Second Army (Bulgaria) (Kiril Stanchev)
- Fourth Army (Bulgaria) (Asen Sirakov)

By the end of the September, the First Army, together with the Bulgarian Second and Fourth Armies, was in full-scale combat against the German Army along the Bulgaria-Yugoslavia border, with Yugoslavian guerrillas on their left flank and a Soviet force on their right. They consisted of around 340,000 men. By December 1944, the First Army numbered 100,000 men. The First Army took part in the Bulgarian Army's advance northwards into the Balkan Peninsula with logistical support and under the command of the Red Army. The First Army, advanced into Serbia, Hungary and Austria in the spring of 1945, despite heavy casualties and bad conditions in the winter. During 1944–45, the Bulgarian First Army was commanded by Lieutenant-General Vladimir Stoychev.

== Aftermath ==
Upon completion of the Belgrade operation by the 57th Army with the Yugoslav 51st division in November, the bridgehead in Baranja, on the left bank of Danube was taken, causing an acute crisis for the German defense. The bridgehead served as a platform for the massive concentration of the 3rd Ukrainian Front troops for the Budapest offensive. The Red Army 68th Rifle Corps participated in the battles on the Kraljevo bridgehead and the Syrmian Front until mid-December, and were then transferred to Baranja. The Red Army Air Force Group "Vitruk" provided air support on the Yugoslav Front until the end of December.

The Yugoslav 1st Army Corps continued to push German forces westwards for some 100 km through Srem, where the Germans managed to stabilize a front in mid-December.

Having lost Belgrade and the Great Morava Valley, German Army Group E was forced to fight for a passage through the mountains of Sandžak and Bosnia, and its first echelons did not reach Drava until mid-February 1945.

In Soviet propaganda, this offensive (together with the Budapest Offensive and the East Carpathian Offensive) was listed as one of Stalin's ten blows.

== Commemoration of the battle ==
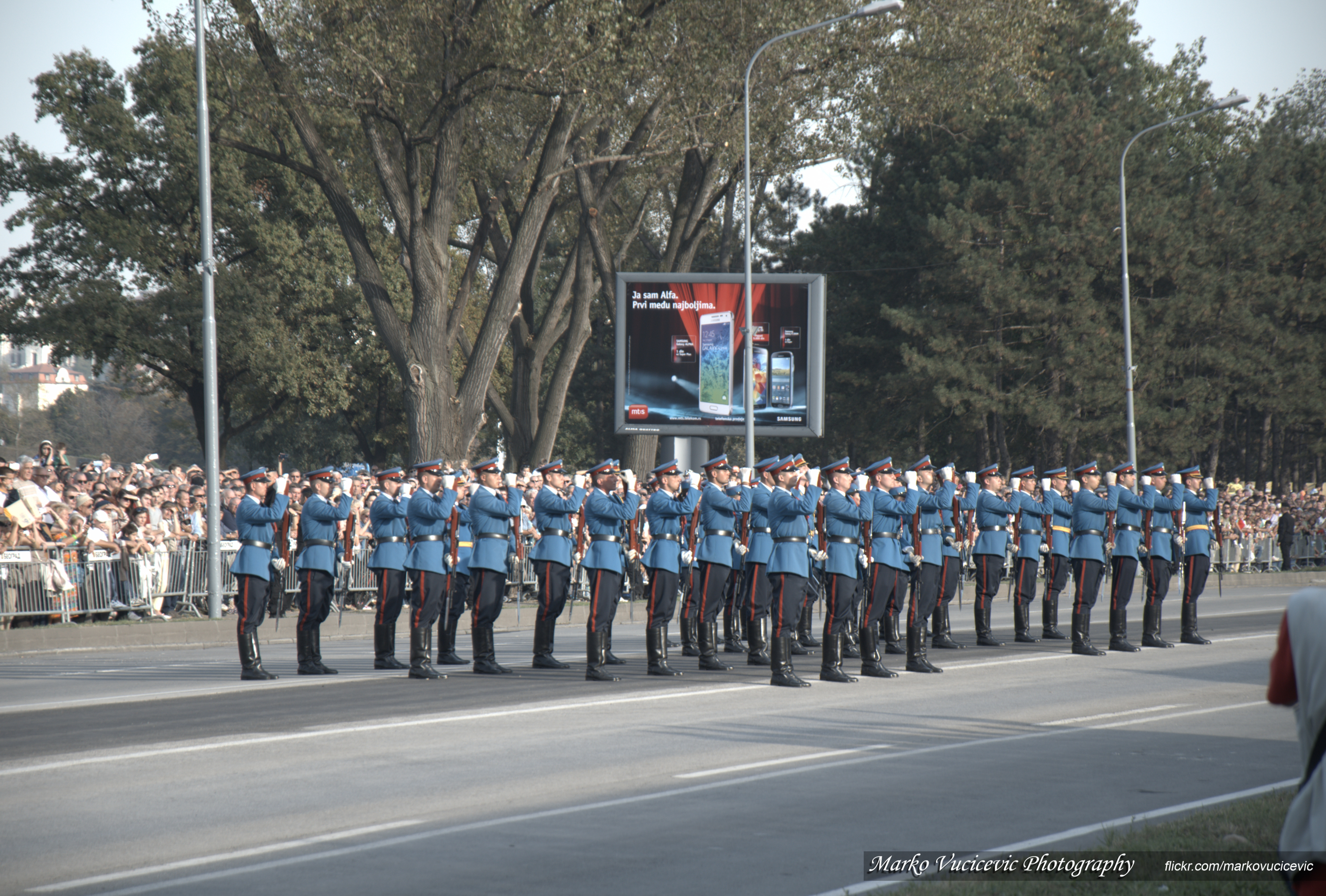
The Serbian Guards Unit during the final dress rehearsals of the Belgrade Military Parade.

A Medal "For the Liberation of Belgrade" was established by a decree of the Presidium of the Supreme Soviet on 19 June 1945. The Yugoslav People's Army held its second military parade on Revolution Boulevard (now King Alexander Boulevard) in honor of the one year anniversary of the end of the offensive. Since then, the country there has only been two military parades and high level celebrations in honor of the occasion in Yugoslavia and the Republic of Serbia, with the first one, the March of the Victor, being held on Nikola Tesla Boulevard with Russian President Vladimir Putin as the guest of honour.

Every jubilee anniversary is met with a significant Russian presence, often coming in the form of a state visit by the President of Russia or another high-ranking official to Belgrade. Beginning with Dmitry Medvedev in 2009 and continued with Vladimir Putin as aforementioned, the laying of wreaths of the President of Serbia and the leader of Russia takes place at the Liberators of Belgrade Memorial, which contains the remains of over 3,500 Yugoslav Partisans and Red Army soldiers who died during the offensive. In 2019, Medvedev represented Russia at the 75th anniversary celebrations in his position as Prime Minister instead of President Putin.

== See also ==
- World War II in Yugoslavia
- Seven anti-Partisan offensives
- Lothar Rendulic
- Resistance during World War II
- Niš operation
- Kosovo Operation (1944)

== Sources ==
- Biryuzov, Sergeĭ Semenovich; Hamović, Rade (1964). Beogradska operacija. Beograd: Vojni istoriski institut Jugoslovenske narodne armije.
- Dudarenko, M.L., Perechnev, Yu.G., Yeliseev, V.T., et.el., Reference guide "Liberation of cities": reference for liberation of cities during the period of the Great Patriotic War 1941–1945, Moscow, 1985
- Glantz, David, 1986 Art of War symposium, From the Vistula to the Oder: Soviet Offensive Operations – October 1944 – March 1945, A transcript of Proceedings, Center for Land Warfare, US Army War College, 19–23 May 1986
- Glantz, David M. & House, Jonathan (1995), When Titans Clashed: How the Red Army Stopped Hitler, Lawrence, Kansas: University Press of Kansas, ISBN 0-7006-0899-0.
- Krivosheyev, Grigoriy Fedotovich (1997). Soviet Casualties and Combat Losses in the Twentieth Century. Greenhill Books. ISBN 9781853672804.
- Maclean, Fitzroy (2002) [1949]. Eastern Approaches. Penguin Group. ISBN 9780140132717.
- Seaton, Albert, The fall of Fortress Europe 1943–1945, B.T.Batsford Ltd., London, 1981 ISBN 0-7134-1968-7
- Schmider, Klaus (2002). PartisanenKrieg in Jugoslawien 1941–1944. Hamburg, Berlin, Bonn: Verlag E.S. Mittler & Sohn GmbH. ISBN 3-8132-0794-3.
- Tomasevich, Jozo (2002). War and Revolution in Yugoslavia: 1941 – 1945. Stanford: Stanford University Press. ISBN 0-8047-0857-6.
- Dupuy, Ernest R., and Dupuy, Trevor N., The encyclopedia of Military History from 3500 B.C. to the present (revised edition), Jane's Publishing Company, London, 1980
- Mitrovski, Boro, Venceslav Glišić and Tomo Ristovski, The Bulgarian Army in Yugoslavia 1941–1945, Belgrade, Medunarodna Politika, 1971
- Wilmot, Chester, The Struggle for Europe, Collins, 1952
- Grechko, A.A., (ed.), Liberation Mission of the Soviet Armed Forces in the Second World War, Progress Publishers, Moscow, 1975
