= 1st Division (Yugoslav Partisans) =

1st Proletarian Division
- Flag of Democratic Federal Yugoslavia (used by the Partisans)
- Active: 1942–1945
- Country: Democratic Federal Yugoslavia
- Branch: Yugoslav Partisan Army
- Type: Infantry
- Size: ~3,200 (upon formation); 12,367 (end of 1944); 11,775 (15 April 1945)
- Part of: 1st Proletarian Corps
- Engagements: World War II in Yugoslavia

Commanders
- Notable commanders: Koča Popović

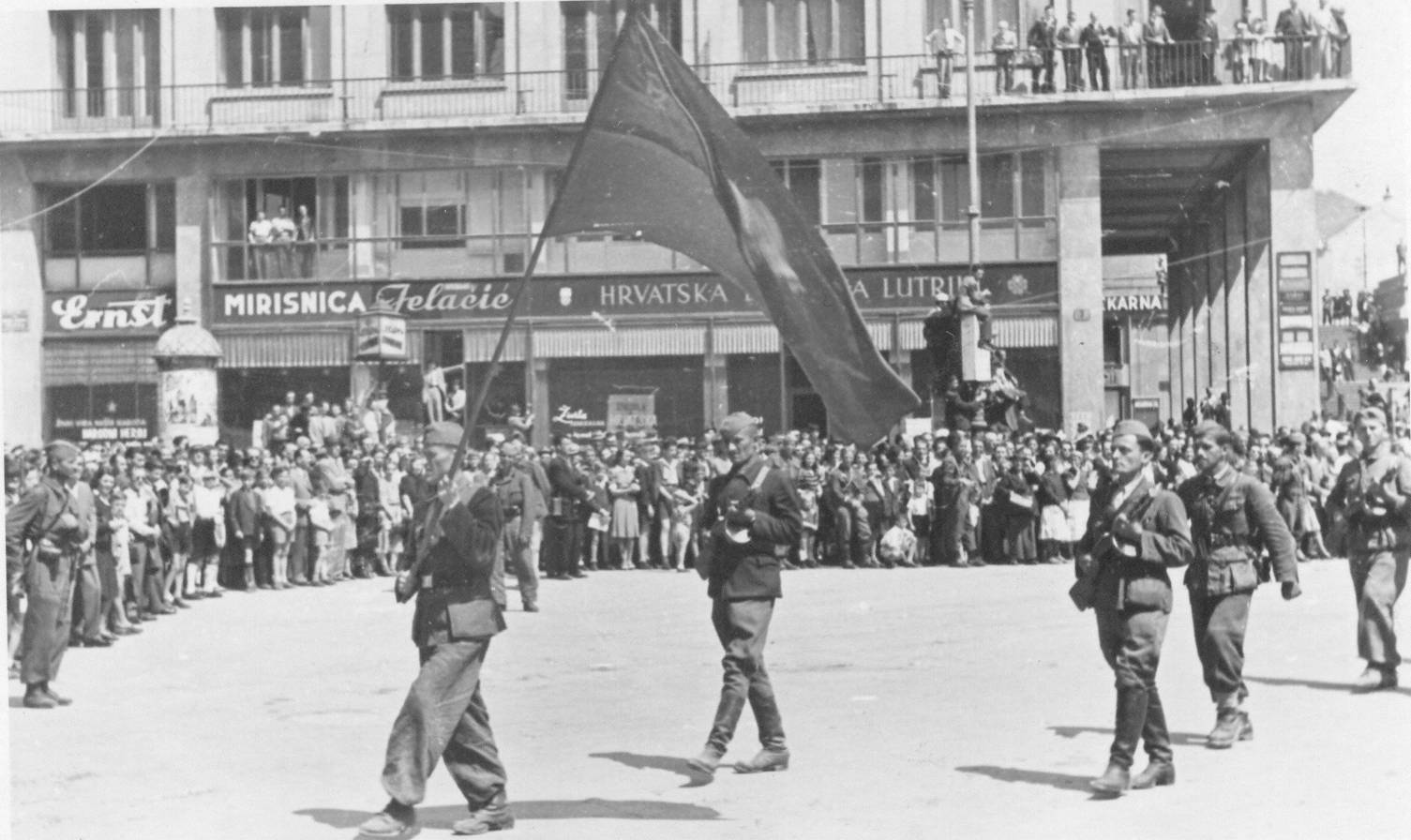
soldiers from the 1st Proletarian Division entering Zagreb on 8 May 1945

The First Proletarian Division of the NOVJ was formed on November 1, 1942 from the First Proletarian Brigade, the Third Proletarian Brigade and the Third Krajina Brigade in Bosanski Petrovac, under command of Koča Popović. It was considered one of the elite units of the NOVJ.

== The combat path of the First Proletarian Division ==
After its establishment, it undertook operations in central Bosnia. From November 19 to December 4, 1942, it destroyed the garrisons in Sitnica, Čađavica, Mrkonjić Grad, Jajce (in cooperation with the 3rd Division), Skender Vakuf and Kotor Varoš. During January 1943, it captured Teslić and Prnjavor.

During the Battle of the Neretva in the Neretva delta, it represented the left attack column, and took part in the counterattack near Gornji Vakuf and the fighting against the Chetniks near Nevesinje and Kalinovik.

During the Battle of Sutjeska, it took part in the attack in the Foča area at the end of May 1943, and played a major role in breaking through the encirclement at Zelengora, inflicting a heavy blow against the 369th (Croatian) Infantry Division.

In June 1943, the 3rd Sandzak Brigade left the division, and in November 1943, the 13th Proletarian Brigade joined the Division. From September 1, 1943, the First Proletarian Division was part of the 1st Proletarian Corps. The division also included the Seventh Krajina Brigade from mid-July to mid-August 1943, the Eighth Montenegrin Brigade from November 6, 1944 to February 7, 1945, the "Italy" Brigade (composed of Italian volunteers) from October 29, 1944, and the Artillery Brigade of November 21, 1944. Since November 1943, the Thirteenth Proletarian Strike Brigade "Rade Končar" has been included in its composition, with which it went through fierce fighting during the winter operations of 1944, known as Operation Reselšprung, the Durmitor Operation, the offensive in western Serbia in September 1944, the Belgrade offensive and the Syrmian Front.

At the end of 1944, the First Proletarian Division had 12,367 fighters, and on April 15, 1945, 11,775 fighters. Since January 1, 1945, it was part of the First Yugoslav Army.
The First Proletarian Division ended the War on May 20, 1945, stationed in the area around Trieste and Gorizia.

== Sources ==
- vojska.net
