= Ivan Rukavina =

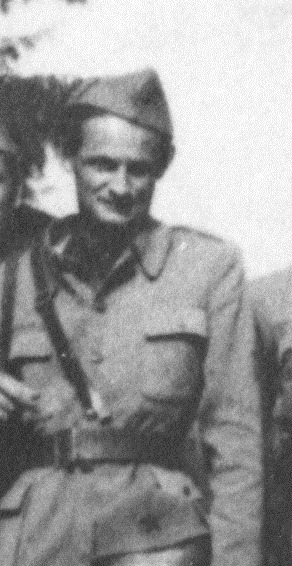
- Rukavina in 1943
- Born: January 26, 1912; Otočac, Kingdom of Croatia-Slavonia, Austria-Hungary
- Died: April 3, 1992 (aged 80); Zagreb, Croatia
- Military career
- Allegiance: Spanish Republic (1936–1939); Yugoslavia (1941–1977)
- Branch: International Brigades (1936–1939); Yugoslav Partisans (1941–1945); Yugoslav Ground Forces (1945–1977)
- Service years: 1936–1939; 1941–1977
- Rank: Captain (Spanish Republic); General of the Army (Yugoslavia)
- Unit: Dimitrov Battalion (Spanish Republic)
- Commands: Đuro Đaković Battalion (Spanish Republic); Chief of Staff of Croatia; 4th (Croatian) Corps; Vojvodina Military District; Zagreb Military District
- Conflicts: Spanish Civil War; World War II in Yugoslavia
- Awards: Order of the People's Hero; Order of the War Banner; Order of the Partisan Star; Order of Brotherhood and Unity; Order of Bravery; Commemorative Medal of the Partisans of 1941; Order of the Southern Cross
- Other work: Politician

Ivan Rukavina (January 26, 1912 – April 3, 1992) was army general of the Yugoslav People's Army, People's Hero of Yugoslavia and politician.

Rukavina was a member of the International Brigades and prominent Croatian and Yugoslav communist. He was a Partisan in World War II in Yugoslavia with a rank of general. After the war he was Deputy of the Minister of Defence of Yugoslavia and held various military high positions. He also supported Croatian Spring in the early 1970s and after the collapse of Yugoslavia he participated in founding of Croatian People's Party in 1990.

== Pre-war life ==
Rukavina was born in Otočac in Lika region, today's Croatia in noble family. He attended gymnasium in Gračac and Otočac and finished last class in Zagreb. After the gymnasium he became a medical student at the University of Zagreb. He joined to SKOJ in 1933 after he contacted with other communist sympathizers at the university.

As a member of SKOJ he was arrested few times. In 1934 he went to emigration, first he went to Vienna, and then, in 1935 to Prague when he became a member of the Communist Party of Yugoslavia. From 1935 to 1935 he worked in "Tehnika KPJ", a small printing house in Prague which planned to publish communist the newspaper "Proleter".

In time of preparation of conference of the Communist Party of Yugoslavia in Prague, he was arrested again, but soon released. In December 1936 he joined Spanish Republican Army and participated in Spanish Civil War. During the first stages of war he was a sergeant in Dimitrov Battalion. Soon he raised to rank of a captain and became commander of the Đuro Đaković Battalion.

After nationalists took control over Catalonia, Rukavina fled with rest of republican soldiers to France and was interned to a POW camp. Soon he escaped from the camp and returned to Yugoslavia. After he returned, he again became an active member of the Communist Party of Yugoslavia in Zagreb; he was especially active in SKOJ. Soon he became a member of the Regional Committee of the SKOJ in Croatia.

== World War II in Yugoslavia ==
During the April War, when Nazi Germany attacked Kingdom of Yugoslavia, he was a conscript in Nikšić. After Yugoslav capitulation he was in an Italian POW camp. After 15 days spent in POW camp, he escaped to Zagreb, and again he joined the activity of the Communist Party. During the first stages of rebellion he became a member of the Military Committee for Croatia in May 1941.

In June 1941 he went to Banija and participated in foundation of Sisak People's Liberation Partisan Detachment. After that, Rukavina returned to Zagreb, which was the capital of the Independent State of Croatia at the time, and at the beginning of August 1941 he went to Kordun where he also worked on the founding of partisan detachments. In November 1941 he became Chief of the General Staff of Croatia. He served in that role until 1943 when he became the commander of the 4th (Croatian) Corps of the Yugoslav Partisans. From November 1944 until February 1945 he was the commander of the Vojvodina Military District and after that he was the chief of the Yugoslav military mission in Paris.

== Post-war life ==
After the war, in SFR Yugoslavia he continued to be a professional soldier. He was the commander of the Zagreb Military District, the principal of the Military Academy of the Yugoslav People's Army, and also the Deputy of Minister of Defence. He retired from military service in 1977.

He also served in various political duties. On the 6th Congress and the 7th Congress of the Communist Party of Yugoslavia he was elected as a member of the Central Committee of the Communist Party. He was also a representative in the Federal Assembly of Yugoslavia and member of the Federation Council of the SFRY.

He received the Order of the People's Hero on December 20, 1951.

After the collapse of Yugoslavia, Rukavina was also an active politician in independent Croatia. He participated in the founding of the Croatian People's Party, a liberal party in Croatia.

Rukavina died in Zagreb on April 3, 1992.

== Sources ==
- (in Serbo-Croatian) Vojni leksikon, VZ, Beograd 1981.
- (in Croatian) Hrvatski leksikon, LGH, Zagreb 1997.
