= 8th Division (Yugoslav Partisans) =

8th Kordun Division
- Flag of Democratic Federal Yugoslavia (used by the Partisans)
- Active: 1942–1945
- Country: Democratic Federal Yugoslavia
- Branch: Yugoslav Partisan Army
- Type: Infantry
- Size: ~4,200 soldiers (upon formation)
- Part of: 15th Corps; 4th Army
- Engagements: World War II in Yugoslavia

Commanders
- Notable commanders: Vlado Ćetković

The 8th Kordun Assault Division (Serbo-Croatian Latin: Osma kordunaška divizija) was a Yugoslav Partisan division formed in Crevarska Strana on 22 November 1942. Upon on formation it consisted of 4th Kordun Brigade, 5th Kordun Brigade and 6th Littoral-Gora Brigade with total of around 4,200 soldiers. The division was commanded by Vlado Ćetković and its political commissar was Artur Turkulin. It took part in various Partisan operations in Croatia, Bosnia and Slovenia. It was declared an "Assault" division on 16 June 1944 by the Supreme Headquarters.
