= 4th Corps (Yugoslav Partisans) =

The 4th Corps (Serbo-Croatian Latin: Četvrti korpus) was a Yugoslav Partisan corps that fought against the Germans, Independent State of Croatia (NDH) and Chetniks in occupied Democratic Federal Yugoslavia during World War II.

It was created on 22 November 1942 with the 6th Lika, 7th Banija and 8th Kordun divisions as the 1st Croatian Corps. It was renamed the 4th (Croatian) Corps on 5 October 1943.
Commander of the Corps was Ivan Gošnjak and later Ivan Rukavina. Political Comissar Većeslav Holjevac, future Mayor of Zagreb.

It operated in Croatia, South of the Sava river and in the Una river valley. During the Fourth Axis offensive (Operation Weiss), the Corps was heavily engaged in the Banija and Kordun area's and defended the liberated area of Lika. During 1943, it conducted successful actions and created liberated territory between the rivers Una and Sava, in Slovenia, Gorski Kotar and Lika.

In the 1945 final operations of the Yugoslav Army, the Corps participated in the liberation of Bihać, Lika, Karlovac and Zagreb. It was disbanded on 15 May 1945.

== Sources ==
- vojska.net
