= 3rd Division (Yugoslav Partisans) =

3rd Assault Division
- Flag of Democratic Federal Yugoslavia (used by the Partisans)
- Active: 1942–1945
- Country: Democratic Federal Yugoslavia
- Branch: Yugoslav Partisan Army
- Type: Infantry
- Size: ~3200 (upon formation)
- Part of: 2nd Corps
- Nickname: Montenegrin Division
- Engagements: World War II in Yugoslavia

Commanders
- Notable commanders: Pero Ćetković

The 3rd Assault Division (Treća udarna divizija) was a Yugoslav Partisan division formed in Glamočko polje on 9 November 1942. Upon its formation it had around 3,200 soldiers from three brigades: 5th Proletarian Brigade, 10th Herzegovina Brigade and 1st Dalmatia Brigade. It was commanded by Pero Ćetković and its political commissar was Radomir Babić. During the Operation Schwarz, the division was disestablished after suffering heavy losses. It was re-established during the late September 1943 as a part of the 2nd Corps.
