= 21st Division (Yugoslav Partisans) =

21st Serbian Division
- Flag of Democratic Federal Yugoslavia (used by the Partisans)
- Active: 1944–1945
- Country: Democratic Federal Yugoslavia
- Branch: Yugoslav Partisan Army
- Type: Infantry
- Size: ~1,000 (upon formation)
- Engagements: World War II in Yugoslavia

Commanders
- Notable commanders: Miloje Milojević

The 21st Assault Serbian Division (Serbo-Croatian Latin: Dvadesetprva udarna srpska divizija) was a Yugoslav Partisan division formed on Radan mountain on 20 May 1944. It was formed as 1st Serbia Division, but it was renamed on 14 June 1944. Upon formation it had around 1,000 soldiers in three brigades, those being: the 4th, 5th and 6th Serbia Divisions. The commander of the division was sr:Miloje Milojević. The division mostly fought against Chetniks and Germans in occupied Serbia.
