= Bihać operation =

Part of World War 2 in Yugoslavia

Bihać Operation
- Part of World War II in Yugoslavia
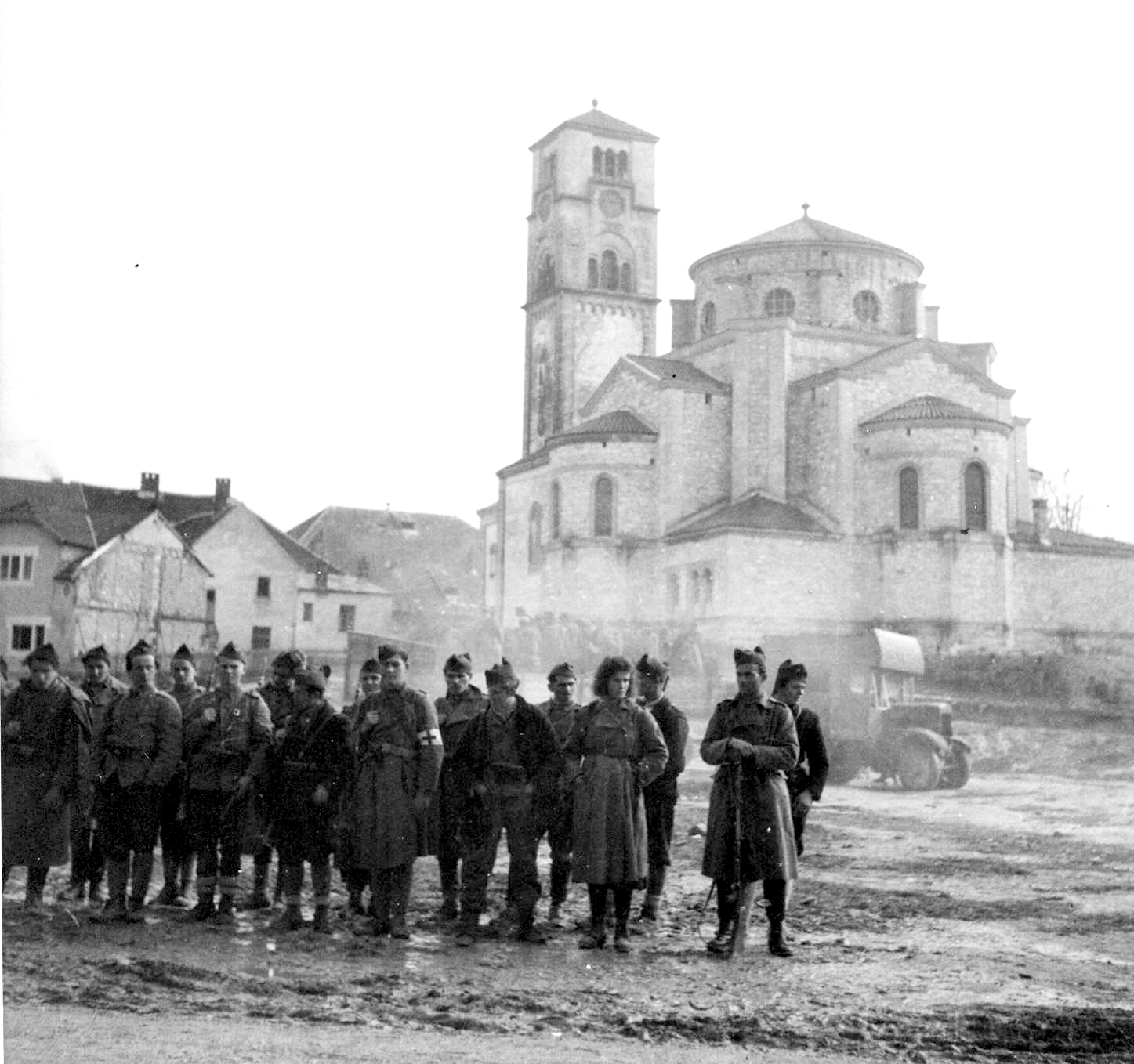
- Partisans in Bihać after capturing the city
| Date | 2–15 November 1942 |
| Location | Bihać and surrounding areas 44°49′N 15°52′E |
| Result | Partisan victory |

Belligerents
| Yugoslav Partisans | Independent State of Croatia (Nazi Germany) Germany |

Commanders and leaders
| Kosta Nađ; Mile Tubić †; Ranko Šipka; Nikola Karanović; Josip Mažar Šoša; Stanko Bjelajac; Nikola Vidović; Milan Šakić Mićun | (Independent State of Croatia) Delko Bogdanić (Nazi Germany) Friedrich Stahl |

Units involved
| 1st Krajina Assault Brigade; 2nd Krajina Assault Brigade; 3rd Krajina Assault Brigade; 4th Krajina Assault Brigade; 5th Krajina Assault Brigade; 8th Banovina Assault Brigade; 4th Kordun Assault Brigade; 2nd Lika Proletariat Assault Brigade | (Independent State of Croatia) Ustaše Militia: Fourth Standing Active Brigade; (Independent State of Croatia) Croatian Home Guard: 2nd Infantry Regiment; 12th Infantry Regiment; (Nazi Germany) 714th Infantry Division |

Strength
| 7,000 soldiers | 4,000 soldiers |

Casualties and losses
| 130 killed Over 200 wounded | 650 killed 860 imprisoned |

The Bihać operation was a military operation conducted by Yugoslav partisans against the Independent State of Croatia (NDH) and Nazi Germany during World War II. The aim of the operation was to capture Bihać and the surrounding towns to connect Partisan held areas in Bosanska Krajina, and Knisnka Krajina. The battle for the city of Bihać lasted from 2 November to 4 November 1942. After capturing the city, the partisans continued to fight in surrounding areas until 15 November. The operation resulted in a major Partisan victory, with Bihać and the surrounding areas being captured, and the NDH suffering significant casualties.

After the Partisans captured Bihać, the Bihać Republic was formed, and consisted of all the Partisan-held areas in Croatia connected by the capture of Bihać. Bihać became the center of the Yugoslav Partisan movement.

== Background ==
Bihać came under Axis control during the April war. Following this, there were many skirmishes between the Partisans and Axis forces near the city. This led to the Ustaše putting great effort into fortifying the city and the surrounding villages.

The Yugoslav Partisans moved their supreme headquarters from Užice (in Serbia), to Foča (in Bosnia) in January 1942. On 10 May 1942, the Partisans moved their HQ further west to more easily coordinate operations in Bosnia. Partisan operations in Bosnia were a success, and many towns had come under their control by August 1942. In Bosnia, the towns of Drvar, Bosanski Petrovac, Ključ, Glamoč, and Mrkonjić-Grad were under Partisan control. In Croatia, the Partisans held the towns of Korenica, Vojnić and Vrginmost, and many other locations.

On 1 November 1942, Josip Broz Tito gave an order for Yugoslav Partisans to be reformed into a regular army. There were several changes made to the army, but the two most important changes were allowing local headquarters to have more autonomy, and the formation of divisions.

== Units involved ==
=== Yugoslav Partisans ===
Four Partisan brigades from Bosnia and three from Croatia were involved in the operation led by Kosta Nađ. In total, around 7,000 soldiers participated in it.

==== Units from Bosnia ====
Six brigades of Yugoslav Partisans from Bosnia participated in the Bihać operation, those were:

- 1st Krajina Assault Brigade - Of the Brigade's four battalions only the 4th Battalion did not participate in the battle.
- 2nd Krajina Assault Brigade - The entire brigade, led by Ranko Šipka, participated in the operation.
- 3rd Krajina Assault Brigade - It's four battalions participated in the operation; the brigade was commanded by Nikola Karanović.
- 5th Krajina Assault Brigade - The entire brigade, headed by Josip Mažar Šoša, took part in the battle.
- 6th Krajina Assault Brigade - Only the 3rd Battalion was involved in the operation.

==== Units from Croatia ====
Three brigades of Yugoslav Partisans from Croatia took part in the Bihać operation, those were:

- 8th Banovina Assault Brigade - The Brigade's three battalions, led by Stanko Bjelajac, participated in the operation.
- 4th Kordun Assault Brigade - The entire brigade led by Nikola Vidović, was involved in the battle.
- 2nd Lika Assault Brigade - All four of the Brigades battalions took part in the operation; they were led by Milan Šakić Mićun.

=== Axis powers ===
One brigade of the Ustaše militia, two regiments of the Croatian Home Guard and one German infantry division fought the partisans during the Bihać operation. They were led by Friedrich Stahl. In total, around 4,000 soldiers fought during the operation.

Four of the five battalions of the 4th Standing Active Brigade of the Ustaše militia defended Bihać: the 19th Ustaše Battle Battalion, the 31st Ustaše Battle Battalion, the 32nd Ustaše Battle Battalion and the 33rd Ustaše Battle Battalion. Delko Bogdanić commanded the Brigade.

Two battalions of 2nd and 12th Croatian Home Guard's infantry regiments were stationed in the city.

The 714th Infantry Division of Nazi Germany was also involved in the battle led by Friedrich Stahl.

== Plan of the defense of Bihać ==
At the time of the operation, Bihać was controlled by members of the Ustaše, who had heavily fortified the city because of its strategic importance and fighting in the city's environs. The Ustaše's plan for the defense of Bihać included placing their defenses in a wider area around the city, relying mostly on the Una river. This was done to prevent an attacker from rising and quickly penetrating the city. The defense of external strongholds was intended to create the necessary time to collect reserves and carry out counterattacks to defend against an attack. Counterattacks would be launched from the city or, as a last resort, from fortifications on the narrower belt of defense. If forces and reserves from Bihać and the surrounding region could not repel an attack, reinforcements from the surrounding garrisons would be brought in.

The defense of Bihać was circular, in two belts. The goal of such a defense was to close the approaches to the city, prevent a sudden attack, and to retain control of the city at all costs because of its strategic importance. The outer belt of defense included several villages (Kurtovo Selo, Ostrožac, Prošiće, Brekovica, Pokoj, Ličko Petrovo Selo, Zavalje, Skočaj, Dobrenica and Golubić), and the inner several strongholds (Ribić, Rasadnik, Cekrlije, Vinica, Založje, Cavkiće, Bakšaiš, Hatinac, Žegar, Somišlje and Privilica). The Ustaše manned these defensive belts with groups of their forces; their flanks were stationed on the Una. The strongholds were very well fortified, especially Somišlje and Žegar with Žegar alley and Borik on the Una's left bank. In addition, in the city itself, the Ustaše turned almost every large solid building into a fortification. Strongholds were set up for a circular defense, reinforced with wire barriers. The Ustaše, especially in the second half of October, hastily brought in cement, iron and other materials they used to strengthen existing defenses and build new defensive facilities. On the left bank of the Una, where the center and most of the city are today, lay the center of the Ustaše's defense. There, the Ustaše grouped its forces more heavily and had a larger number of defensive structures. In the city itself the Ustaše kept a reserve on standby to provide assistance to strongholds outside the city, should they be attacked. In addition, they counted on their forces in Bosanska Krupa, Cazin, Slunj and Ličko Petrovo Selo, which could intervene quickly in the event of an attack on Bihać.

== Planning of the operation ==
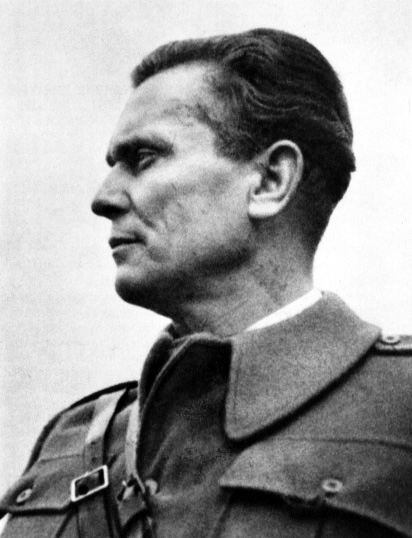
The supreme commander of Yugoslav Partisans, Josip Broz Tito, who played a major role in the planning of the operation, in 1942

On 18 October the supreme commander of Yugoslav Partisans, also known as the National Liberation Army, Josip Broz Tito accepted a suggestion from the Operational Staff for Bosanska Krajina for an attack on Bihać. A day after, the main staff of the National Liberation Army of Bosnia sent a detailed plan to the Supreme Headquarters. Their suggestion was for the operation to take place on 29 October 1942, four days after a detailed plan had been drawn up with the staff of the Lika Brigades.

One Krajina brigade would have the task of capturing Ostrožac, Jezero, Bihać, Spahići, and defending the onslaught of enemy forces from Bosanska Krupa and Cazin towards Bihać. Two Krajina brigades will attack the enemy stronghold of Bihać via Pokoj, Založje, Čekrlija, Golubić. One Krajina and one proletarian brigade will attack Bihać from Golubić, via Dobrenica, Skočaj, Zavalje - Bihać. One Lika brigade should descend through the slopes of Plješivica to the communications Ličko Petrovo Selo - Zavalje, with the direction of the advance towards Ličko Petrovo Selo. The Second Lika Brigade should move from Plitvice Lakes across Prijeboj and attack Ličko Petrovo Selo, and join forces with the First Lika Brigade; after the capture of Petrovo Selo, these brigades would continue to clear enemy villages from Petrovo Selo to Bihać. The Third and Fourth Lika Brigades should put pressure on the enemy strongholds between Kladuša and Petrovo Selo, on Gata, Bugar, and Vrnograč. The Banija forces - no larger than two battalions - would press on Bužim. After the capture of Bihać, the Krajina forces would head in two directions: one towards Cazin, and the other towards Bosanska Krupa with the task of capturing the same strongholds, using panic with the enemy. Lika forces should close the area from Ličko Petrovo Selo to Kladuša in one part, and they should close the second part according to the development of the situation. For the action, they would use 4 howitzers that would directly target the city itself and the enemy strongholds of Zavalje - Žegar, since they are considered to be the strongest enemy strongholds. The howitzers would be deployed at the Grabež position - from Pritočki Grabež to Kućište. From these positions, all enemy strongholds can be directly beaten. Anti-aircraft guns would be assigned to brigade headquarters to liquidate harder strongholds.

— Plan for Bihać Operation by Operational Staff for Bosanska Krajina sent to the Supreme Headquarters Supreme Headquarters (translated to English from Serbo-Croatian)

Tito accepted the plan but postponed the operation for later. On 27 October he made additions and changes to the proposed plan. He also sent orders to move several brigades involved in the operation. On the same day, he discussed the plan for the operation further with the Head of the Main Staff of the National Liberation Army of Bosnia and the leader of the operation, Kosta Nađ. A day later, Tito sent an order detailing how units from Croatia should be used in the operation. Final decisions about which units from Croatia would participate in the operation were also held, as well as the last additions to the overall plan for Bihać.

== The operation ==
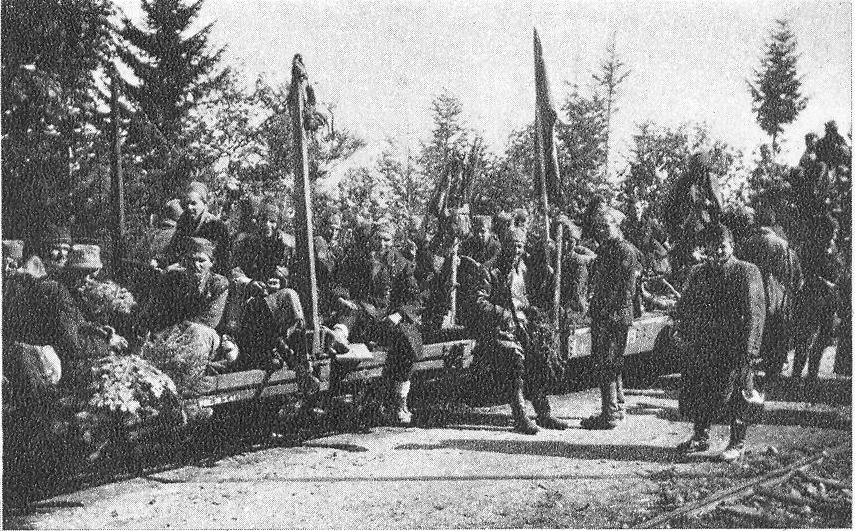
Partisans going to the front by train in November 1942.

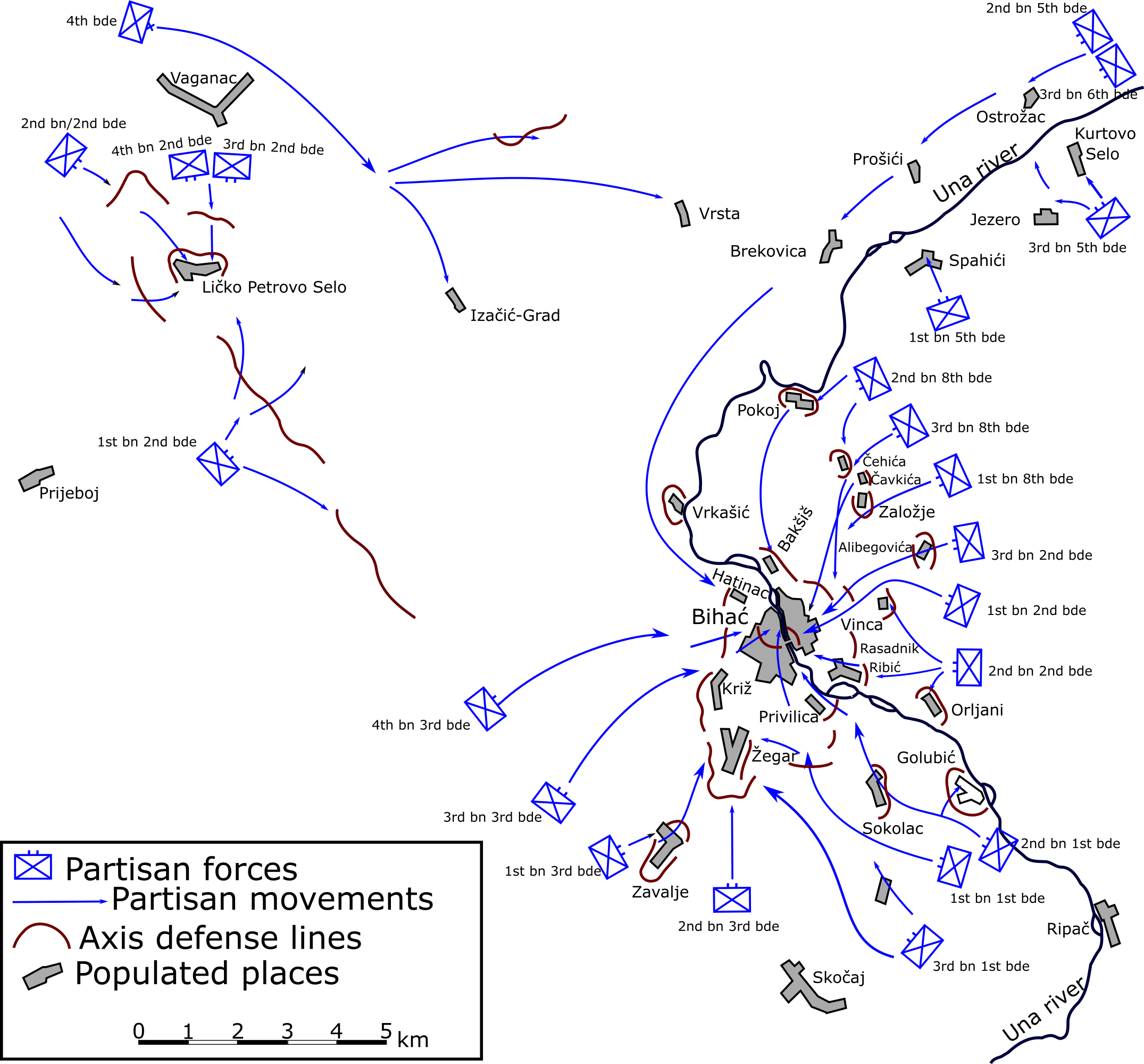
Advance of the Yugoslav Partisan forces during the Battle of Bihać (2 - 4 November 1942)

The movements of Yugoslav Partisan units towards Bihać began on 29 October. As they had to travel a significant distance, they marched during the night, through forests to remain unnoticed. The attack on the city began on 9:30 p.m. on 2 November with the 1st Battalion of the 2nd Krajina Assault Brigade attacking the city itself and the 3rd Battalion of the 8th Banovina Assault Brigade breaching the defenses and quickly advancing towards the railroad station. The battle for the city continued during the night, with Bobmaši groups playing a major role in breaking the bunker defenses of the villages surrounding Bihać. By the morning of 3 November, the Ustaše lost control of all of the city on the west side of the Una except for the important bridgehead on the river which was captured in the afternoon hours of 3 November. During the fighting for the bridgehead, Mile Tubić, the deputy of the 1st Battalion of the 1st Krajina Assault Brigade was killed. He was posthumously awarded the Order of the People's Hero. Around 4:00 p.m. on 4 November, Bihać and all of the villages surrounding it were captured by the partisans and 700 Ustaše fighters escaped from the city. Tito praised all the brigades that fought in the battle, he also specifically praised Ranko Šipka who commanded the 2nd Krajina Assault Brigade.

After capturing the city, all of the brigades were given new orders to secure areas around the city. The 3rd Krajina Assault Brigade and the 1st Krajina Assault Brigade remained in the city to defend it in case of an attack. The 2nd Krajina Assault Brigade was headed towards Bosanska Krupa. Ustaše forces there decided to abandon the city when they heard of this and evacuated to Bosanski Novi. The 4th Kordun Assault Brigade, the 8th Banovina Assault Brigade and the 3rd Battalion of 6th Krajina Assault Brigade advanced towards Cazin and Velika Kladuša. The 2nd Lika Assault Brigade was joined by 1st Lika Assault Brigade, and they headed by the route from Ličko Petrovo Selo to Slunj. The 5th Krajina Assault Brigade was sent to Sanski Most to help the 6th Krajina Assault Brigade defend the territory under Partisan control.

The operation concluded on 15 November and resulted in the Partisans capturing Bosanska Krupa, Otok, Cazin, Bužim, Slunj, Cetingrad, Velika Kladuša, Vrnograč and many other smaller towns. During the operation 860 Ustaše fighters and members of the Croatian home guard were arrested, and 650 Axis soldiers were killed. Partisans seized four Howitzers, three anti-tank artillery pieces, one mountain gun, two mortars, 1000 rifles, over one million rounds of ammunition, and other supplies such as food and clothes.

== Aftermath ==
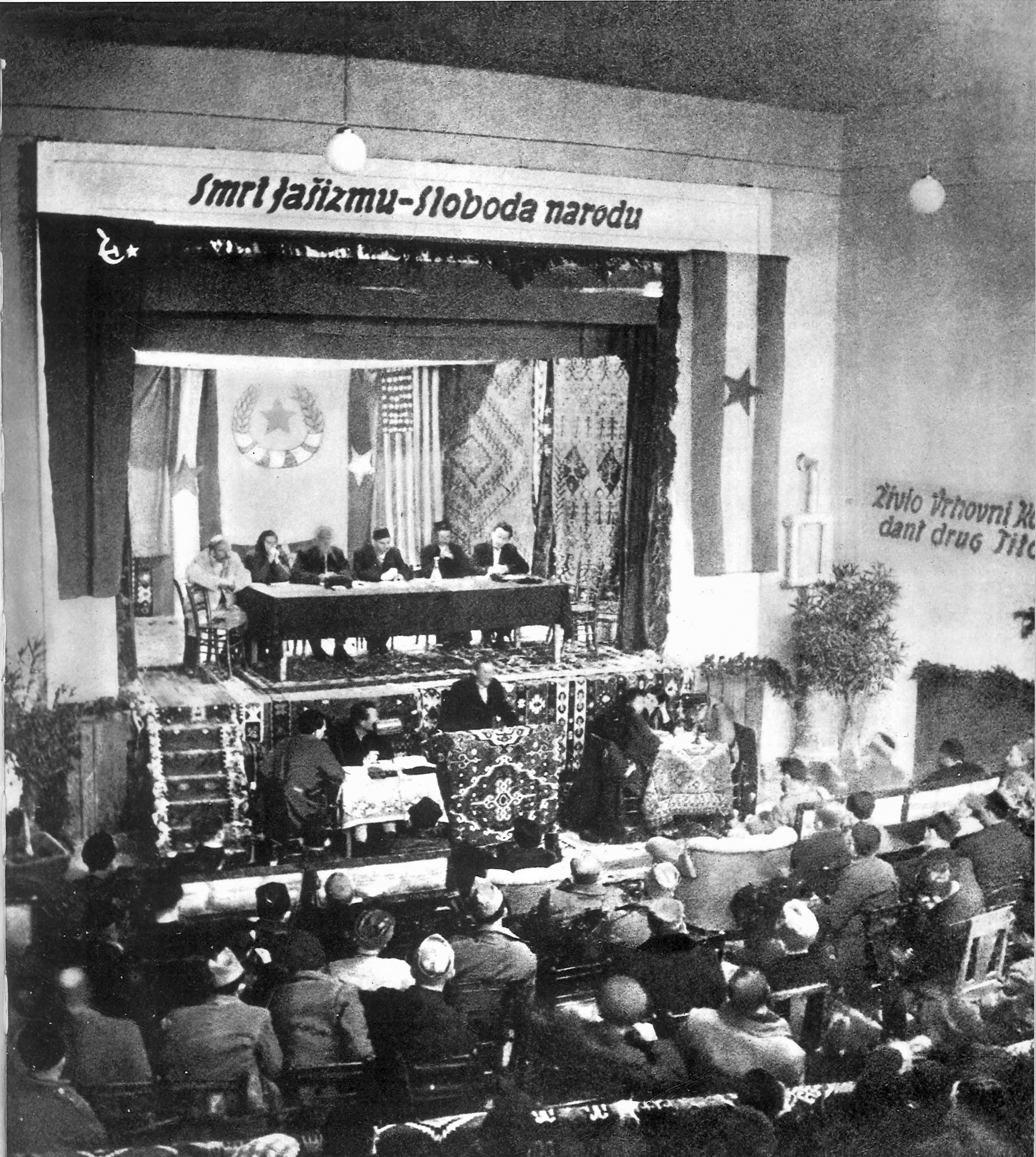
First session of the AVNOJ in Bihać

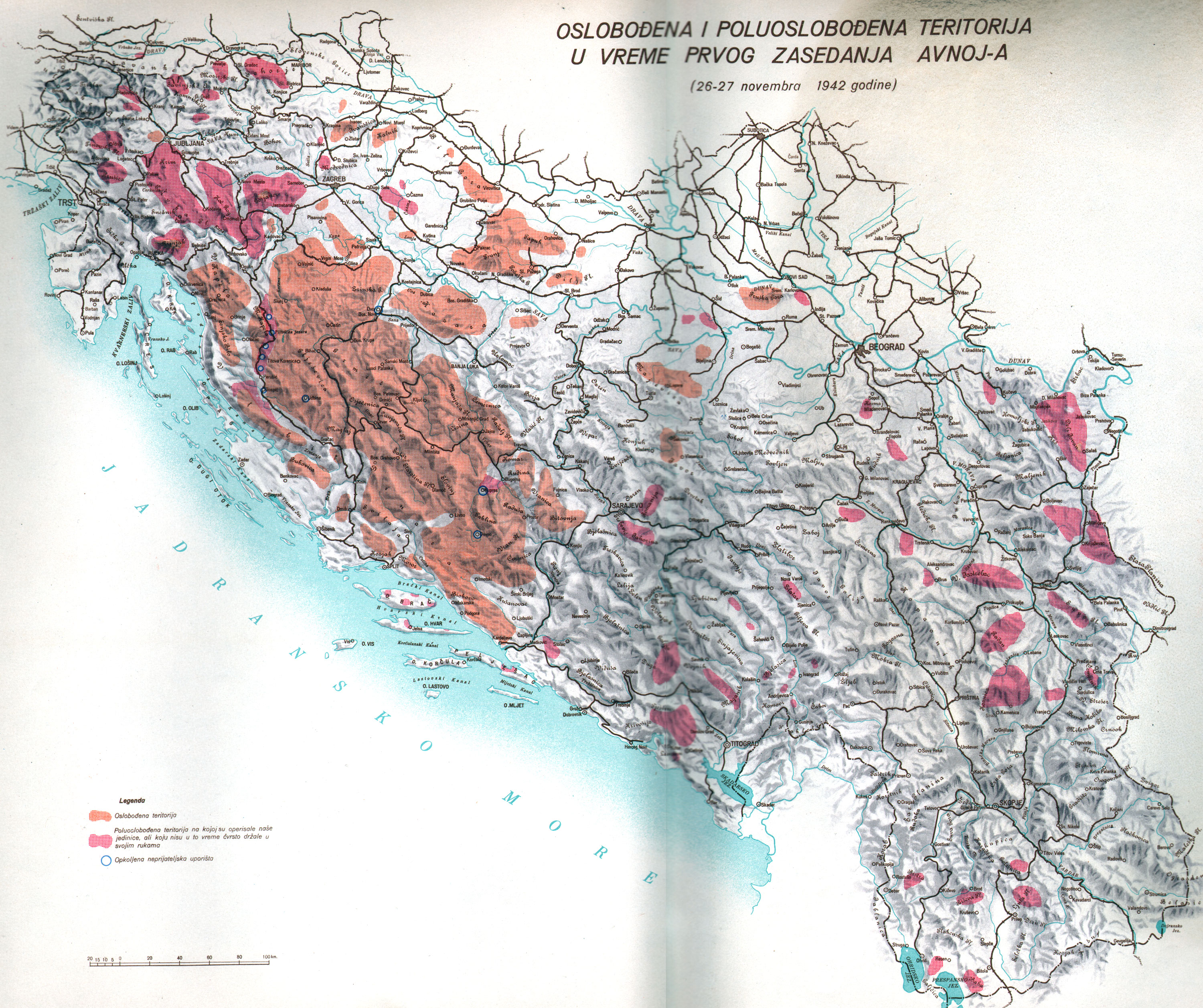
Territory held by Partisans during the first session of AVNOJ

On 4 October, after Partisans captured Bihać, the so-called Bihać Republic was proclaimed consisting of all of the Partisan-held territories in the NDH.

The Anti-Fascist Council for the National Liberation of Yugoslavia was formed on 26 November in Bihać and its first session was held there. During this session, the AVNOJ adopted the principle of a multi-ethnic federal state as the basis for the country's future government and appointed an executive council.

United alliance of anti-fascist youth of Yugoslavia was also formed in Bihać and consisted of all of the anti-fascist youth movements in Yugoslavia. The first session of its congress was held in the city between 27 and 29 December, this session was opened by Tito. It involved delegates from all Yugoslav countries except for Slovenia and Macedonia. The Slovenian delegates were stopped by an Axis offensive; the Macedonian delegates did not attend because of the difficulty of such travel.

After the operation, Bihać became both the military and political center of the resistance by the Yugoslav Partisans.

Bihać was re-captured by the Axis on 29 October 1943, during the Fourth Enemy Offensive. It remained in Axis control until 26 March 1945, when, after the Battle of Bihać, it was again captured by the Partisans.
