= Operation Weiss =

1943 Axis offensive in Yugoslavia

Coordinates: 43.6542°N 17.7625°E

- Part of World War II in Yugoslavia
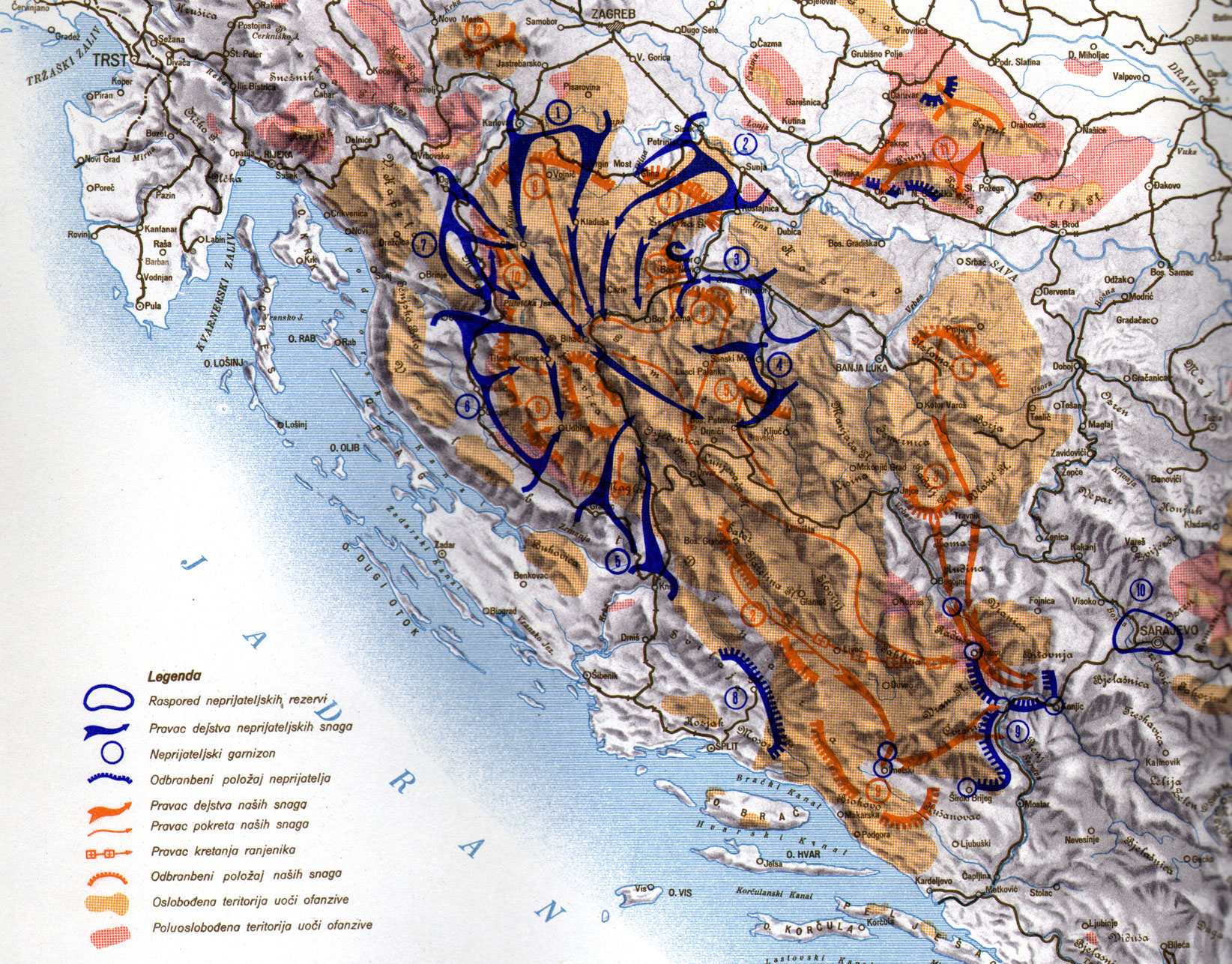
Date	20 January – March 1943
Location	West Bosnia, and then vicinity of the Neretva river, Herzegovina, occupied Yugoslavia
Result	Partisan retreat with heavy losses, Chetnik defeat, Axis failure to achieve strategic goals

Belligerents
Germany; Italy; Croatia; Chetniks (MVAC)	Yugoslav Partisans

Commanders and leaders
(Nazi Germany) Alexander Löhr; (Nazi Germany) Rudolf Lüters; (Fascist Italy) Mario Roatta; (Chetniks) Draža Mihailović; (Chetniks) Zaharije Ostojić; (Chetniks) Dobroslav Jevđević; (Chetniks) Pavle Đurišić; (Chetniks) Vojislav Lukačević	(Yugoslav Partisans) Josip Broz Tito (Yugoslav Partisans) Arso Jovanović (Yugoslav Partisans) Velimir Terzić (Yugoslav Partisans) Koča Popović (Yugoslav Partisans) Peko Dapčević (Yugoslav Partisans) Pero Ćetković † (Yugoslav Partisans) Vicko Krstulović

Strength
90,000 Germans, Italians, NDH troops 12 air squadrons 12,000–15,000 Chetniks	Unknown (about 20,000 men)

Casualties and losses
(Nazi Germany) 514–583 killed 1,214–1,642 wounded 145–158 missing (Fascist Italy) 1,605 killed 983 captured (Independent State of Croatia) 126 killed 258 wounded 218 missing 2,000–3,000 killed or wounded Total: 7,000–8,600	11,915–12,000 killed, 616 executed 2,099–2,506 captured (German claim); 10,000 killed, wounded and missing and 2,000 captured (Yugoslav claim)
- 3,370 civilians killed 1,722 civilians deported to concentration camps

Operation Weiss (German: Unternehmen Weiß), also known as the Fourth Enemy Offensive (Serbo-Croatian: Četvrta neprijateljska ofenziva/ofanziva), was a major Axis offensive launched against the Yugoslav Partisans throughout occupied Yugoslavia during World War II. It was one of the most significant confrontations of World War II in Yugoslavia. The offensive took place in early 1943, between 20 January and mid-to-late March. The Axis operation prompted the Partisan Supreme Command to enact its plans to drive toward eastern Herzegovina, Sandžak and Montenegro.

In order to do this, Tito formed the so-called Main Operational Group, which eventually succeeded in forcing its way across the Neretva in mid-March 1943, after a series of battles with various hostile formations. Other Partisan formations, the 1st Croatian and 1st Bosnian Corps, managed to evade Axis blows and, despite significant losses, reclaim most of the territory they had held before the beginning of the operation. Since its final stage took place on the Neretva River, the operation was known in Yugoslavia as the Battle of the Neretva (Bitka na Neretvi). This stage is also known as the Battle for the Wounded (Bitka za ranjenike).

== Background ==
In late 1942, with the Axis situation in North Africa deteriorating, the German high command became concerned about the possibility of an Allied landing in the Balkans. In such an event, resistance forces in Yugoslavia would be likely to interfere with German defensive operations as well as their economic exploitation of natural resources, including timber, copper and bauxite. As a result, on 16 December 1942 Adolf Hitler ordered the Armed Forces Commander in Southeast Europe, Generaloberst Alexander Löhr, to crush the resistance in Yugoslavia. In a meeting of 18–19 December, the General Staff of the Wehrmacht decided on the destruction of the Bihać Republic. On 8 January Löhr and Mario Roatta, commander of the 2nd Italian Army, met in Zagreb and devised a detailed plan.

== Operation ==
The operation was planned to be carried out in three stages:

- Weiss 1 aimed at destroying Partisan-held areas Lika, Kordun, Banija, Cazinska Krajina and Grmeč. It started on 20 January 1943 and lasted until 25 February.
- Weiss 2 focused on Partisans in the southeast of the Bihać Republic: Drvar, Glamoč, Livno, Jajce and Ključ.
- Weiss 3 was meant to be executed in eastern Herzegovina and Montenegro, targeting mostly the Royalist Chetniks. This phase was cancelled in early February 1943.

The Germans aimed to destroy the central command of the Partisan movement, the Central Committee of the Communist Party of Yugoslavia as well as the bulk of the Partisan units around the Supreme Headquarters. The Axis mustered ten divisions equaling 90,000 troops and 12 air squadrons.

Chetnik auxiliaries and units consisting of between 12,000 and 15,000 men also took part and worked closely with the Italians. The operation coincided with the so-called "March on Bosnia", a plan that called for the use of Chetniks from Lika, northern Bosnia, northern Dalmatia, Herzegovina and Montenegro in order to destroy the Partisan-held territory there. The "March on Bosnia" also called for the ethnic cleansing of the Muslim population in Bosnia and Herzegovina and in Sandžak. According to the Germans, the Chetniks forces comprised 150,000 men in February 1943 (up from 100,000 in August 1942). The Partisans, on the other hand, numbered less than a third of that figure. On 2 January Draža Mihailović reported his plan to the Chetniks for the destruction of the Partisans' Bihać Republic in order to "liberate this Serb territory from Communist terror". On the 21st he wrote: "Indeed, the question of Bosnia is most important. In western Bosnia and Lika we are currently making the final preparations for the definitive destruction of the Communists, who are preventing us from destroying Pavelić's Croatia"."

The orders for the operation called for extreme severity towards captured Partisans and the civilian population. The former were to be shot after capture, and civilian populations deemed hostile were to be deported to transit camps. Villages in the combat area were to be razed to the ground. The commanders on the ground were prohibited from punishing their subordinates for excessive harshness.

=== Weiss 1 ===
According to the plan, four German divisions (7th SS Volunteer Mountain, 369th, 714th and 717th) were to attack from the arc stretching from Karlovac across Glina, Kostajnica, Bosanski Novi and Sanski Most towards the line Bihać--Petrovac. Three Italian divisions ("Lombardia", "Re" and "Sassari") were to advance on their right wing, through Lika and northern Dalmatia. According to the plan, the 7th SS and 717th Divisions, deployed on the extreme ends of the arc, were to race into the enemy rear with motorized battle groups and meet at Vrtoče on the second day of the operation. The reinforced 369th and 714th Division were to meet them and close the circle around the bulk of the Partisan forces in the area of the Grmeč mountain. In the final stage, three divisions were supposed to destroy the encircled Partisans, and to deport the population to prevent the possibility of the revival of guerrilla activity in the area.

German divisions were reinforced with the 202nd Tank Battalion and 2nd and 3rd Home Guard Mountain Brigade. Italian divisions used the Lika, Dalmatia and Herzegovina Chetnik auxiliaries, three Ustasha (31st, 32nd and 34th) and one (2nd Jäger) Home Guard battalions. On 8 January the 2nd and 5th Krajina Brigades moved to Kozara and launched a series of attacks on the NDH garrisons and posts in Lijevče polje. Since these activities coincided with the attacks of the 1st Proletarian Division in central Bosnia, Gen. Lüters decided to redeploy the 714th division to the defense of the Banja Luka area. As the 718th Division was already engaged in fighting the Partisans in central and eastern Bosnia, Lüters reinforced the 369th Division with one regimental combat group of the 187th Reserve Division.

==== Partisan defense ====
The attacks from all directions began on 20 January, but none of the divisions succeeded in keeping the original schedule. The Axis forces attacked the territory controlled by the Partisan 1st Croatian and 1st Bosnian Corps—the areas of Banija, Kordun, Lika and western Bosnia. On the Karlovac-Bihać axis, four Partisan brigades were defending against the attack of the 7th SS Division: 4th and 15th Brigades of the 8th Kordun Division and 6th and 14th Littoral-Gorski Kotar Brigades. The 7th Banija Division was successful in containing the advance of the 369th Division from Glina and Kostajnica towards Cazin and Bosanska Krupa. The 6th Lika Division successfully held the line Plitvička Jezera–Gračac against Italian attacks.

The 717th Division encountered difficulties while advancing on Bosanski Petrovac from Sanski Most. The Division launched its attack on 20 January with the 749th Regiment and elements of the 202nd Tank Battalion. Despite air support, it was halted by the 1st Krajina and one battalion of the 7th Krajina Brigade some 10 km south of Sanski Most. The division's 737th Regiment was in reserve, standing ready to exploit a breakthrough, but the 749th Regiment failed to make one. Over the following days both sides stepped up their efforts, building up strength at the key point; the Partisans remained successful in blocking German attacks, while launching fierce night counterattacks. The 717th Division tried a diversionary attack from Sanski Most westwards with the 2nd Mountain Home Guard Brigade. On 25 January this battle group of two Home Guard battalions and one German company was attacked by the 1st Battalion of the 6th and the 3rd Battalion of the 1st Krajina Brigade, and was routed with heavy losses. The Partisans seized weaponry including 40 light and 10 heavy machine guns and four mountain and one anti-tank cannons. Gen. Dippold, commander of the 717th Division, reported to Gen. Lüters that on 26 January the 2nd Home Guard Brigade was completely shattered, and that the remnants of the 2nd and 4th battalions were absorbed into 749th Grenadier Regiment. A more ambitious westward attack was launched on 27 January with the reinforced 737th Regiment, which reached Benakovac before being halted by the 6th Krajina Brigade. In the meantime, the 2nd and 5th Krajina Brigades arrived from Kozara as reinforcements, and the 737th Regiment suddenly found itself in a difficult situation. Seeing no alternative, the regiment set up an all-around defense; it remained cut off and under attack until 3 February.

Simultaneously, the 717th Division resumed the attack on the main enemy forces towards Ključ and Bosanski Petrovac. The attack was scheduled to begin in the early hours of 28 January, but battalions of the 1st Krajina Brigade succeeded in surprising the Germans during the night with a preventive attack at their starting positions, scattering their units. The next day the Germans launched an attack led by tanks with the intention of collecting weapons and stragglers, but Partisan anti-tank fire destroyed the first tank, killing the commander of the 202nd Tank Battalion, Lt. Col. von Geyso.

==== Attack on Grmeč ====
The Partisan defense line, which had withstood most of the German attacks to that point, was finally compromised by the advance of the 7th SS Division. This unit, with the help of two Italian divisions on the right flank, steadily pushed back the four Partisan brigades, capturing Slunj on 24 January and Rakovica on the 27th. As a result, Bihać came under threat and had to be evacuated, and Germans entered it on 29 January without a fight. This turn of events also compromised the position of the 7th Partisan Division in the Banija region. It was ordered to withdraw and occupy a new line in front of the 7th SS Division, covering the Bihać-Petrovac axis. Thousands of refugees left Banija together with the Partisan units, suffering from air attacks, hunger, frost and disease along the way.

The 7th SS Division continued to push towards Petrovac, against Partisan defenses consisting mainly of the 7th Banija Division. It took another ten days to cover those 50 km. The 7th SS Division reached Petrovac on 7 February, and on 9 February finally managed to link up with the 717th Division, thereby fulfilling the task originally scheduled for the second day of the operation. The 369th Division and the 3rd Home Guard Mountain Brigade, facing only Partisan rearguards, reached Bosanska Krupa on 30 January and relieved the encircled 737th Regiment at Benakovac a few days later. The 369th joined with the 7th SS near Bihać on 4 February. With this, the broader area of Grmeč was encircled by three German divisions. On 6 February, after they had received reinforcements, the 369th, 187th and 717th Division started their attack on Grmeč. The 2nd and 5th Krajina Brigades were caught in the encirclement, along with some 15,000 inhabitants. On 10 February the brigades made the decision to break out of the encirclement, and succeeded in opening the way over the Krupa-Sanski Most road toward Potkalinje. The inhabitants followed the brigades, but a large number (up to 2,000) succumbed to the freezing weather. Some 400 remaining civilians were killed by the Germans.

According to a German report from 18 February for Weiss 1, the 7th SS Division suffered losses of 149 dead, 222 wounded and 68 missing, and the 717th Division's casualties were 118 dead, 290 wounded and 20 missing. The same report puts the Partisan losses at 6,561 dead, but adds that only 286 rifles were captured. This drastic imbalance between the figures suggests that those killed were mainly civilians.

=== Partisan Offensive ===
During the first half of 1942 the Partisans were expelled from the eastern parts of Yugoslavia, and the Axis powers largely succeeded in pacifying these areas. The Partisans established a stronghold in the western parts of the country, but returning to the east remained one of their main objectives. Localization of guerrilla activity enabled the Germans to leave the control of pacified areas to second-tier forces, and to concentrate their best units in the endangered areas. The 714th, 717th and 7th SS Divisions (all in west Bosnia in January 1943) were all originally deployed in Serbia. Tito started with the plans for a march to the east in early autumn 1942. The original idea was to start the large movement in the spring, but signs of an imminent Axis offensive in January 1943 made Tito order the commencement of the operation without delay.

The operation was to be carried out in three stages: the first was an advance to Neretva, the second was from Neretva to Drina, and the third from Drina to the river Lim, and further to the south-east. The main intention was to revive Partisan presence and activities in these areas. On 8 February in Tomislavgrad, Tito presented the plan for the first stage in a conference with the staffs of the 1st, 2nd and 3rd Division, and issued the necessary orders and directives.

The execution of the offensive was facilitated by the fact that the main forces Tito was counting on for the operation (the 1st and 2nd Proletarian and 3rd Shock Division) were deployed outside the area affected by the operation Weiss 1. The most distant unit, the 1st Proletarian Division, was ordered to begin preparing for a start-off march in late January. The main Partisan force was divided into three columns:

- Right Column—the (2nd Proletarian Division) was to advance over Imotski, Posušje and Drežnica with the aim of cutting off communications in the Neretva valley, and protecting the right flank of the Partisan main force against the enemy garrison at Mostar.
- Central Column—the (3rd Shock Division) had the most difficult task: to capture Gornji Vakuf, Prozor, Ostrožac on Neretva and Konjic, and to open the way across the Neretva at Konjic.
- Left Column—the (1st Proletarian Division) was ordered to advance over Gornji Vakuf, Solakova Kula, Bradina and Ivan sedlo, protecting the right flank of the Partisan main force against the enemy garrison at Mostar, destroy all traffic installations between Konjic and Sarajevo and provide protection for the Partisan northern flank against possible enemy intervention from Sarajevo by securing the main mountain pass of Ivan Sedlo.

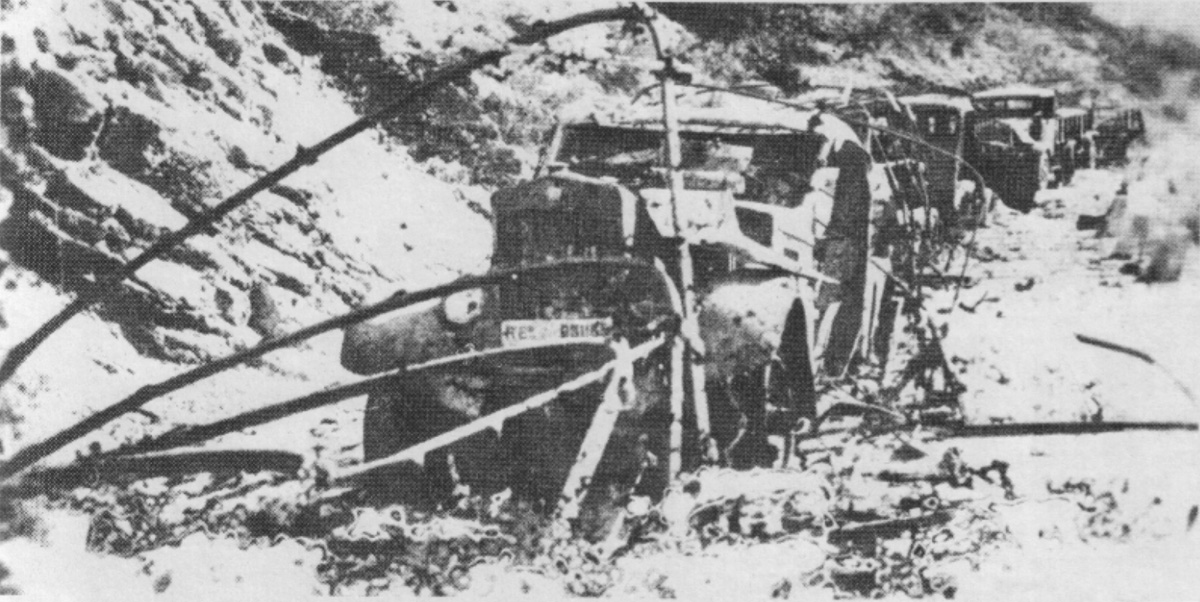
Destroyed Italian column near Drežnica, February 1943.

7th Banija Division was tasked with acting as the group's rearguard and protecting the recently formed "Central Hospital" with some 4,000 sick and wounded. The hospital was created in order to provide protection to the wounded, since they were routinely targeted for execution by the Axis. The existence of the "Central Hospital" had a profound impact on the course and outcome of future operations.

The Right Column (2nd Proletarian Division) started its advance with easy victories over NDH garrisons in Posušje and Imotski on 9 and 10 February. On 15 February it reached Neretva and attacked a small Italian garrison in Drežinca. The 1st Battalion of the 260th Regiment of the Division Murge intervened from Mostar, but was almost completely annihilated (120 dead and 286 captured, including the Commander, Lt. Col. Francesco Metella), on 16 February with the loss of all its equipment. The Partisans sent a messenger to Mostar to propose a prisoner exchange, but the exchange did not happen.

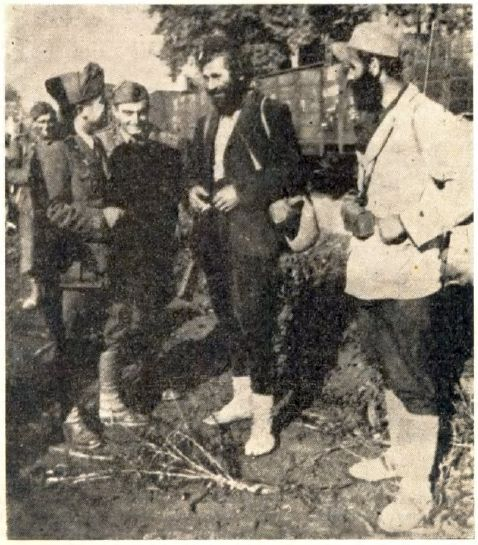
Chetniks with Italians, waiting to be transported by train.

With this success, the 2nd Division wrested control over the Neretva valley north of Mostar from enemy forces, and severed all contact between the city and Italian garrisons to the north. The Italian Command concluded that the Mostar garrison was endangered, and decided to mobilize immediately all available Chetnik units. Originally, the Italians had agreed not to use the Chetniks from Montenegro on the territory of the NDH, but now had to reverse their decision in the face of the looming threat to their interests in Herzegovina. The 2nd Proletarian Division, for its part, felt confident in its new position. As it had fulfilled its main task, the Division sent its 4th Proletarian Brigade to the north in order to assist the Central Column.

In the opening phase the Central Column (3rd Division) captured Gornji Vakuf on 30 January, and by 8 February was making preparations for an attack on the Prozor garrison. Prozor was defended by the 3rd Battalion of the Italian 259th Regiment, reinforced with some infantry and artillery units, along with a company of L3 light tanks. The town was heavily fortified with a large number of stone and concrete bunkers surrounded by wire obstacles and covered by a well-organized fire system. The Partisan attack began on the evening of 15 February, but failed due to the fierce resistance of the garrison.

After receiving reinforcements, the 3rd Division made another attempt and the second attack ultimately succeeded. The Italian garrison was destroyed, with 120 killed and 220 captured. Partisans also captured four 100 mm howitzers, two 47 mm anti-tank guns, nine 81 mm mortars and 12 heavy and 25 light machine-guns. All of the tanks were captured or destroyed: nine of them were captured in the Prozor area, and two were captured later in Ostrožac, and all eleven were used for the formation of the Tank Company of the Supreme Command. The Italian reinforcements sent earlier that day were also destroyed: the 1st Battalion of the 260th Regiment near Drežnica, and a company of 1st Battalion of the 259th Regiment, sent from Konjic, was destroyed near Prozor.

According to the popular myth, on the eve of the attack, a conference in the 3rd Division HQ was interrupted by the arrival of a courier with a note from Tito (who was in nearby Šćit). The note simply read: "Prozor must fall tonight" (Prozor noćas mora pasti). Historical records and participants' memories are divided on the subject, but the phrase became popular, and entered into everyday speech and pop culture.

The offensive continued with the 10th Herzegovina Brigade of the 3rd Partisan Division attacking and routing a company from the 1st Battalion of the 259th Regiment in Rama on 20 February, inflicting losses of 183 killed and 7 captured Italian soldiers. On 22 February, the 5th Proletarian Brigade of the same division captured Ostrožac on Neretva.

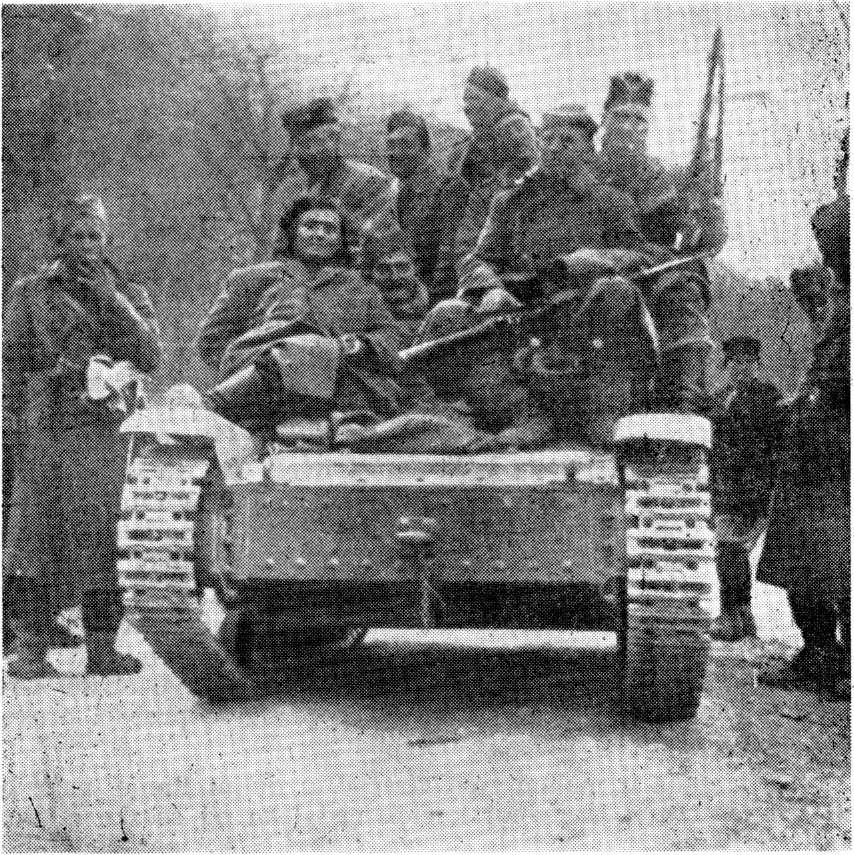
Partisans of the Main Operational Group on the tank captured from the Italians in late February 1943.

In the meantime, the 4th Proletarian Brigade from the Right Column captured a further 270 Italians, 140 of whom were in the town of Jablanica, which was taken on 22 February. Among the captured were Lieutenant Colonel Pelleroni, commander of the Jablanica garrison, and Colonel Malantonio, commander of the 259th Regiment. Colonel Malantonio was shot after the Partisans had determined that he was a prominent member of the Fascist Party, and that he had taken part in the Spanish Civil War as an officer in the Italian Corpo Truppe Volontarie. With the fall of Jablanica, Partisans were in control of the entire Neretva valley between Mostar and Ivan Sedlo; only the strategically important town of Konjic was still in Italian hands.

The Left Column (1st Proletarian Division) was only partially concentrated, but decided to go ahead with the plan using only two of its brigades. The main objectives on the Sarajevo-Konjic section of the Sarajevo-Ploče railway line, Ivan sedlo and Raštelica (area around villages Gornja and Donja Raštelica), were defended by the Ustaša Railroad Battalion, and important railroad objects Bradina, Lukač and Brđani were defended by up to a company strong Italian units in strong fortifications. The 1st Proletarian Brigade captured the important mountain pass Ivan Sedlo and Raštelica station on 17 February by a coup de main. The Italian fortifications were overcome on 18 February, after some artillery and mortar fire exchanges, and after an intervention attempt by an armored train from Konjic had been repulsed. In that situation, with no enemy activity from Sarajevo, the 1st Proletarian Brigade headquarters made a critical error in judgment by sending two battalions to attack the railway station Tarčin near Sarajevo, and the remaining two battalions on a surprise attack attempt on Konjic, thus leaving the most important objective in its area, the Ivan sedlo mountain pass, virtually unoccupied.

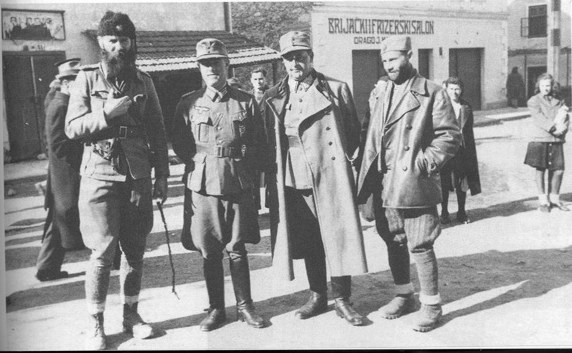
Chetnik officer Lukačević with German soldiers, February 1943

The surprise raid on Konjic was conceived with the intention of exploiting the demoralization among the Italians, and with the hope of establishing contact with the 5th Brigade of the 3rd Division for a joint attack. But, the contact was not established, and in the night on 19/20 February, two battalions of the 1st Proletarian Brigade attacked the main target of the whole Partisan operation, the Konjic garrison, unsupported. The attack had some initial success, and the defenders were thrown back from the right bank of the river. However, since only two partisan companies managed to cross the river and enter the town center, they were easily halted by heavy mortar and artillery fire. Seeing that no progress was being made by dawn, the Brigade Headquarters cancelled the attack.

The other two battalions of the brigade attacked Tarčin on the night 20/21 February. The attack coincided with the arrival of the German reinforcements from Sarajevo. As the Partisans were outnumbered, the Germans succeeded in throwing them back, and resuming their movement towards Ivan sedlo. The appearance of German units in Tarčin marked the beginning of the Weiss Mostar operation.

=== Weiss Mostar ===
By the third week of February the Partisans had managed to breach the Italian blockade along the Neretva River, thus compromising one of the main aspects of the operational plan for Weiss 2. Worst of all, the Partisans captured Posušje and endangered the wider Mostar area, which provided the German war industry with 10 percent of its bauxite ore needs. Since Italian troops were seemingly incapable of containing the situation, the German Command was compelled to adjust the operational plans accordingly. It was decided to deploy 718th Division immediately to the endangered areas, even before Weiss 2 was launched.

The 718th Division started its attack on 19 February, with one column advancing from Bugojno towards Gornji Vakuf and Prozor, and the other from Sarajevo towards Konjic. Jablanica was the ultimate objective of both pincer arms. The column from Bugojno, named "Battle Group Vogel", consisted of the 738th Regiment (minus one battalion), the 5th Ustaša Brigade (the so-called Black Legion) and artillery. It captured Gornji Vakuf on 22 February, and then found itself stuck in a ten-day-long battle against the reinforced 7th Banija Division in front of Prozor.

The column from Sarajevo (named "Battle Group Annacker"), consisted of the 750th Regiment (minus one battalion), two battalions of the 7th Home Guard Regiment, one Ustaša battalion, artillery, and one platoon of tanks. It was this battle group which attacked two battalions of the 1st Proletarian Brigade in Tarčin on 21 February. The group repulsed the Partisan attack on Tarčin, threw back Partisan battalions, and on the same day reached Ivan sedlo and Raštelica. After regrouping, the Partisans reclaimed their positions on the Ivan sedlo on the next day, but a substantial part of the battle group, including one German and one Home Guard battalion, an Ustaša company, and a number of tanks, succeeded in breaking through to Konjic on 22 February. They arrived just in time to decisively strengthen the garrison before a major Partisan attack. The commander of the 1st Proletarian Brigade Danilo Lekić had to answer in person to Tito for the failure of his brigade to seal off the approaches to the lower Neretva Valley.

=== Attack on Konjic ===
The fact that Konjic controlled the only road leading to Eastern Herzegovina (the rest of the eastern bank of Neretva to the south of the town being dominated by the virtually unpassable Prenj mountain), made it the prime objective of the Partisan army. The Konjic garrison originally consisted of the 1st Battalion of the 259th Regiment with artillery elements and other units. During the fighting at Prozor, Rama and Jablanica, parts of the Konjic garrison were sent as reinforcements, and were destroyed. Division Murge, as a whole, in one week suffered losses of some 2,300 men, and was affected by panic and demoralization, and this caused a lot of optimism among Partisans. But, immediately before the main Partisan attack, a two and a half battalion strong vanguard of the Battle Group Annacker entered the town. At the same time, some 3,000 strong Chetnik formation under Lukačević reached the town, and, in agreement with the garrison, assumed positions around the town. This way, it unexpectedly became a very difficult obstacle for the whole Partisan Main Operational Group.

The 3rd Division decided to storm the town by using two of its brigades (the third remained in Prozor), with one (the 5th Montenegro Brigade) attacking along the right bank of the river, and the second (the 10th Herzegovina Brigade) along the left. The hastily organized attack began in the evening of 22 February. Due to insufficient intelligence, the 10th Brigade ran into strong Chetnik resistance on the eastern bank and could barely reach the town before dawn. On the opposite bank, the 5th Brigade faced stiff resistance by German and Italian forces, achieving little success. As a result, the 3rd Division saw no alternative but to cancel the attack by the morning of the 23rd.

For the next attempt, on 24 February in the evening, the attacking forces were reinforced with the 4th Montenegro Brigade from the 2nd Proletarian Division, and the Tank Company of the Supreme Headquarters. The attack went on through the night, and resumed the next night, but to no avail. In a report, Germans praised the "help of the brave Chetniks".

As the blockade of the Ivan Sedlo Pass by the 1st Proletarian Division seemed to be holding, and no further parts of the battle group Annaker reached Konjic, Tito decided to send another brigade. Early on 26 February, the 3rd Krajina Brigade left its positions around Prozor, and started the march to the embattled town. However, after only a few hours, it was summoned back. The appearance of the 717th Infantry Division (now attacking Prozor instead of Livno, as originally envisaged by the plan for Weiss 2) on the flank of battle group Vogel endangered the whole western front of the NOVJ; the Central Hospital at Šćit was now directly exposed to the German onslaught. Consequently, the attack on Konjic, using additional forces from the Prozor area, had to be cancelled.

At this stage, Tito and his HQ had suddenly found themselves facing an entirely different situation from the one they faced only days earlier. By 20 February, the prospects looked good for the "Main Operational Group": all but one Italian garrison in the Neretva Valley were destroyed and the road to Eastern Herzegovina looked open. Now, the road was blocked by unexpectedly strong resistance in Konjic, and the Partisan army was hemmed in the narrow Neretva valley surrounded on all sides by strong enemy forces: On 25 February the Germans launched Weiss 2, attacking Drvar, Glamoč and Livno with two divisions; the Italians in Mostar regrouped, and fielded two battle groups with Chetnik support up the river; further strong Chetnik concentrations were detected on the eastern bank of the Neretva. Consequently, the plans had to be revised, and tough decisions had to be made.

=== Weiss 2 ===
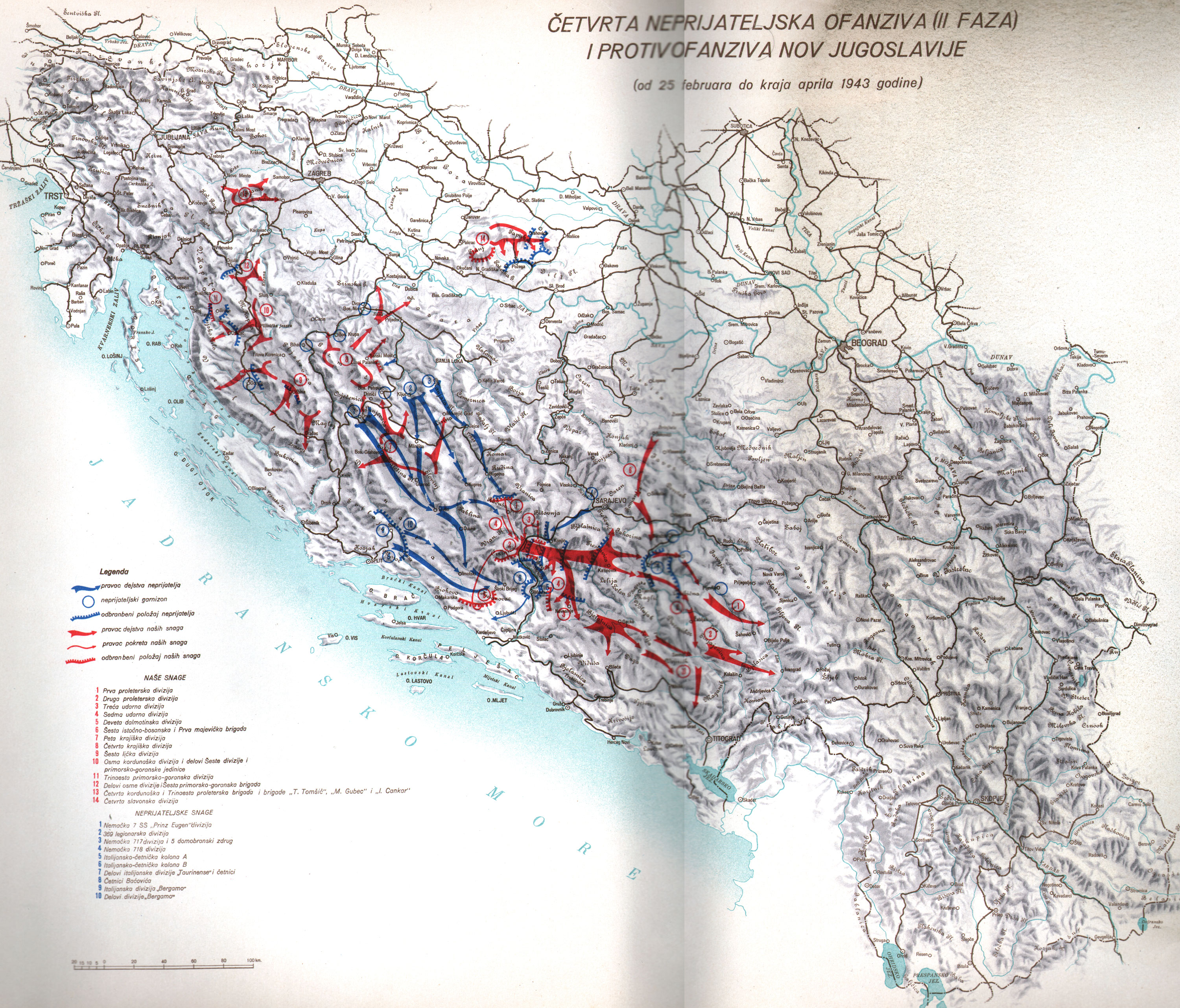
Second stage, German operations Weiss Mostar and Weiss 2, and Partisan drive over Neretva.

Based on the gathered intelligence, German command concluded that Livno was the center of the southeastern half of the Partisan territory. For that reason, Weiss 2 had been conceived as a concentric attack on Livno, with the assumption that the Partisans would be pushed back, encircled, and destroyed there. In the meantime, the situation had changed. The Partisans broke into the Neretva valley, and their main concentration was now between Prozor and Konjic. In spite of this, German command largely proceeded with the original plan. In light of the recent developments, however, first one (718th) and, after a week, another (717th) division were directed towards the new flashpoint.

Two divisions, the 7th SS and the 369th, were used for the Weiss 2 operation. Their advance commenced on 25 February. The route assigned to the 7th SS Division was from Bosanski Petrovac, over Drvar and Bosansko Grahovo to Livno, while the 369th Division had to cover the route from Mrkonjić-Grad over Mliništa and Glamoč to Livno. In front of them stood six (out of ten) brigades of the Partisan 1st Bosnian Corps. The plan of the Corps Headquarters did not call for decisive defense. The units would put up just enough resistance to allow the units and the population to be evacuated, and would thereafter merely evade the German advancing columns. The 7th SS division captured Drvar on 28 February, and continued towards Grahovo, pushing back the 8th, 9th and 10th Krajina Brigades. On the road to Glamoč, the 4th and 7th Krajina Brigades were slowing down the 369th Division. As the 7th SS Division reached Grahovo, and the 369th, Glamoč, on 2 March, the Corps Headquarters decided to perform the evasion maneuver, and the brigades, together with a mass of the refugees, commenced their march over Šator Mountain towards Rore, and back to the Krajina. The freezing weather and deep snow meant this march over the high mountain area cost many civilian lives. The Germans invested large efforts in pursuing the Partisans through the mountain, but the Partisans remained elusive, and the only result was the capture of a number of exhausted refugees.

After this maneuver, all the units of the 1st Bosnia Corps found themselves out of reach of the advancing Germans, except the 7th and 9th Krajina Brigades. They were temporarily subordinated directly to the Supreme HQ which had ordered them to slow down the German advance towards Neretva. On 5 March, the two German divisions had finally reached Livno and taken it without a fight. After several days of rest, the 7th SS Division resumed its movements to the Mostar bauxite area without Partisan interference, and the 369th Division headed towards Jablanica.

Further to the south, the group of Herzegovina Chetnik units under Baćović was marching from Split towards Neretva. This group had been transported by the Italians by sea and land to Knin in December 1942 in order to fight the Partisans in Lika. In early February 1943, the group was first returned to Split and was then ordered to make an overland march to Neretva. While passing through the Biokovo hinterland, the group committed numerous crimes against the civilian population. Around Vrgorac, the group encountered the elements of the 9th Partisan (Dalmatian) Division. The division, deployed in the broader area of Imotski, was already under pressure from the east (Italian regimental battle group "Scotti" from Mostar) and the south-east (Montenegro Chetniks under Vesković from Ljubuški). Facing such odds, the division had to retreat towards Jablanica, where it became a part of the Main Operational Group.

=== Battle of Neretva ===
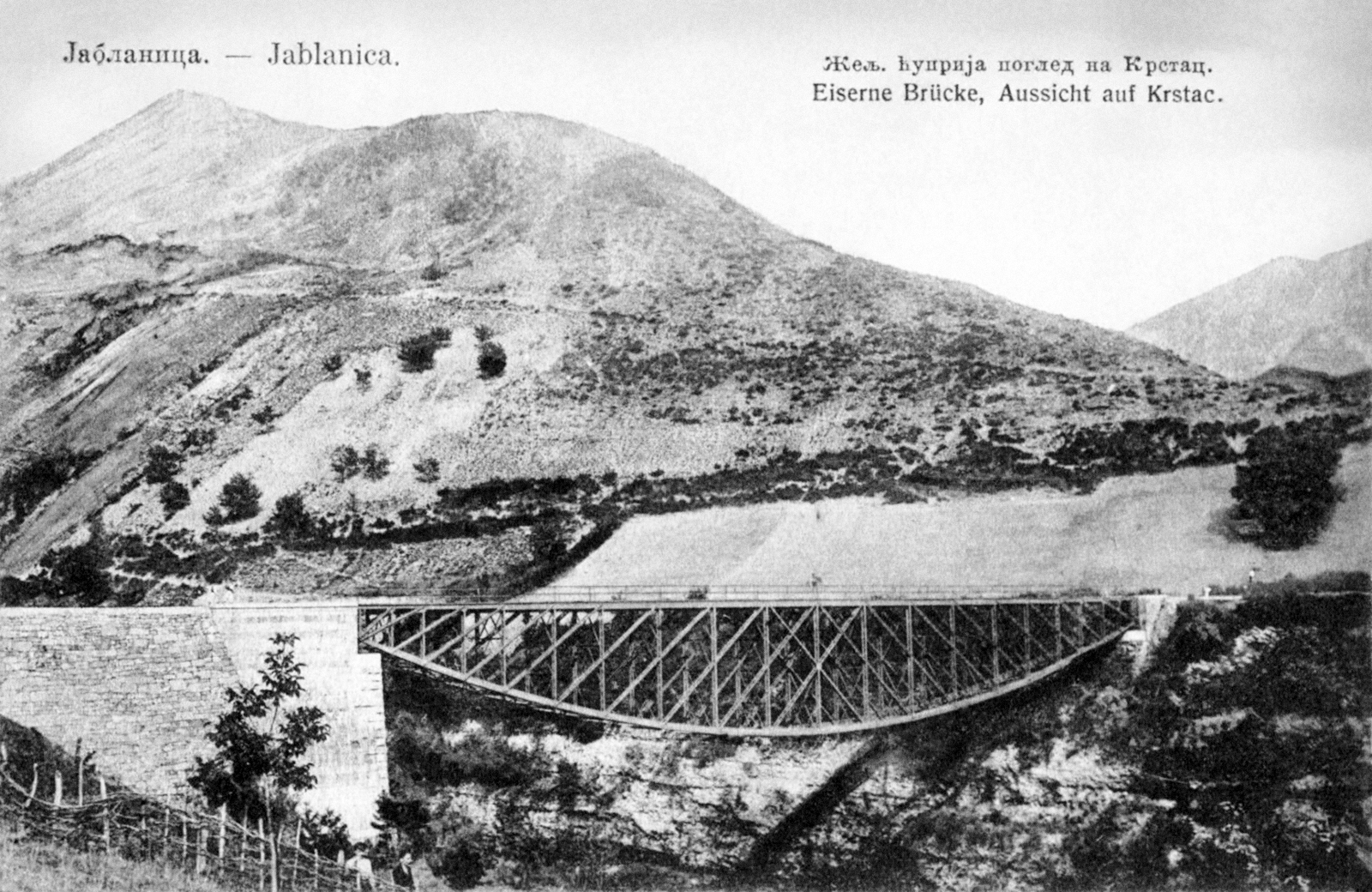
Famous bridge's original structure before it was blown up by Partisans.

In the last days of February, Tito's Main Operational Group found itself in a critical position with no open road remaining. On the one side it was stuck in front of the stubborn defense of the Konjic garrison, and on the other, it was exposed to the mounting pressure on Prozor. There was also constant pressure from the reinforced parts of the 718th division from Sarajevo, increasing pressure of the Italian-Chetnik battlegroups from Mostar, build-up of further Chetnik forces on the eastern bank of Neretva, and a further two German divisions (7th SS and 369th) were approaching from the west. Alarming news about the imminent threat to the Central Hospital was arriving in Tito's HQ on a daily basis.

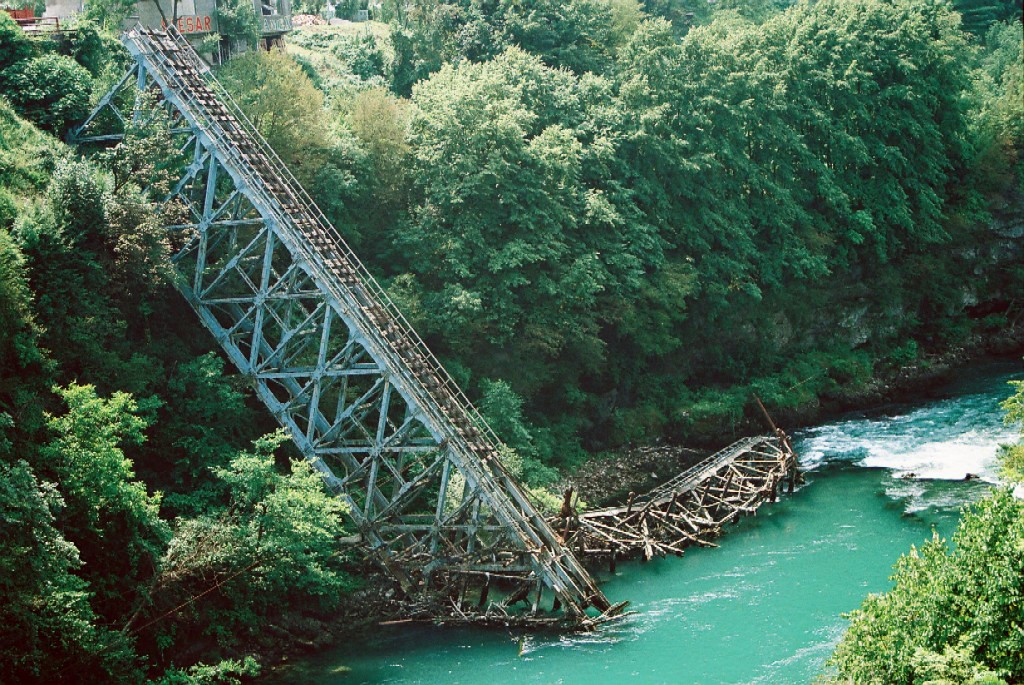
Destroyed bridge, today a part of the memorial complex, with its structure altered for the purpose of & during film production.

In that situation, Tito took the tactical command firmly in his hands. On 28 February he decided to reverse the direction of the attack, and, instead of pushing over Neretva, decided to strike hard at the Germans pressuring Prozor. According to this new direction, he ordered the Pioneer Company to destroy all the bridges across the Neretva, which was done between 1 and 4 March. He also ordered all the forces to concentrate attacks against Gornji Vakuf, with only necessary rearguards left on the Neretva.

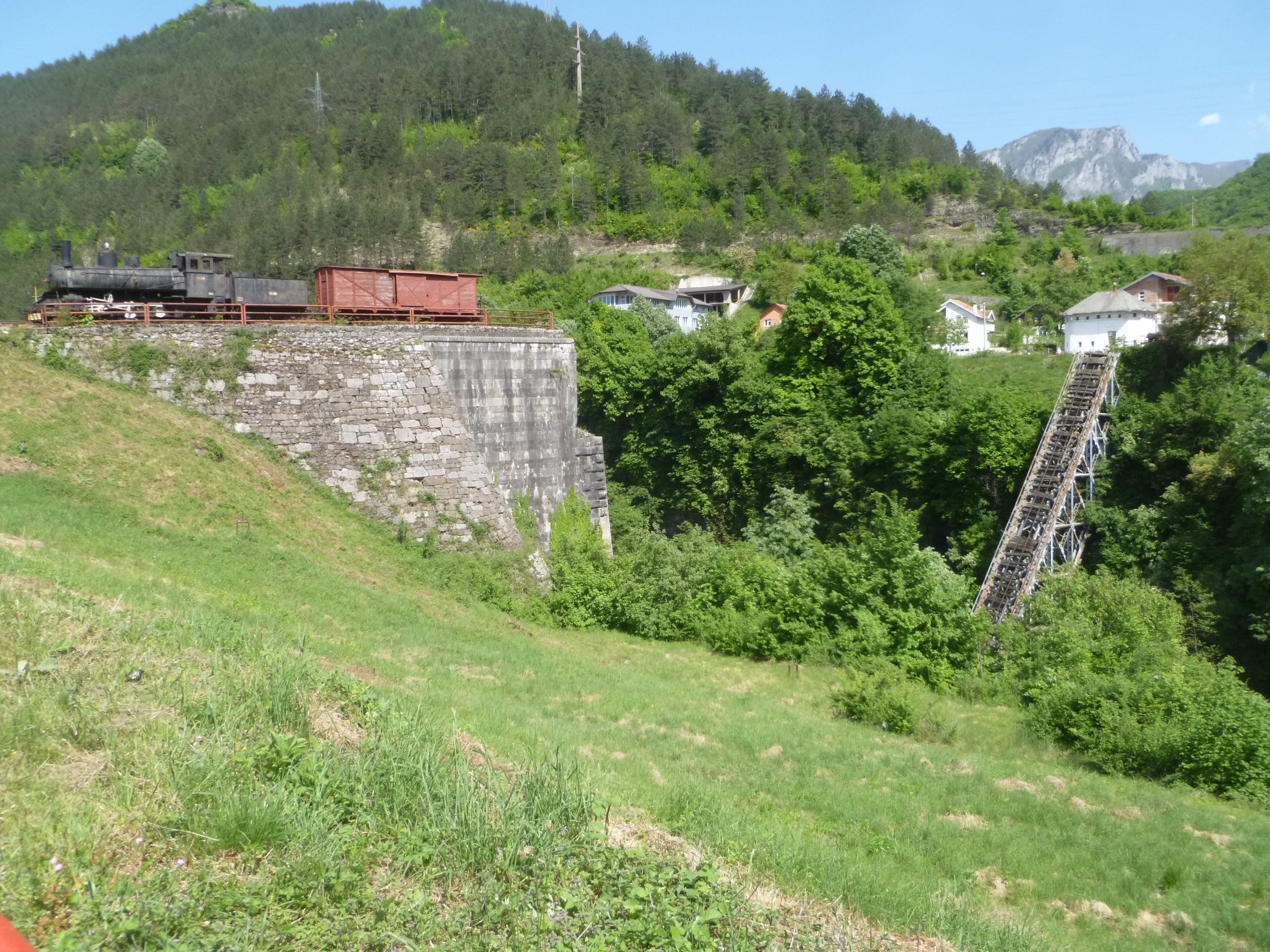
Memorial complex today, bridge on the Neretva was twice-built and twice-destroyed during the shooting of the film Battle of Neretva, hence the structural deviation from the original.

==== Counterattack at Gornji Vakuf ====
The counterattack began not a minute too soon. The 717th Division and the battlegroup Vogel were attacking along the Gornji Vakuf – Prozor road with the main column, while trying to circumvent the partisan defense with flanking columns over Pidriš and Vilića gumno, intending to capture the important pass at Makljen. On 2 March at dawn, the 4th Proletarian Brigade, led by its 2nd Battalion, bypassing the columns of the wounded from the Central Hospital, reached Vilića gumno, and assumed positions in the deep snow, 30 to 50 meters from German lines, to be attacked almost immediately by the German 749th Regiment. After several hours of defense, the Brigade charged the enemy positions and pushed the Germans back down the slopes of the Raduša mountain. The fighting was intense and dramatic, under difficult circumstances, and the losses were serious. The report for that day counted 51 killed, 83 wounded, 21 missing and 31 cases of frostbite. On the other side, 3rd Company of the 2nd Battalion fell down to only 8 men. For this success, the 2nd Battalion and its commander Niko Strugar were officially commended by Tito.

During 2 and 3 March, brigades were arriving in Prozor and assuming their positions along the line of fire. On 4 March, a full-scale Partisan counterattack was launched with all nine brigades. Five brigades were attacking German positions frontally, and the remaining four were trying to circumvent the flanks. The Germans were pushed back all the way to near Bugojno, and they remained there waiting and preparing for defense until 8 March. In the fight on 4 March the 2nd Proletarian Brigade captured Major Strecker, Commander of the 3rd Battalion of the 738th Regiment, and in the following days used him to propose a prisoner exchange and talks on some other subjects to the Germans. This led to the famous March negotiations.

==== Forcing the way over Neretva ====
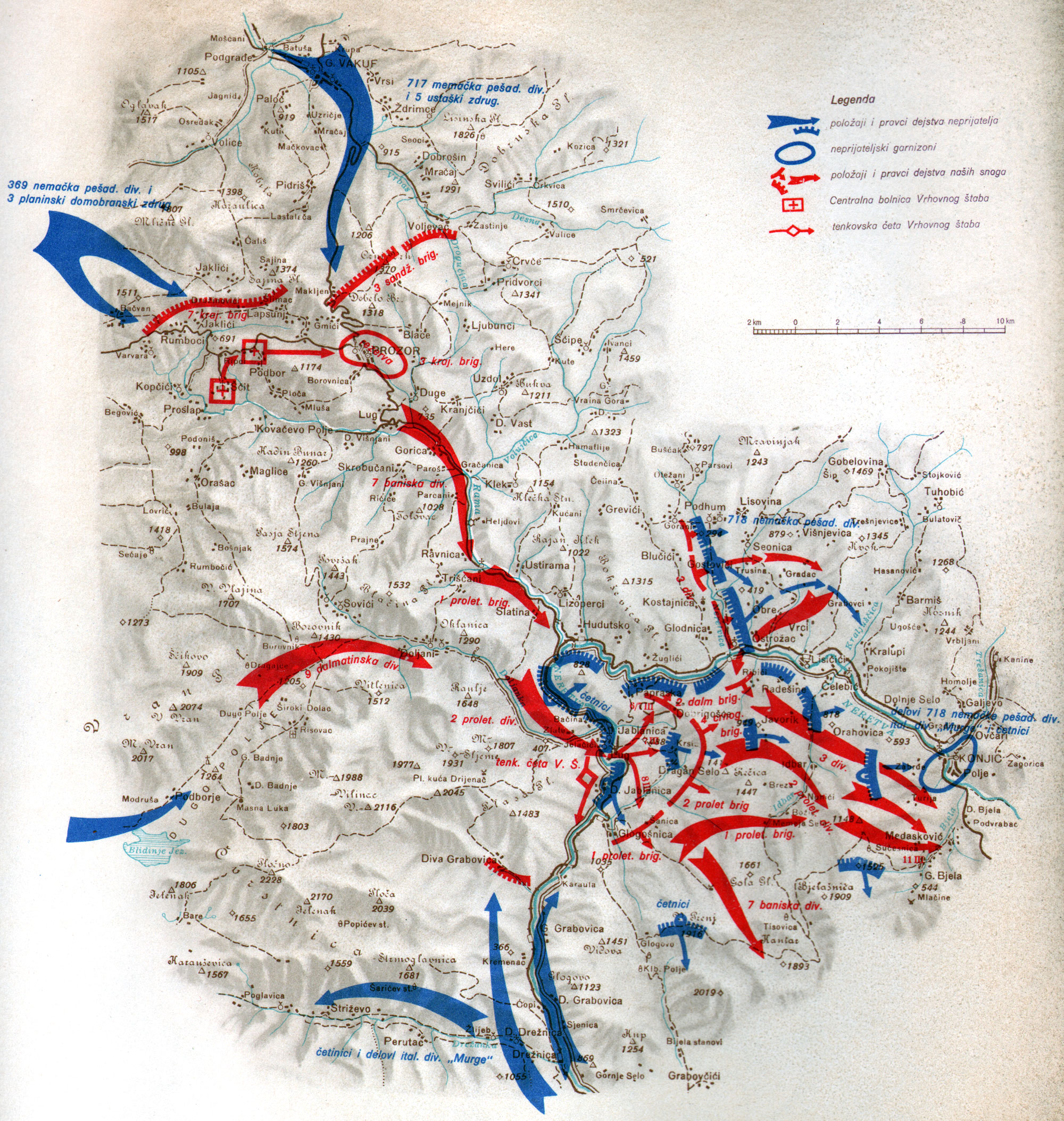
Final Partisan push over Neretva.

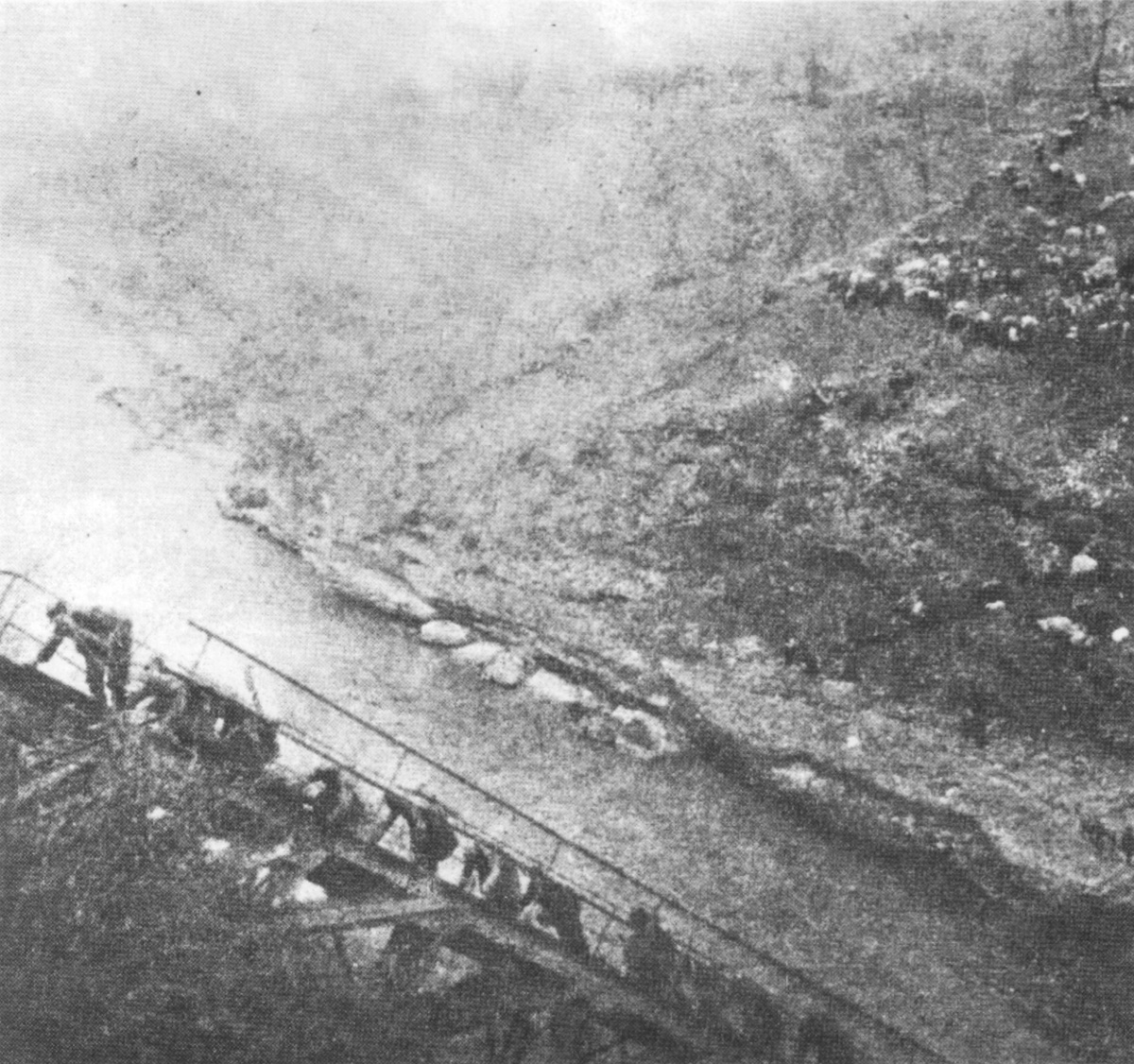
Partisans crossing the Neretva river over the construction of the broken bridge at Jablanica.

The German Command was confused and worried by the successful Partisan attack at Gornji Vakuf. On the assumption that the Partisans would continue their advance towards Bugojno, General Lüters ordered the 369th Division to the area on 6 March, noting in the War diary that "the key error (was) G.Vakuf". However, Tito was not pleased with the prospects of the advance/retreat to the Vrbas valley, fearing the Partisans would thus merely exchange one cauldron for another. In light of these considerations, and much to the surprise of his closest associates, Tito ordered a 180-degree turn and re-directed the bulk of his army back to the Neretva.

The key role in forcing the way over Neretva was assigned to the 2nd Dalmatian Brigade. During the Gornji Vakuf counterattack preparations, the brigade was left on the Neretva as a rearguard. After the counter-attack had been launched, the brigade commander Ljubo Vučković did not consider the possibility of return to the river, and consequently ordered the evacuation of Jablanica, deploying his unit on the hills outside the town. However, on March 4, Tito summoned him to a meeting, criticized him for leaving Jablanica, and ordered him to reoccupy the town immediately. Furthermore, Vučković was instructed to cross the Neretva with his unit the following night, clear the Chetniks from the eastern bank, and secure a bridgehead.

The reoccupation of Jablanica turned out to be easier than previously thought. As the Tank Company of the Supreme HQ was available, it was ordered to spearhead the attack. The town was held by two battalions of the Durmitor Chetnik Brigade. After seeing tanks, the Chetniks assumed that it was the Italian relief column, and moved out to meet them. The Partisans took advantage of the Chetnik confusion and opened fire, causing them to panic and run away. The 2nd Dalmatian Brigade spent the whole day considering various options for crossing the river. Since the pioneer detachment did not come until late in the evening, Vučković informed the Supreme Command that it would be impossible to cross the Neretva during the same night. On the following day, 6 March, the brigade was reinforced by the 2nd Proletarian Brigade. Under the cover of darkness, one group of 12 men from the 2nd Company of the 3rd Battalion of the 2nd Dalmatian crossed the skeleton of the railway bridge and began climbing up the steep eastern bank. The Chetniks occupying the bunker above the bridge sensed something was afoot and began firing blindly, killing two soldiers. The remaining ten men succeeded in reaching the top of the cliff and destroying the bunker with hand grenades. Once this obstacle was out of the way, the rest of the battalion followed, and after it two battalions from the 2nd Proletarian Brigade. On the following day, these three battalions scattered the Chetnik Durmitor Brigade, causing its soldiers to flee deep to the rear where they spread panic among other Chetnik units. With this success, the bridgehead was secured, and the pioneers started their work on the construction of the new improvised bridge, resting on the skeleton of the old one.

Tito's new plan was to push the Germans back from Prozor to gain some space and breathing room, and then to cross the Neretva at Jablanica as fast as possible. The renewal of attacks on Konjic was not envisaged. Instead of using the road running through Konjic, the bulk of the Main Operational Group, with the Central Hospital and other non-combat units, was to cross the Prenj Mountain range just across the river between Jablanica and Konjic. As it was impossible to take along the tanks, trucks, and heavy artillery, these were simply dumped into the river. One of the necessary preconditions for this maneuver was the tight blockade of the town. After the 1st Proletarian Brigade had left the Ivan Sedlo Pass to participate in the Gornji Vakuf counterattack, the bulk of the 718th Division, together with its headquarters, reinforced the garrison at Konjic. These forces were exerting pressure on the Partisan rearguards throughout the first days of March, and ultimately succeeded in pushing them back across Neretvica, some 10 km to the west of the town. On 5 March, the commander of the 3rd Partisan Division, Pero Ćetković, received an order to push the Germans back to the town, and seal-off the garrison for good. In fighting from 5 to 9 March, the Partisans reclaimed Ostrožac and other positions on Neretva, throwing the Germans back to their original positions.

The final push over Neretva was to be carried out in the following fashion:

- 3rd Division on the left flank, with the task of blockading Konjic.
- 2nd Division reinforced with the 1st Proletarian Brigade, as the central column, had the task of crossing the northern slopes of Prenj, toward Glavatičevo and Crvanj mountain, to reach the upper Neretva at Ulog and Obalj.
- 7th Division with its two brigades was deployed on the right flank, with the task of making the river crossing at Jablanica, circumventing Prenj from the south, and blocking the road from Mostar at Zijemlje.
- 1st Division with the 7th Krajina Brigade (which replaced the 1st Proletarian), was to act as the rearguard, slowing down the German advance from Bugojno towards Jablanica, and securing the main crossing point.
- 9th Division had the task of denying the enemy access to Neretva from the south and south-west.

In order to counter this strategic "checkmate" Tito prepared an elaborate deception. He ordered his sappers to actually blow up all the bridges on the river. When air reconnaissance brought this information to the German command, they concluded that the Partisans must be preparing a final dash north of their current position (along the western shore of the Neretva), and had blown up the bridge to prevent desertion as well as attack by Chetnik forces from the other side of the river. They thus began a redeployment of troops in the area to block the anticipated movement.

This redeployment gave the Partisan engineers precious time needed to sufficiently repair the bridge and to eliminate the Chetnik troops defending its far side. The Germans, characteristically, quickly caught on, but were unable to correct their mistake and prepare a serious attack in time, because of their previous redeployment orders. With their rearguard fighting off an increasingly powerful German advance, the Partisans crossed the river under intense aerial bombardment (the Axis deployed large Luftwaffe formations), but the mountainous landscape prevented accurate destruction of the makeshift bridge. After the escape was complete, the weak bridge was finally rendered useless to prevent pursuit. The humiliating strategic defeat was amplified by Tito being able to keep his well-known pledge not to leave the wounded behind, as they faced certain execution at the hands of the Axis (which later actually happened in the aftermath of the Battle of the Sutjeska).

The operation marked the "high point of Chetnik collaboration with the Axis powers". In order to ensure the operation's success, Draža Mihailović relocated from Montenegro to Kalinovik where Zaharije Ostojić, commander of operations in Herzegovina, was situated. On 9 March, Mihailović informed Colonel Bajo Stanišić:

"I manage the whole operation through Branko [Zaharije Ostojić]. No action is ordered without my approval. Branko is keeping me informed of even the smallest details. All his proposals are reviewed, studied, approved or corrected. In this we follow these principles: we work for ourselves alone and for no one else; we are concerned only with the interests of the Serbs and of future Yugoslavia; for the achievement of our objectives we use one enemy against another, precisely as do all our enemies with exception, and achieve our objectives with the least sacrifice, but are prepared even for the greatest sacrifices if this is necessary in the general interest, and to safeguard the people from all unnecessary exposure to danger in their homes."

The Chetniks would have been disarmed by Germans if they had succeeded against Partisans in Operation Weiss.

== Aftermath ==
By the end of March, the Germans claimed to have killed about 11,915 Partisans, executed 616, and captured 2,506. Despite these heavy losses and a tactical victory for the Axis powers, the partisan formations secured their command and the hospital, and were able to continue operations. In fact, once they reached the eastern parts of Bosnia and Herzegovina, the Partisans had to face only the Chetniks, and in turn almost entirely incapacitated them in the area west of the Drina river.

The next major operation in Yugoslavia was Operation Schwarz.

== Order of battle ==
=== Partisans ===
Main Operational Group

- 1st Proletarian Division
  - 1st Proletarian Brigade
  - 3rd Proletarian Sandžak Brigade
  - 3rd Krajina Brigade
- 2nd Proletarian Division
  - 2nd Proletarian Brigade
  - 4th Proletarian Montenegro Brigade
  - 2nd Dalmatian Brigade
- 3rd Assault Division
  - 5th Montenegro Brigade
  - 10th Herzegovina Brigade
  - 1st Dalmatian Brigade
- 7th Banija Division (from 27 January)
  - 7th Banija Brigade
  - 8th Banija Brigade
  - 16th Banija Brigade
- 9th Dalmatian Division (from 5 March)
  - 3rd Dalmatian Brigade
  - 4th Dalmatian Brigade
  - 5th Dalmatian Brigade
- 7th Krajina Brigade (from 5 March)

1st Croatian Corps

- 6th Lika Division
  - 1st Lika Brigade
  - 2nd Lika Brigade
  - 9th Lika Brigade
- 7th Banija Division (until 27 January)
  - 7th Banija Brigade
  - 8th Banija Brigade
  - 16th Banija Brigade
- 8th Kordun Division
  - 5th Kordun Brigade
  - 15th Kordun Brigade
- 6th Littoral-Gorski Kotar Brigade
- 14th Littoral-Gorski Kotar Brigade

1st Bosnian Corps

- 4th Krajina Division
  - 2nd Krajina Brigade
  - 5th Krajina Brigade
  - 6th Krajina Brigade
  - 8th Krajina Brigade
  - 12th Krajina Brigade (from 20 February)
- 5th Krajina Division
  - 1st Krajina Brigade
  - 4th Krajina Brigade
  - 7th Krajina Brigade (until 4 March)
- 10th Krajina Division (from 13 February)
  - 9th Krajina Brigade
  - 10th Krajina Brigade

== In popular culture ==
The 1969 Oscar-nominated motion picture The Battle of Neretva depicts these events.

Alistair MacLean's 1968 thriller novel Force 10 From Navarone, subsequently filmed, also brings forth the fight of outnumbered Partisans against Germans and Chetniks, and the blowing up of the Neretva bridge. But the actual historical events are not in play, and the story is entirely fictional.

== See also ==
- Anti-partisan operations in World War II
- Resistance during World War II
- Seven enemy offensives
