= Bihać Republic =

Yugoslav territory liberated from the Nazis

Republic of Bihać Bihaćka republika
- 4 November 1942–29 January 1943
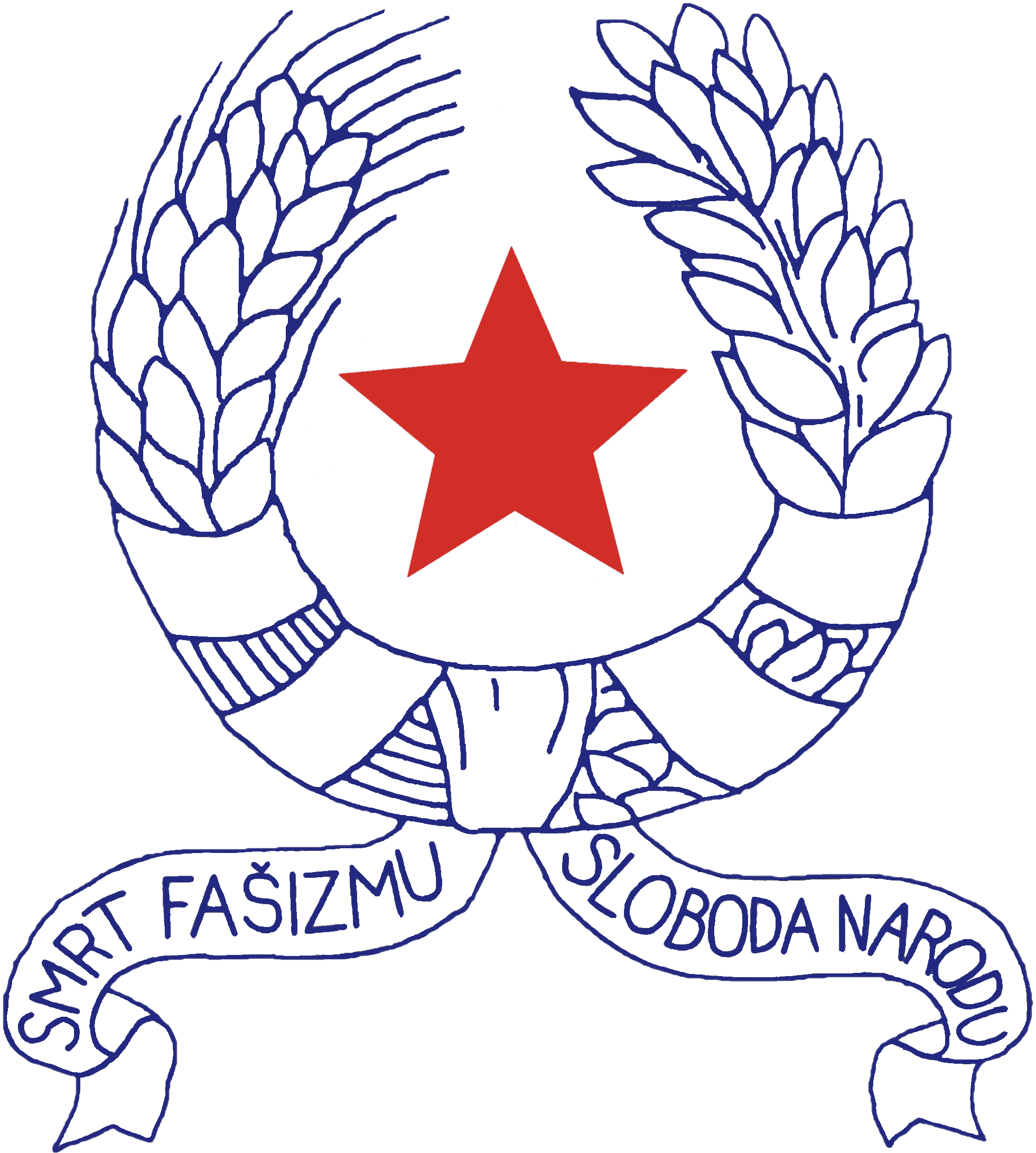
- Flag Coat of arms

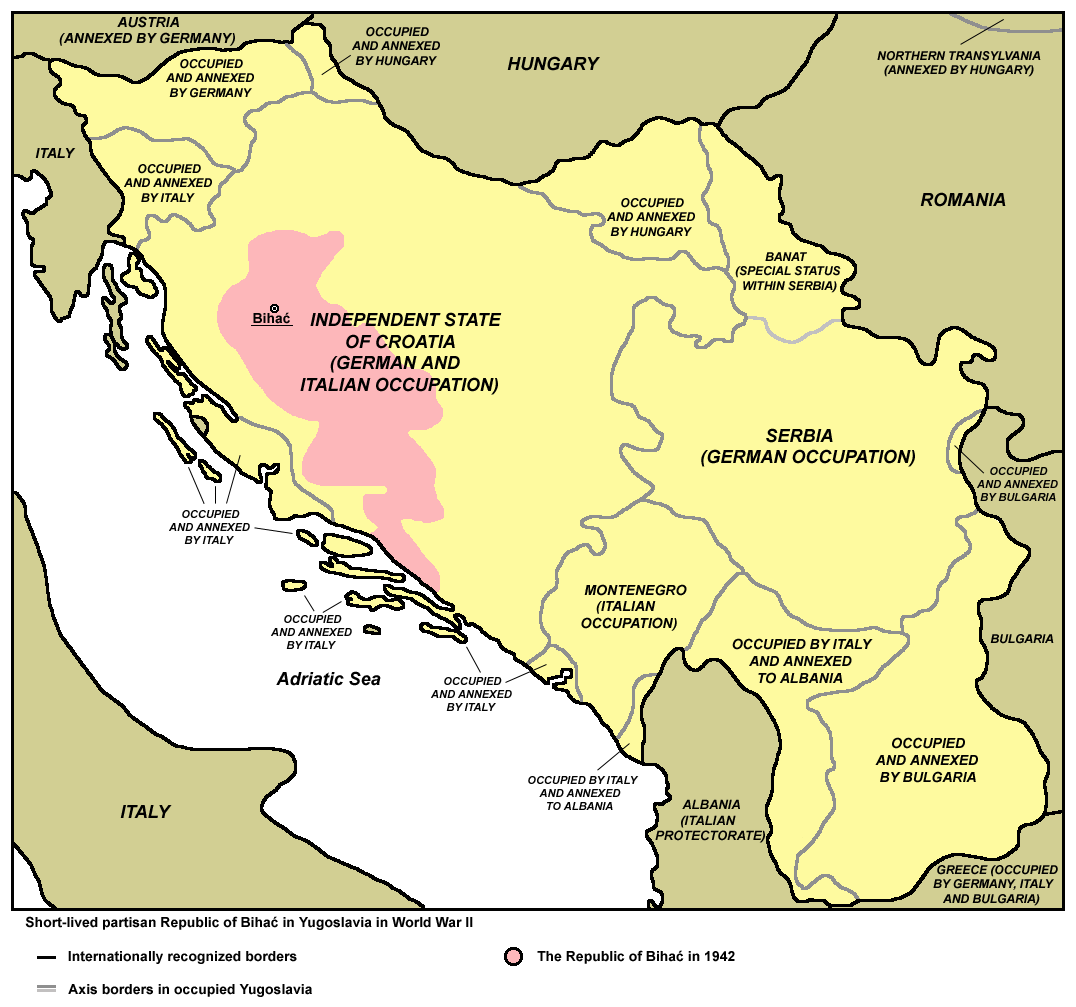
- The Republic of Bihać (pink) within occupied Kingdom of Yugoslavia
- Status: Liberated territory of Yugoslavia
- Capital: Bihać; 44°49′N 15°52′E
- Common languages: Serbo-Croatian
- Historical era: World War II
  - Established: 4 November 1942
  - Disestablished: 29 January 1943
Preceded by	Succeeded by
Independent State of Croatia	Independent State of Croatia
- Today part of: Bosnia and Herzegovina; Croatia

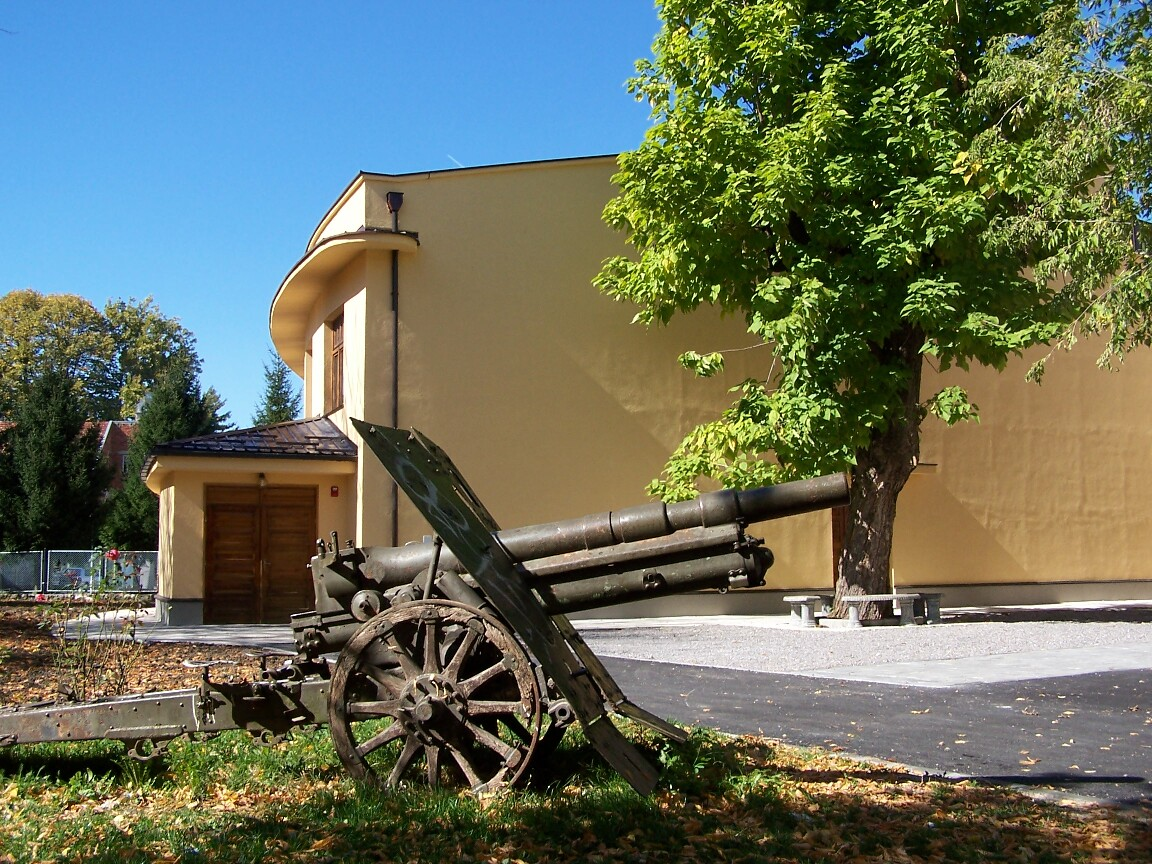
The building in Bihać where the AVNOJ met for the first time (Skoda 100 mm Model 16/19 howitzer in the foreground).

The Bihać Republic (Serbo-Croatian Latin: Bihaćka Republika, Cyrillic: Бихаћка Република) was a symbolic name for a single liberated territory that emerged in November 1942 and lasted until January 1943 in a liberated area of Nazi-occupied Yugoslavia. It was established by the Partisan resistance movement following the liberation of Bihać. Bihać became its administrative center and the first session of the Anti-Fascist Council of the People's Liberation of Yugoslavia (AVNOJ) was held there on 26 November 1942.

== Liberation of the territory ==
In the summer and fall of 1942 Partisan forces greatly improved their organization and tactics. Organized in mobile brigades, Partisans were able to attack and overpower isolated Axis garrisons of battalion size and, in some cases, even larger. Partisan units in western Bosnia and Croatia were significantly reinforced with the arrival of 6 brigades from eastern parts of Yugoslavia in summer 1942.

Bihać, the central town of the territory, was liberated on 4 November 1942 after a two-day battle involving eight Krajina and Croatian brigades against the 4th Ustaša Brigade and 12th Croatian Home Guard Regiment. Some towns were liberated earlier (Vojnić, Vrginmost, Korenica, Drvar, Glamoč, and Bosanski Petrovac), and others were liberated as a continuation of the Bihać operation: Bosanska Krupa on 5, Cazin on 6, and Slunj on 14 November. Several towns were liberated during separate attacks: Jajce on 26 November, Livno on 15 December, Tomislavgrad on 19 December 1942, and Teslić on 1 January 1943. Udbina and Bosansko Grahovo were evacuated by Ustaša and Italian units under Partisan pressure. Some towns were attacked unsuccessfully: Bosanski Novi and Dvor na Uni on 26–28 November, and Sanski Most on 10–22 December.

With these operations, large swaths of territory, from Karlovac in the west to Prozor in the east, were cleared of Axis forces. Partisans established control over an area that was some 250 kilometres (160 mi) long and 50–70 kilometres (30–40 mi) wide. Some towns were retaken by Axis forces in local attacks: Jajce was reoccupied on 6 December, and Teslić on 8 January by Germans. However, most of the territory was reoccupied in large offensives (Weiss I and Weiss II). Germans retook Bihać on 29 January, Drvar on 27 February, and Livno on 5 March 1943.

== See also ==
- Partisan Long March
- Republic of Užice

== Sources ==
- Kapetanović, Hajro, ed. (1965). Bihaćka Republika, Knjiga I - Zbornik Članaka [Republic of Bihać, Book I - Collection of Articles] (in Bosnian). Bihać: Muzeja Avnoja i Pounja.
- Kapetanović, Hajro, ed. (1965). Bihaćka Republika, Knjiga II - Zbornik Dokumenata [Republic of Bihać, Book II - Collection of Documents] (in Bosnian). Bihać: Muzeja Avnoja i Pounja.
- Popović, Jovo (1982). Ratne Uspomene Koste Nađa; Bihaćka Republika [War Memories of Kosta Nađa; Republic of Bihać] (in Bosnian). Zagreb: Spektar.
- Schmider, Klaus (2002). Partisanenkrieg in Jugoslawien 1941-1944 [Partisan War in Yugoslavia 1941-1944] (in German). Hamburg, Berlin, Bonn: Verlag E.S. Mittler & Sohn GmbH. ISBN 3-8132-0794-3.
- Tomasevich, Jozo (1975). War and Revolution in Yugoslavia, 1941–1945: The Chetniks. Stanford: Stanford University Press. ISBN 978-0-8047-0857-9 – via Google Books.
