= Makljen =

Coordinates: 43°50′42″N 17°35′38″E

Makljen is a mountain and mountain pass in Bosnia and Herzegovina. The elevation of the pass is 1,123 meters. It is part of the Raduša mountain range, on its eastern side. The Makljen Pass separates two river basins, the Neretva in the south and the Vrbas in the north. It is also a natural border between two counties (Herzegovina-Neretva Canton and Central Bosnia Canton), and two municipalities – Gornji Vakuf-Uskoplje and Prozor-Rama. The pass is 12 and 8 kilometers away from these municipal centers, respectively. At the very top of the pass was a monument to the Fallen Soldiers, a work by sculptor Antun Augustinčić from 1952, which was deliberately demolished in 1992. Another monument was built on Makljen in 1978, commemorating the Battle for the Wounded, a work by Bosnian artist Boško Kućanski, which was blown up in another crime in 2000. Remains are declared a National Monument of Bosnia and Herzegovina in 2016.

The main road M 16.2 from Bugojno via Uskoplje and Prozor-Rama to Jablanica runs over the pass.

On the west side of this road is the recreational center, Ramska kuća.
