= 18th (Croatian) Eastern Bosnian Brigade =

The 18th (Croatian) Eastern Bosnian Brigade (Serbo-Croatian: 18. hrvatska istočnobosanska brigada) was a World War II military unit of the Yugoslav Partisans. It was formed in October 1943 in the Husino village (in today's Bosnia and Herzegovina) after the capitulation of Italy forced the Germans to move a large part of their forces to the Adriatic coast (in order to disarm the Italian army before the Partisans did). The formation of the unit allowed the Partisans to liberate the lightly guarded city of Tuzla and hold it for 40 days, before the Germans retook it in Operation Ferkel.

During these forty days, the Partisans mobilised over 5,000 citizens of Tuzla and neighboring villages from which a total of three brigades would be formed and become the 27th Eastern Bosnian Division. The 18th Brigade was composed of: coal miners from Kreka, Bukinja, and Moluh; villagers from Spreča river valley and Majevica, mostly Croats; around 80 former Croatian Home Guard officers, NCO's, soldiers and Gendarmes (who joined the brigade and defected to Partisan side during the capture of Tuzla). This totalled 600 men in three battalions—many of whom were unarmed.

The Brigade's first casualty was not suffered in combat, Stjepan Presečen from the 2nd Battalion died from a heart attack during the march to Bresko. The Brigade spent the next few weeks training and gathering weapons with occasional skirmishes with Chetnik forces. Some twenty men deserted brigade during the first week of its existence, forcing the staff to work on discipline and moral.

== See also ==
- 5th Krajina (Kozara) Assault Brigade
- Yugoslav Partisans
- Yugoslav People's Liberation War
- Seven anti-Partisan offensives
- Resistance during World War II
