= Delko Bogdanić =

Croatian military officer

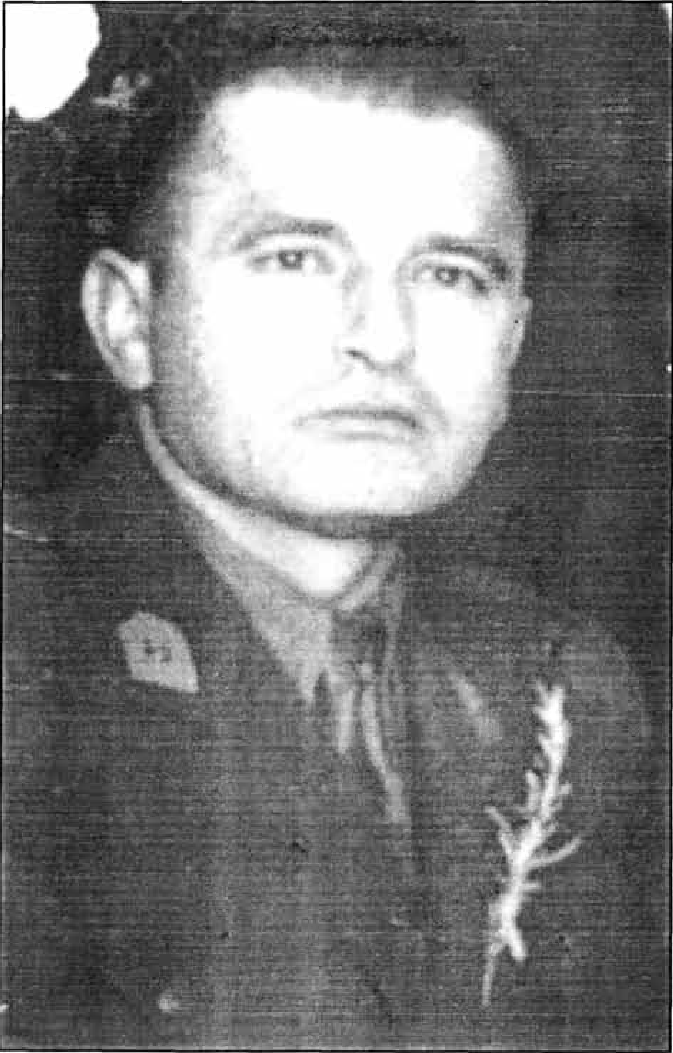
Delko Bogdanić in 1942

Delko Bogdanić (27 August 1910 – 30 November 1945) was a Croatian military officer who served in army of Ustaše and later in Crusaders guerilla army.

== Biography ==
Delko was born on 27 August 1910 in Ličko Lešće, he attended high school in Senj. After finishing high school he became a merchant. He participated in Velebit uprising. After the establishment of the Independent State of Croatia, he became a military officer in its armed forces. He commanded various units, most notable being 4th Standing Active Brigade. After the fall of NDH, he commanded a group of Crusaders guerrillas. His group operated in Velebit area. He committed suicide after his dugout was surrounded by OZNA forces.
