= Benakovac =

Benakovac Бенаковац
- Village
- Location within Bosnia and Herzegovina
- Coordinates: 44°47′43″N 16°18′47″E
- Country: Bosnia and Herzegovina
- Entity: Federation of Bosnia and Herzegovina
- Canton: Una-Sana
- Municipality: Bosanska Krupa

Area
  - Total: 3.75 sq mi (9.72 km^{2})

Population (2013)
  - Total: 35
  - Density: 9.3/sq mi (3.6/km^{2})
- Time zone: UTC+1 (CET)
  - Summer (DST): UTC+2 (CEST)

Benakovac (Serbian Cyrillic: Бенаковац) is a village in the municipality of Bosanska Krupa, Bosnia and Herzegovina.

== Demographics ==
According to the 2013 census, its population was 35.

Ethnicity in 2013
Ethnicity	Number	Percentage
Serbs	32	91.4%
other/undeclared	3	8.6%
Total	35	100%
