= Partisan Long March =

Military maneuver in World War II

- Part of World War II in Yugoslavia
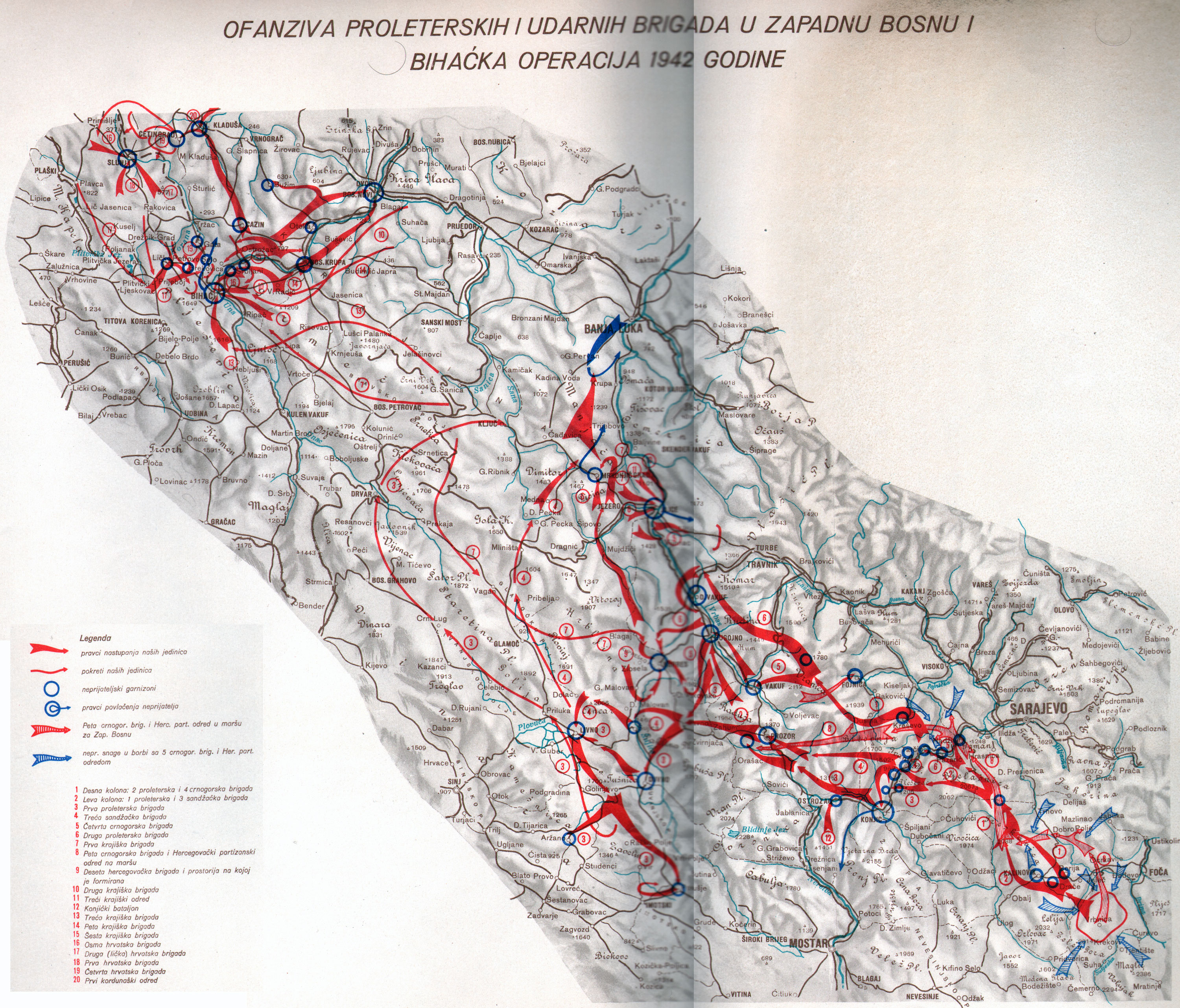
- Path of partisan brigade from eastern Bosnia to northwestern Bosnia.
Date	24 June 1942 – August 1942
Location	Independent State of Croatia (modern-day Bosnia and Herzegovina)
Result	Partisan victory, establishment of Bihać Republic

Belligerents
Yugoslav Partisans	Italy; Croatia; Chetniks

Commanders and leaders
Josip Broz Tito; Arso Jovanović; Koča Popović; Ratko Sofijanić; Vladimir Knežević; Peko Dapčević; Sava Kovačević; Vlado Šegrt	Mario Roatta; Rafael Boban

The Partisan Long March was the redeployment of Josip Broz Tito's Partisan Supreme Headquarters and the major fighting elements of the Yugoslav Partisans across the Independent State of Croatia (Serbo-Croatian: Nezavisna Država Hrvatska, NDH), from south-eastern to north-western Bosnia that commenced in late June 1942. The march followed the first large-scale joint German-Italian counter-insurgency operation in the NDH, Operation Trio, and the combined Italian-Montenegrin Chetnik offensive in Montenegro and eastern Herzegovina.

The majority of the units of the National Liberation Army (1st and 2nd Proletarian, 3rd Sandžak and 4th Montenegrin Brigades) and the Supreme Headquarters of the NOV and POJ set out from the territory of Mt Zelengora on June 24, 1942, for western Bosnia. Along the way, battles were fought with the enemy (Konjic, Bugojno, Prozor, Livno, Kupres) and a new liberated territory was created. At the end of July, the 5th Montenegrin Brigade joined these forces with the Herzegovinian NOP Detachment, from which the 10th Herzegovinian Proletarian Strike Brigade was then formed.

The campaign in Bosnian Krajina was not intended as a march, but to strike at the enemy, expand free territory in western Bosnia and create favorable conditions for further development of the uprising in the western parts of Yugoslavia, so it was planned to be carried out gradually, in stages. In the first stage, a sudden attack was to break and destroy enemy crews and destroy the Sarajevo-Mostar railway, and then, in the next stage, continue to advance to the northwest, take control of the territory on the right bank of the Neretva, in the upper Vrbas and Kupres, Livno, Imotski and connect with Krajina and Dalmatian units.

== Background ==
=== Partisan forces in early 1942 ===
During the first six months of 1942, the partisans suffered heavy losses in Second and Third Enemy Offensives in eastern Bosnia, Herzegovina, Sandžak and Montenegro. Because of these losses, as well as because of the successful Chetnik subversion in many partisan detachments, and to some extent also because of some serious mistakes in the so-called Leftist errors, partisan activity in those areas almost died out, and the partisan position became critical. At the same time, the Chetniks became stronger in these areas, partly due to subversion in partisan detachments, partly due to collaboration with the Italians, and in some areas with the Croatian Quisling forces to some extent, and thus indirectly with the Germans.

At the beginning of March 1942, the Supreme Headquarters sent the 1st and 2nd Proletarian Brigades to eastern Bosnia, where they overwhelmed Chetnik forces and liberated the region, thus providing significant assistance to the partisan forces there. In the first months of 1942, Montenegrin partisans kept most of Montenegro in their hands, despite increased pressure from Italians and Chetniks. By the joint action of the 2nd Proletarian Brigade, Herzegovinian and Montenegrin partisans, Borač, a strong Ustashe stronghold, near Kalinovik, was liberated. With the liberation of Kalinovik, the liberated territory of eastern Bosnia was connected with the liberated territory in Herzegovina and Montenegro.

In western Bosnia, partisan detachments grew, consolidating free territory and liberating new areas. The insurgent forces in Grmeč and Kozara increased especially, and on May 16, 1942, the 1st and 2nd Krajina detachments liberated Prijedor, which was defended by about 2,000 enemy soldiers.

=== German-Italian offensive ===
In order to prevent the further spread of the uprising, Germans and Italians, on 3 March 1942, in Opatija, signed an agreement which reached a plan for a general offensive against the partisans. According to that plan, the first operations began on 15 April 1942 in eastern Bosnia, for the purpose of which the "Bader" battle group was formed. The goal of this operation was to destroy partisan units in the area of Rogatica-Kalinovik-Foča.

Due to the delays of the Italian divisions, which were held back by partisan forces in Herzegovina, as well as the successful resistance of the 1st and 2nd Proletarian Brigades and other partisan forces, the enemy's plan failed. 1st and 2nd Proletarian Brigades managed to move to Sandžak and Montenegro, and partly to Herzegovina, to help the partisan forces, to which the Italians, with a very strong force of about 9 divisions, launched an offensive in mid-1942, and managed to master these areas by the end of June.

== March to Bosnian Krajina ==
The Supreme Headquarters, which was in Foča until 10 May 1942, managed, with the help of the 1st and 2nd Proletarian Brigades, to withdraw part of the partisan forces from Montenegro and Herzegovina and form new units from them: 3rd Proletarian Sandžak Brigade, 4th and 5th Proletarian Montenegrin Brigade and the Herzegovina Detachment.

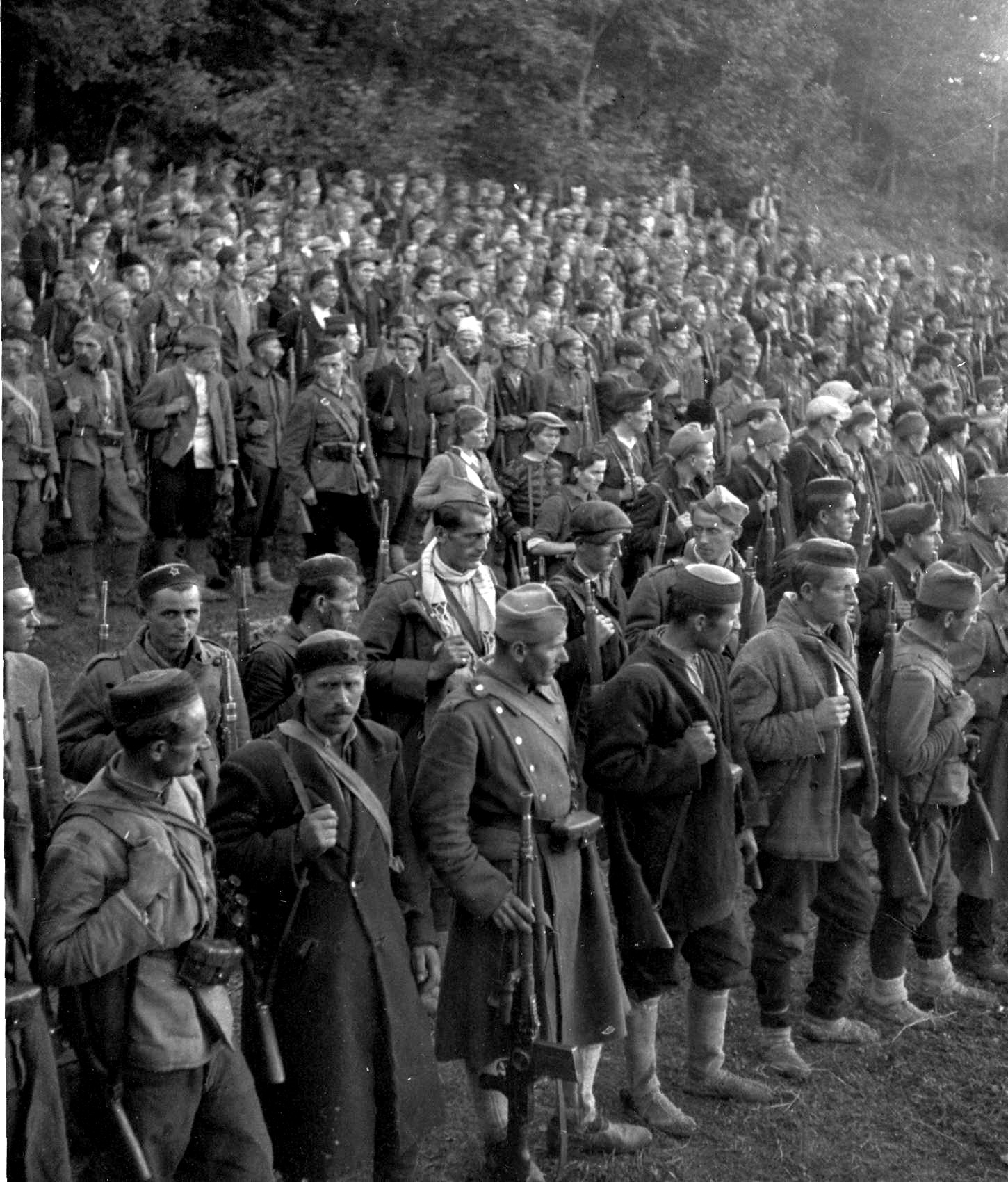
Soldiers of 4th Montenegrin Brigade in Ljubina area on Zelengora June 19, 1942.

Decision of Partisan Supreme HQ to move west proved to be very prudent for a number of reasons, the most important of which was that the Italians, on the basis of the Zagreb agreement concluded on June 19, withdrew a large part of their troops from zones II and III. Ustashe regime had neither the time nor the strength to adequately protect these areas.

Group of brigades, which consisted of: the 1st and 2nd Proletarian, 3rd Sandžak and 4 Montenegrin Brigades, together the Supreme Headquarters, moved from the Zelengora region on 24 June 1942 to western Bosnia in the general direction Kalinovik-Prozor-Kupres. 5th Proletarian Montenegrin Brigade and the Herzegovinian Detachment with a partisan hospital were left on the border of Herzegovina, Montenegro and Bosnia, in order to penetrate Montenegro and Herzegovina in a more favorable situation.

After managing to break up the Ustasha forces around the Treskavica mountain, on 3 July 1942, partisan brigades carried out a surprise attack on the Sarajevo-Konjic railway between Hadžići and Konjic. During the night, the brigades defeated the enemy crews at the stations, destroyed important station facilities, destroyed the railway in several places, as well as all important bridges. Dozens of wagons and several locomotives were destroyed.

=== Attack on Konjic ===
After a series of diversions on the railway, 1st Proletarian Brigade broke up the enemy garrison in Konjic on the night between July 7 and 8, defending a battalion of Croatian Home Guard and two Ustasha companies, liberated the city and destroyed the railway station and furnace with about 25 locomotives. This was a major blow to the occupying forces and the NDH, because ties with Herzegovina were severed for more than two months and the transport of bauxite from the Mostar region was prevented.

From the railway, partisan brigades Group continued its operations in two directions: the right column, composed of 2nd Proletarian and 4th Montenegrin Brigade, attacked the enemy garrisons in the upper course of the Vrbas via Bitovanje and Vranica; the left column, made up of 1st Proletarian and 3rd Sandžak Brigades, headed in the direction of Prozor-Livno. After the capture of Gornji Vakuf, the right column fought fierce battles around Bugojno and Donji Vakuf, while the left column liberated Prozor, Šujica and Duvno, and in cooperation with the Dalmatian and Krajina partisans liberated Livno on August 5.

=== Attack on Livno ===
The liberation of Livno was a great success of the NOVJ. 2nd Battalion of the 1st Proletarian Brigade invaded the city through clearings, high wire barriers and between masonry-concrete bunkers, destroyed the enemy forces it encountered, severed ties and disrupted the enemy's command, and cooperated with other battalions attacking the city.

The Ustasha garrison had losses of about 200 dead (including those executed), with its own losses of 5 dead and 20 wounded. Partisans seized all weapons and ammunition, including 6 tons of explosives. About 300 captured members of Home Guard were disarmed and released, and 12 Germans were captured, who were employees of Organization Todt, that was engaged in the economic exploitation of the occupied areas. These Germans would be exchanged in September for captured partisans and arrested activists. This would the first exchange of prisoners between Partisan forces on the one hand, and the German authorities on the other.

At the beginning of August, 5th Proletarian Montenegrin Brigade and the Herzegovinian Detachment arrived in the liberated Prozor, and after fierce fighting with the Axis and Chetnik forces in the wider region of Zelengora, they were forced to move in this direction.

=== Attack on Kupres ===
Particularly difficult battles were fought group of partisan brigades, composed of 2nd Proleterian and 4th Montenegrin Brigades, parts of 3rd Sandžak and 10th Herzegovinian Brigades (formed on August 10 by the Herzegovinian Detachment and the Konjic Partisan Battalion), together with 1st Krajina Brigade and 3rd Krajina Detachment for Kupres from 11 to 14 August.

== Aftermath ==
=== Merging free territory ===
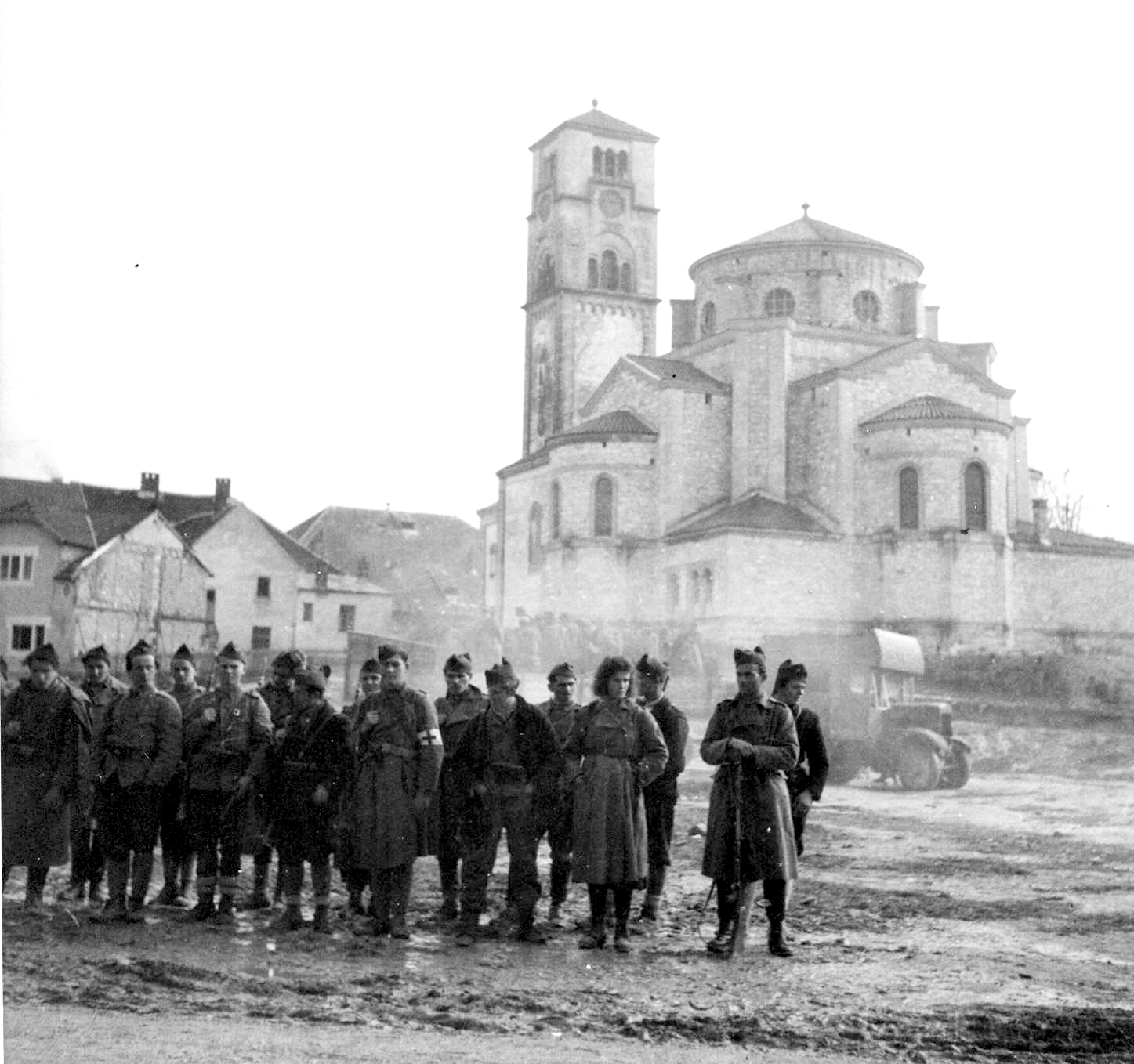
Partisans in Bihać, autumn of 1942

In further battles, Proleterian brigades with the Krajina and Dalmatian units liberated: Aržano, Mrkonjić Grad and Jajce. This created the conditions for the development of the partisan movement in the areas that had been under the influence of the Ustashas until then, and the newly liberated territory was connected with the liberated territory in the Bosnian Krajina via Livno and Mrkonjić Grad. At the end of August, partisan brigades reached Bosanski Petrovac via Drvar. Preparations for the attack on Bihać and the establishment of the Bihać Republic will follow.

=== Axis and Quisling reactions ===
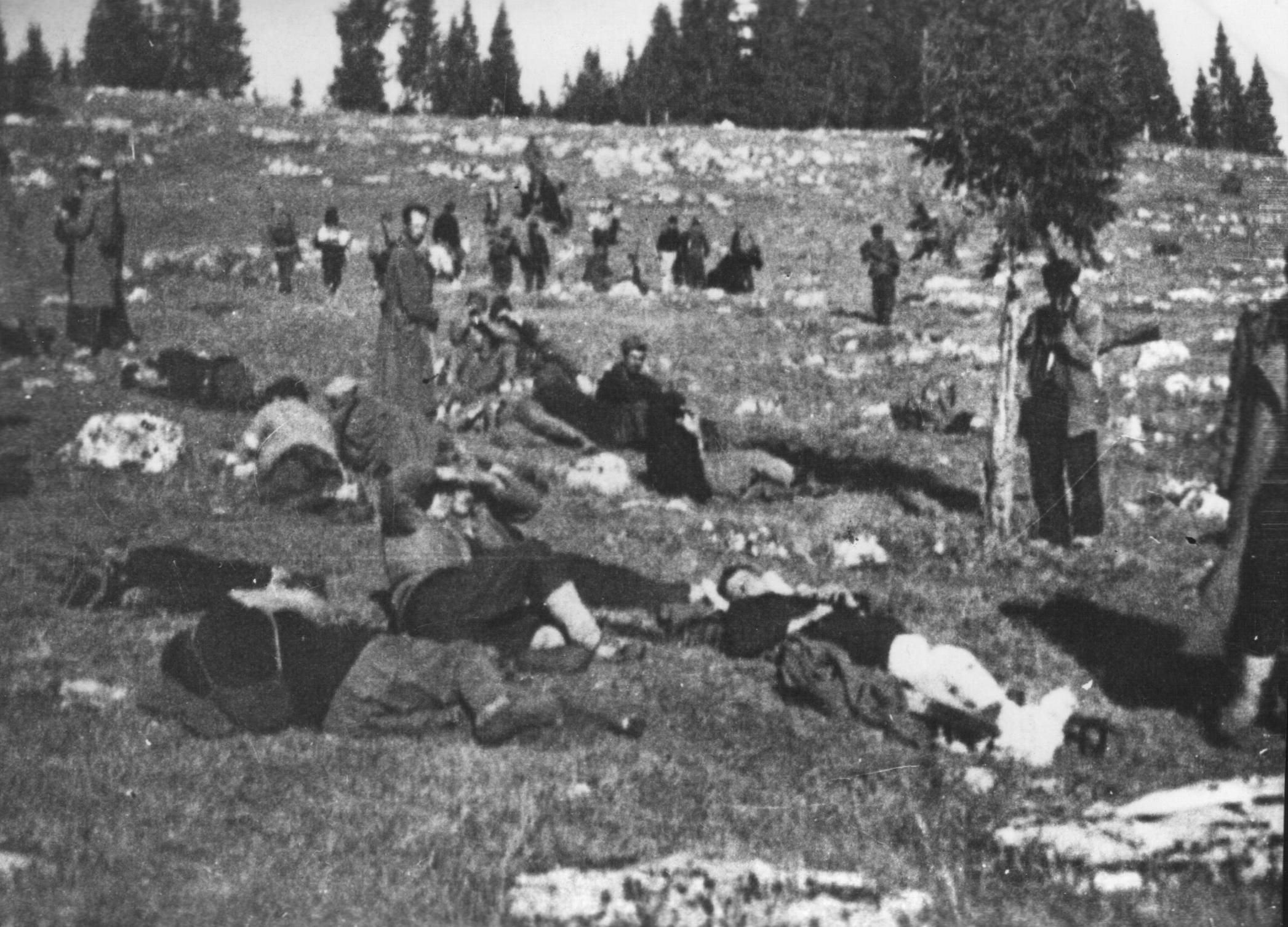
Soldiers of 4th Montenegrin Brigade carry their wounded comrades after battle of Jajce

Although in autumn 1942 Partisans would be forced to leave Prozor to the Italians, Livno to the Croatian quisling forces, and Jajce to the Germans, the partisans nevertheless controlled the area from the western approaches to the Neretva in the south to Karlovac in the north, an area of 250 km in length and 40 – 70 km in width. The crisis of partisan war fortunes seemed to have passed: they now had nine divisions and many independent partisan detachments, their military organization strengthened, they built a system of civilian government in those areas in the form of national liberation committees, and they confirmed themselves politically by convening an assembly in newly liberated Bihać, which was constituted as the Anti-Fascist Council of the People's Liberation of Yugoslavia (AVNOJ). It was obvious that they were now able to intensify their activity against the Axis and the Croatian Quisling forces, as well as against the Chetniks.
