= Šćit, Prozor =

Šćit
- Village
- Location within Bosnia and Herzegovina
- Coordinates: 43.8012°N 17.5280°E
- Country: Bosnia and Herzegovina
- Entity: Federation of Bosnia and Herzegovina
- Canton: Herzegovina-Neretva
- Municipality: Prozor

Area
  - Total: 1.37 sq mi (3.56 km^{2})

Population (2013)
  - Total: 199
  - Density: 145/sq mi (55.9/km^{2})
- Time zone: UTC+1 (CET)
  - Summer (DST): UTC+2 (CEST)

Šćit is a village in the municipality of Prozor-Rama, Bosnia and Herzegovina. It is located on an island in the Ramsko Lake.

== Demographics ==
According to the 2013 census, its population was 199, all Croats.
