= 7th Division (Yugoslav Partisans) =

7th Banija Division
- Flag of Democratic Federal Yugoslavia (used by the Partisans)
- Active: 1942–1945
- Country: Democratic Federal Yugoslavia
- Branch: Yugoslav Partisan Army
- Type: Infantry
- Size: 2,539 soldiers (upon formation)
- Part of: 10th Corps; 4th Army
- Engagements: World War II in Yugoslavia

Commanders
- Notable commanders: Pavle Jakšić

The 7th Banija Assault Division (Sedma banijska udarna divizija) was a Yugoslav Partisan division formed on 22 November 1942. It was formed from the 7th Banija Brigade, the 8th Banija Brigade and the 13th Proletarian Brigade. Pavle Jakšić commanded the division and its political commissar was Đuro Kladarin. For the most of its existence it operated in the areas controlled by the Independent State of Croatia.
