= 5th Krajina (Kozara) Assault Brigade =

The 5th Krajina (Kozara) Assault Brigade was a World War II military unit of the Yugoslav Partisans. It was formed on September 22, 1942, at Palež on the Kozara mountain out of the 2nd 'Mladen Stojanović' Partisan Detachment. On the day of the brigade was formed it had around 1,100 soldiers armed with 940 rifles and 45 light machine-guns.

During actions in September and October 1943, the brigade killed 76 enemy soldiers and one officer, taking as prisoners a further 22 soldiers and one officer, while capturing 25 rifles, 1 light machine-gun, 2 submachine-guns, and 2 pistols, also destroying 5 trucks. These actions raised attention of German 714th Infantry division since it was thought that Kozara was pacified during Spring offensive forcing brigade to leave Kozara to before another offensive was launched.
The unit later participated in many operations, among others the Belgrade Offensive.

== Bibliography ==
- Borojević, Ljubomir; Samardžija, Dušan; Bašić, Rade (1973). PETA KOZARAČKA BRIGADA. Beograd: Narodna knjiga.
- Samardžija, Dušan (1987). JEDANAESTA KRAJIŠKA NOU DIVIZIJA. Beograd: Vojnoizdavački i novinski centar.

== See also ==
- 18th (Croatian) Eastern Bosnian Brigade
- Yugoslav Partisans
- Yugoslav People's Liberation War
- Seven anti-Partisan offensives
- Resistance during World War II
