= 7th SS Volunteer Mountain Division Prinz Eugen =

German mountain division

- 7. SS-Freiwilligen Gebirgs-Division "Prinz Eugen"
- Insignia of 7th SS Volunteer Mountain Division Prinz Eugen (Odal SS rune)
- Active: 1942–45
- Country: Nazi Germany
- Branch: (Schutzstaffel) Waffen-SS
- Type: Gebirgsjäger
- Role: Counterinsurgency; Mountain warfare
- Size: Division
- Nickname: Prinz Eugen
- Mottos: Vorwärts, Prinz Eugen! ("Forward, Prince Eugene!")
- Engagements: World War II; Operation Kopaonik; Operation Weiss; Operation Schwarz; Operation Gama; Rommel offensive; Operation Kugelblitz; Operation Rösselsprung; Operation Hackfleisch

Commanders
- Notable commanders: Artur Phleps; Karl von Oberkamp; Otto Kumm; August Schmidhuber

The 7th SS Volunteer Mountain Division "Prinz Eugen" (7. SS-Freiwilligen Gebirgs-Division "Prinz Eugen"), initially named the SS-Volunteer Division Prinz Eugen (SS-Freiwilligen-Division "Prinz Eugen"), was a mountain infantry division of the Waffen-SS, an armed branch of the German Nazi Party that served alongside but was never formally part of the Wehrmacht during World War II. At the post-war Nuremberg trials, the Waffen-SS was declared to be a criminal organisation due to its major involvement in war crimes and crimes against humanity. From 1942 to 1945, the division fought a counter-insurgency campaign against communist-led Yugoslav Partisan resistance forces in occupied Yugoslavia. It was formed in 1941 from both Reich Germans and Volksdeutsche – ethnic German volunteers and conscripts from the Banat, Independent State of Croatia, Hungary and Romania. The division surrendered on 11 May 1945 to Yugoslav Partisan forces, with thousands of stragglers captured by the 15th near the Austrian border, followed by mass executions of all captured.

== History ==
=== 1941 ===
After the invasion, occupation and dismantling of the Kingdom of Yugoslavia by the Axis powers on 6 April 1941, the Wehrmacht placed Serbia proper, the northern part of Kosovo (around Kosovska Mitrovica) and the Banat under a military government. The division was formed in late 1941 following the invasion initially from German-speaking Danube Swabian Selbstschutz in the Banat autonomous area within the Territory of the Military Commander in Serbia. The unit was given the title Prinz Eugen after Prince Eugene of Savoy, an outstanding military leader of the Habsburg Empire who liberated the Banat and Belgrade from the Ottoman Empire in the Austro-Turkish War of 1716–18. A key figure in the organisation of the division was the Higher SS and Police Leader in Serbia, SS-Obergruppenführer und Generalleutnant der Polizei (Police General) August Meyszner.

After the initial rush of Volksdeutsche to join, voluntary enlistments tapered off, and the new formation did not reach division size. Therefore, in August 1941, the SS discarded the voluntary approach, and after a favorable judgement from the SS court in Belgrade, imposed a mandatory military obligation on all Volksdeutsche in Banat, the first of its kind for non-Reichsdeutsche.

One of the reasons for the forced conscription of ethnic Germans was the disappointingly low number of volunteers for the division after the initial recruitments (no more than 5,000). While the division remained "volunteer" in name, few of the conscripted ethnic Germans actively sought entry into the unit. Reichsführer-SS Heinrich Himmler had announced that the wishes of the Volksdeutsche were irrelevant, while in connection with the Balkan Germans the SS head of recruitment Gottlob Berger remarked: "kein Mensch [kümmert] [sich ja] darum, was wir unten mit unseren Volksdeutschen tun" ("no person cares what we do with our ethnic Germans in the South").

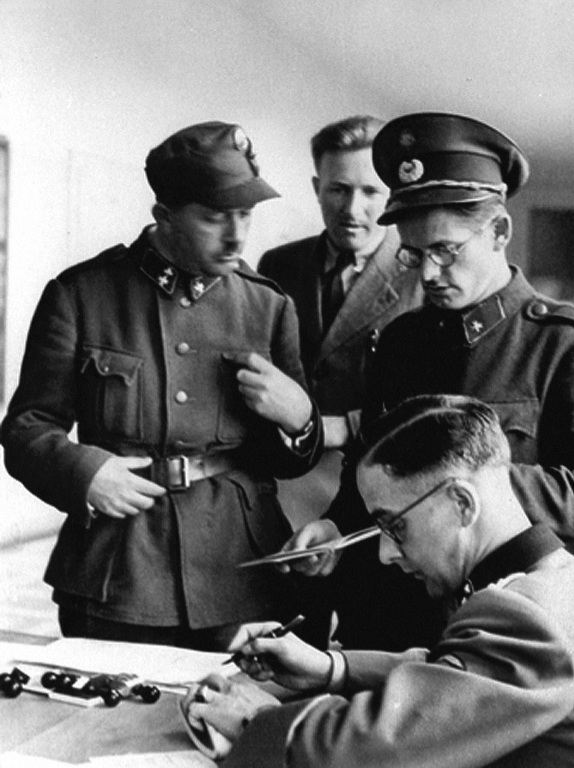
Croatian Homeguards of German ethnic background enlisting in the SS

Ethnic Germans in the Balkans were therefore powerless and could not oppose conscription into the SS. The unwillingness of ethnic Germans to serve in the unit is illustrated by a mutiny of 173 Croatian Germans of the division in 1943 in Bosnia when apparently the men of mixed ancestry did not speak German and were mistreated by their superiors as a result. Many of these men preferred service in the Croatian Home Guard for a variety of reasons; Himmler intervened personally in the problem.

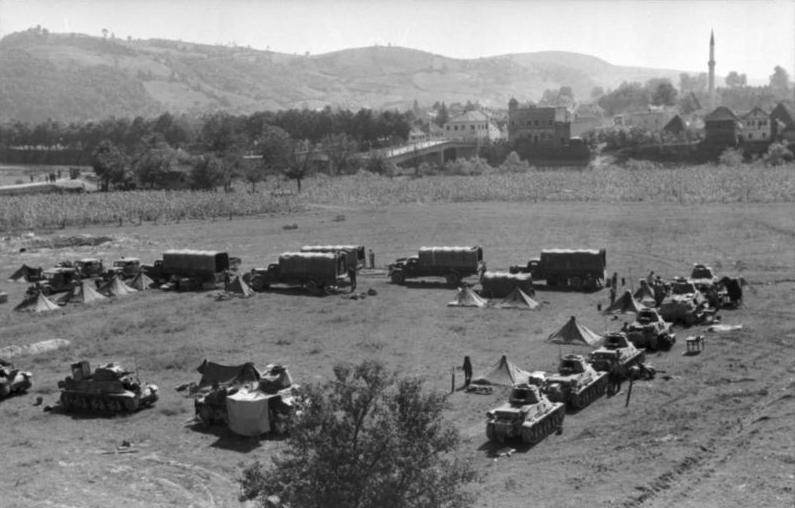
Vehicles of Prinz Eugen's 7th Panzer Battalion (including SOMUA S35 and Hotchkiss H39 tanks) laagering on the outskirts of a Bosnian town in 1941

In 1942, the Pančevo-based unit was declared a Mountain Division. Its troops were issued with a significant amount of non-standard German weapons and used captured equipment such as Czechoslovak machine guns like the ZB-53 and French light tanks. They were provided with excellent German-made mountain artillery such as the 10.5 cm Gebirgshaubitze 40 howitzer and 7.5 cm Gebirgsgeschütz 36 mountain gun. When the division was formed, it was assigned to the Balkans as an anti-Partisan mountain division.

=== 1942 ===
In October 1942, the division led a German-Bulgarian anti-guerrilla offensive by the name of Operation Kopaonik against the Chetniks in the Kopaonik, Goč and Jastrebac mountains in Serbia. The operation was aimed at the destruction of the Rasina Corps of the Yugoslav Army in the Fatherland, commanded by Major Dragutin Keserović, whose headquarters was located in the village of Kriva Reka.

In early October 1942, the division was deployed in southwestern Serbia, in Kraljevo, Užice, Ivanjica, Čačak, Raška, Kosovska Mitrovica, and Novi Pazar. On 5 October 1942, the division commander Artur Phleps ordered the German and Bulgarian forces to destroy the enemy. A comprehensive attack was planned: 20,000 well-armed and fully trained troops would encircle the 1,500 Serb guerrillas from four directions. Because of the perceived importance of this operation and to observe the first military operations of the newly established SS Division, Himmler himself travelled to Kraljevo in the German occupation zone; Himmler was in Kraljevo from 15 to 18 October 1942 and toured the division. German and Bulgarian forces began their attack on the Chetnik territory at dawn on 12 October 1942, proceeding from four directions. However, Keserović ordered his units to regroup into smaller squads for easy maneuvering and penetration, and the Rasina Corps was able to escape from the Axis ring entrapment.

The division's first major action thus ended in a failure, as the Germans and Bulgarians cleared the Chetnik free territory (and in the process committed war crimes against the Serbian civilian population), yet the Chetniks themselves successfully withdrew beyond the reach of the occupation forces. The Prinz Eugen was next involved in counter-insurgency activities on the Serbian-Montenegro border in the mountains east of river Ibar.

=== 1943 ===
Afterwards, the division took part in the Fourth anti-Partisan Offensive (Operation Weiss) in Croatia's Zagreb-Karlovac area. There, together with Italian forces, the Germans attempted to defeat the Yugoslav Partisans commanded by Josip Broz Tito, but the operation failed as most of the Partisans managed to evade the main attack. In Operation Weiss I, the division advanced from Karlovac area against the Yugoslav National Liberation Army (NOVJ) resistance and on January 29 captured informal partisan capital Bihać. In Operation Weiss II, it forced its way from western Bosnia to Mostar area in Hercegovina and also deployed units northwest of Sarajevo.

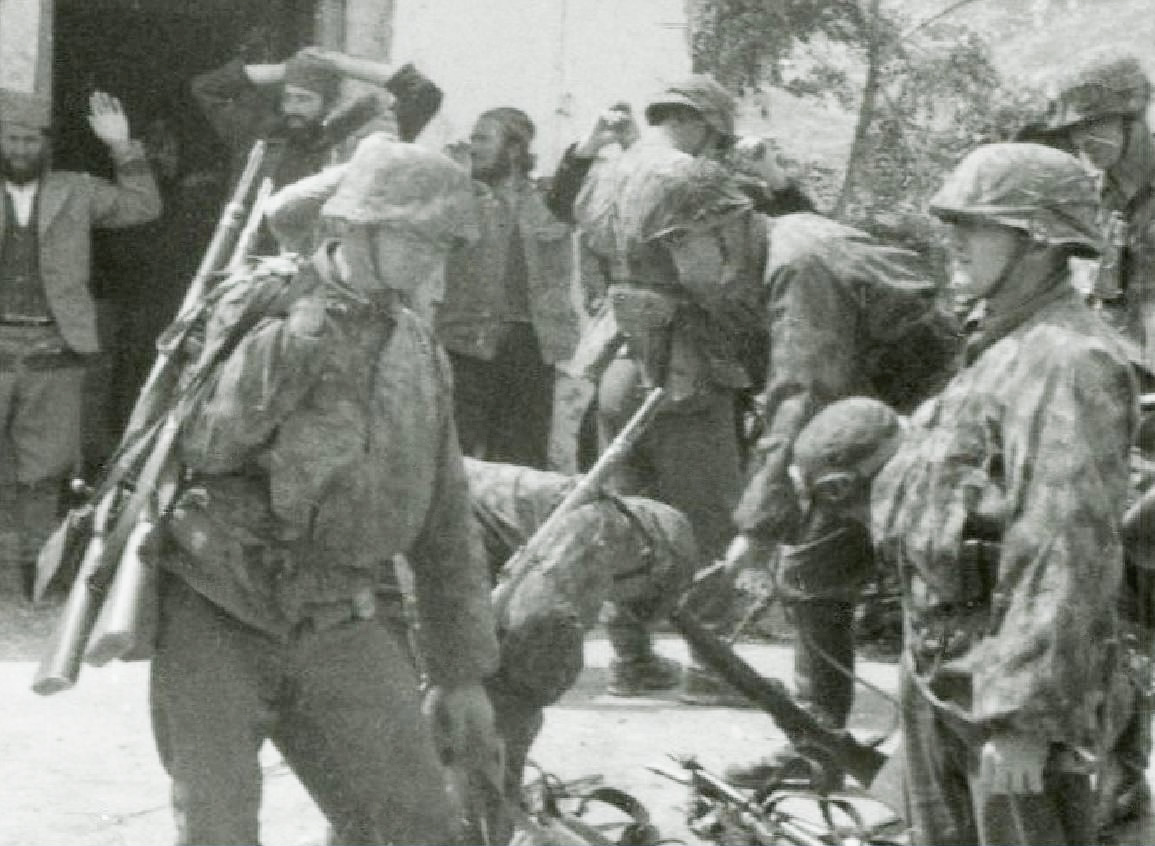
Prinz Eugen soldiers disarming the Lim-Sandžak Chetnik Detachment prior to Operation Schwarz, May 1943

From 15 May – 15 June, the Prinz Eugen took a part in the subsequent Fifth anti-Partisan Offensive (Operation Schwarz) aiming to pin Tito's main force of about 20,000 Partisans against the Zelengora mountain, in south-eastern Bosnia. During the battle, the division received a task to move through the Italian occupation zone in order to block the possible advance of Partisans towards the Adriatic Sea and the Italian-occupied Albania, to close the south-east part of the encirclement and then advance north over mountainous terrain to crush the Partisan forces. In eleven-day fightings from May 20, division captured Šavnik. For this success, Sturmbannführer Dietsche as well as commander Phleps both received first two Knight's Crosses for the division. In the following days, the focal point of the battle shifted westward. After the main group of the Partisans headed by the 1st Proletarian Division broke out of the encirclement, two battalions of the division that were moved to cover the left bank of the Sutjeska river and block the Partisans' escape route were surprised by the attack of three battalions of the NOVJ 1st Dalmatian Strike Brigade and one from 5th Montenegro Brigade at Tjentište pushing them back. They recovered their positions during a night battle and defeated the Partisan units. In the operation Schwarz the division suffered total losses of 613 men.

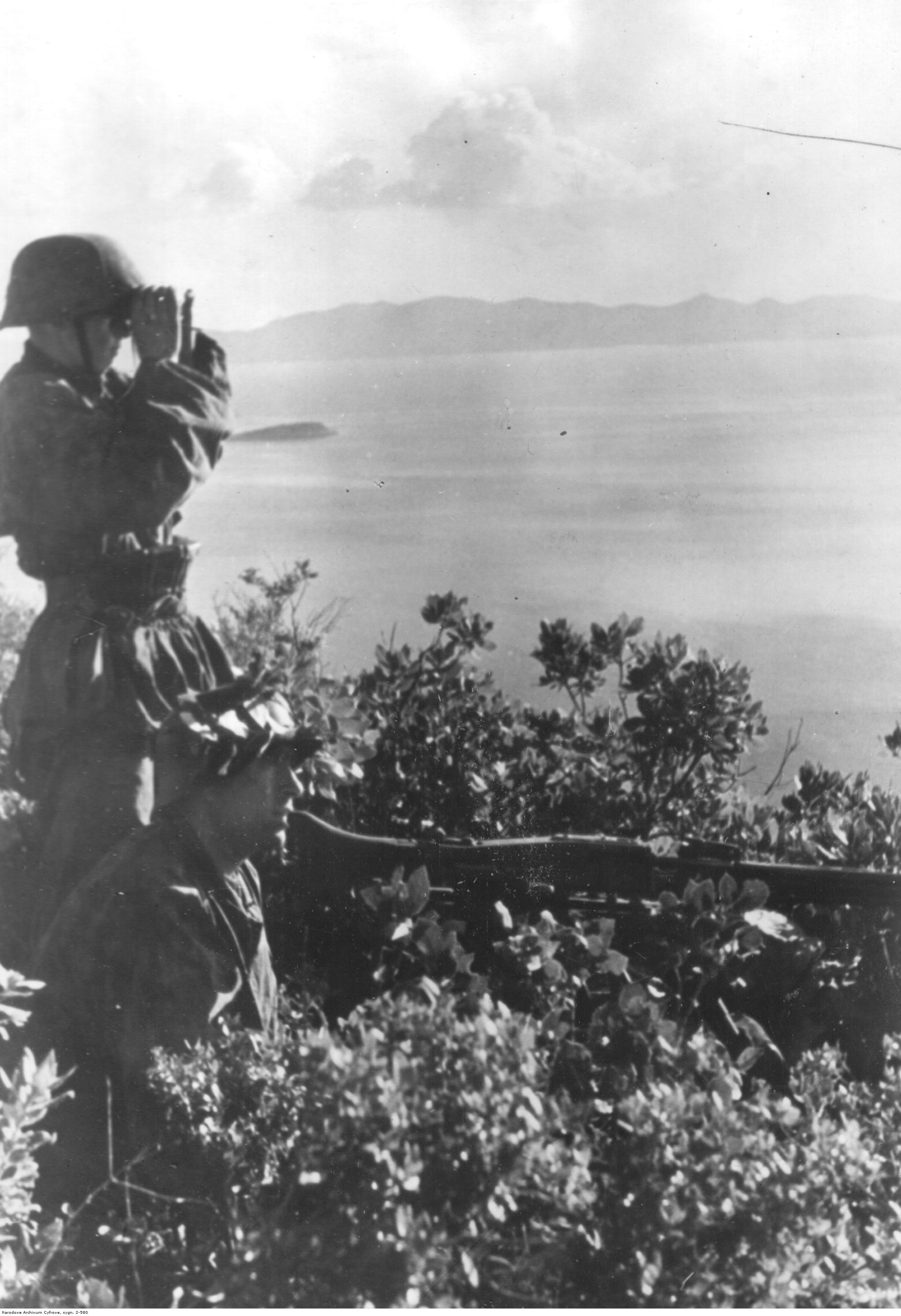
Prinz Eugen MG 42 position on the Dalmatian coast, 1943

In August 1943, the division became a part of the XV Mountain Corps and was sent to the Dalmatian coast, to disarm the local Italian forces in September 1943 after the Italian government had surrendered to the Allies. In exploiting Italian capitulation, Tito's forces succeeded in seizing control of the most part of the Dalmatian coast. In sixteen-days long battle the division pushed back NOVJ units and on September 29 reoccupied Split, forcing the resisting Italians to surrender. In October, division participated in Operation Landsturm, another anti-Partisan operation in Omiš, Ploče and Biokovo. In battles for Split and Biokovo coastline, the Prinz Eugen suffered losses of 1,582 killed, wounded and missing in action.

The division was reorganized on 22 October 1943 and was renamed the 7th SS Volunteer Mountain Division Prinz Eugen. In November, the unit was attached to the V SS Mountain Corps and took part in anti-Partisan Operations Kugelblitz and Schneesturm in eastern Bosnia during the next month.

=== 1944 ===
In January 1944, the division was involved in more anti-Partisan actions in Operation Waldrausch. It then took part in Seventh anti-Partisan Offensive (Operation Rösselsprung) which began on 25 May 1944. This operation had the task of killing or capturing Tito, and the operation was spearheaded by the 500th SS Fallschirmjäger-Bataillon and supported by the Brandenburg Regiment. In this timespan many other ethnic groups joined the division, such as ethnic Croats, ethnic Hungarians, and over 1,000 ethnic Serbs who volunteered for the division at General Phelps' office, most of whom were either ideologically or otherwise motivated to fight against the Partisans.

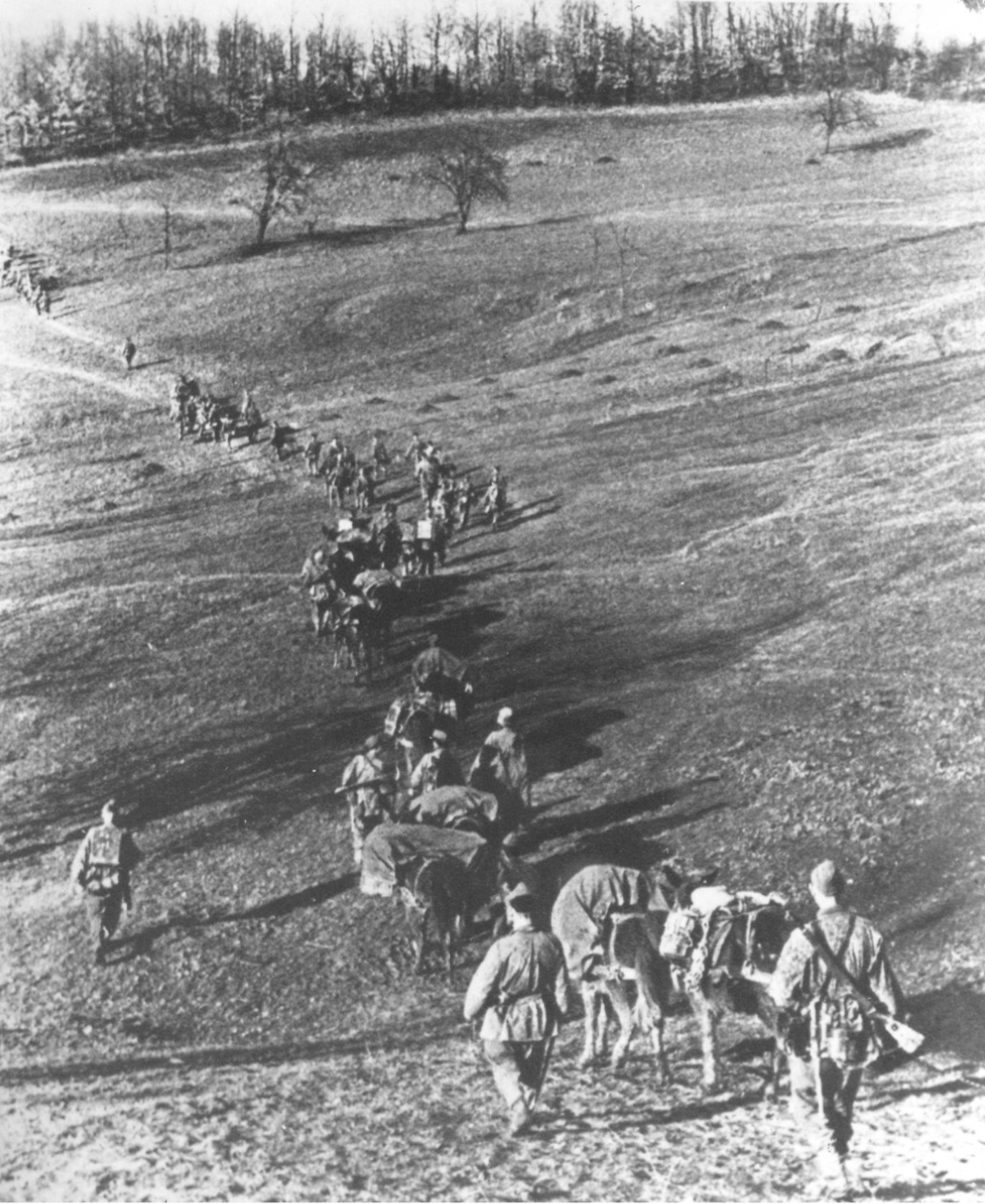
Troops from Prinz Eugen advance across the Han Pijesak Ridge in Bosnia going into action against the 16th and the 17th division of the Yugoslav Partisans, 10 May 1944

In May, June and July, the Prinz Eugen saw further action in Operation Freie Jagd, Operation Rose and Operation Feuerwehr, where it saw actions against, among other units, the 16th Muslim Brigade. Between 12 and 30 August, the division was engaged in Operation Rübezahl, aimed to prevent offensive of NOVJ forces from Montenegro into western Serbia.

In September, the Soviet Red Army had advanced to the Balkans and the division suffered heavy casualties in defensive battles against the combined Bulgarian, Soviet and NOVJ forces in the Nish region. On 21 September, Obergruppenführer Phleps—the division's first commander—was believed to have been killed when en route from Montenegro to Transylvania. The division's next action was the defence of the Kraljevo bridgehead against the Soviet-led Belgrade Offensive as a part of XXXIV Army Corps (Army Corps Müller). This defence was essential for the success of Army Group E efforts to open a corridor which would allow the retreat of 350,000 German soldiers from Greece and the Aegean Sea.

In the beginning of November, the very understrength and underperforming 21st Waffen Mountain Division of the SS Skanderbeg was disbanded, following widespread demoralisation and mass desertions within its ranks. It was nominally ethnic Albanian but in reality staffed mostly with the Reichsdeutsche and Volksdeutsche Germans, including ex-Kriegsmarine conscripts. Its remnants were incorporated into the 14th Regiment of Prinz Eugen, which received its honor title Skanderbeg.

=== 1945 ===
In January 1945, the division was in action against the Yugoslav Partisans at Otok and Vukovar in Croatia. In February, it took part in Operation Wehrwolf against a Yugoslav bridgehead in the Virovitica area.

The withdrawal from Bosnia towards Austria continued as Prinz Eugen retreated through Croatia in April 1945. On 10 May, the division moved towards Celje in Slovenia. There it surrendered to the Yugoslav People's Army on 11 May, three days after the capitulation of Germany that marked the official end to World War II in Europe.

All personnel of Prinz Eugen taken prisoner by the Yugoslav army were then killed. Most were executed wholesale, without trial, disposed of through a variety of methods immediately following their surrender. The killings, which were never punished, were ordered by local Yugoslav commanders, apparently acting directly against Tito's strict instructions to detain the captives in prison camps and screen them for war criminals. In 2010, a large mass grave containing the remains of some 2,000 Prinz Eugen soldiers was opened near the Slovenian village of Brežice; the soldiers had been stripped naked, bound together with telephone wire, and shot, their bodies buried in a trench in a summary mass execution on 22 May 1945. Many of the soldiers' family members were amongst the tens of thousands of local civilians who perished at the hands of Yugoslav forces during the ethnic cleansing of German-speaking populations throughout eastern Europe.

The loss of the division's war diary, likely through intentional destruction, has caused significant gaps in the historiography of both the division itself and the broader Yugoslav campaign.

== War crimes ==
The post-war Nuremberg trials made the declaratory judgement that the Waffen-SS was a criminal organisation due to its major involvement in war crimes and crimes against humanity, including the killing of prisoners-of-war and atrocities committed in occupied countries. Excluded from this judgement were those who were conscripted into the Waffen-SS and had not personally committed war crimes and crimes against humanity.

The division was infamous for its brutality. On 6 August 1946, during the morning session at the Nürnberg Trials, it was said that "The 7th SS Division, Prinz Eugen, is famed for its cruelty," and that "wherever it passed - through Serbia, through Bosnia and Herzegovina, through Lika and Banija or through Dalmatia - everywhere it left behind scenes of conflagration and devastation and the bodies of innocent men, women, and children who had been burned in the houses."

- During late September 1942, members of the SS Prinz Eugen killed 18 Serb civilians in villages on Rogozna mountain. Unit also stole wheat and forced people to work in mines, on roads and railways, regardless of ethnicity.
- The Germans and Bulgarians committed reprisals against the civilian population and burned several villages during their anti-Chetnik Operation Kopaonik during October 1942. The village of Kriva Reka, the location of Keserović's headquarters, suffered the most: 120 civilians were locked in the village church and burned to death by members of the 7th SS Division. In other villages in Kopaonik 300 civilians were killed; in the villages on Mount Goč 250 civilians were executed.
- In villages of Blaževo, Gradac, Bozomina and Domiševine in early December 1942, the unit killed 29 villagers and razed 40 homes. In Brekovo near Arilje, they arrested and executed 11 people after finding illicit weapons in some houses. They burned down municipality seat and few other buildings. A detachment of the SS Prinz Eugen stationed in Topola arrested over 30 citizens, tortured them into admitting to support Partisans and then executed them. Right before transport to the NDH, on January 1, 1943, the SS Prinz Eugen arrested 12 and executed 11 people south of Požega
- Researchers of the Institute of History in Karlovac established a number of 276 civilian inhabitants of Karlovac area, killed by the 7th SS during Operation Weiss I in January 1943. In February, the division, together with the 369th (Croatian) Infantry Division and the 717th Infantry Division, conducted an assault on Grmeč. Some 15,000 civilian inhabitants broke through the enemy lines together with the Partisans, but those left behind were mercilessly killed. Another drama of an attack on a refugee column happened on late February near Resanovci, during Operation Weiss II, resulting in hundreds of victims. According to official post-war investigation, the three divisions were responsible for 3,370 killed civilians, and another 1,722 deported to concentration camps during Operation Weiss.
- In late May and early June 1943, during Operation Schwarz, the division killed a large number of civilians and prisoners of war with assistance from Croatian Ustaše and SS Handschar. Inhabitants from the Bosnian and Serbian villages of Dub, Bukovac, Miljkovac, Duba and Rudinice, and in the Piva area of Montenegro, were all captured, regardless of age or sex, and killed in the village of Doli Pivski. The total number of victims from these villages ranges from around 400 to 522.
- On 12 July in the Bosnian Muslim village of Rotimlja, near Stolac, the 7th SS Division killed 66 civilians, 25 of which were younger than 15. On the same day, other units of the division killed 68 civilians, 36 younger than 15, in the Muslim village of Košutica, near Sokolac.
- During its advancement towards Split, on 17–30 September 1943, the division killed 230 inhabitants of Croatian villages in the Imotski, Sinj and Split areas. After capturing Split, the division executed 48 Italian officers and three generals (General Salvatore Pelligra, commander of the artillery of the XVIII Corps, General Angelo Policardi, commander of the pioneers of the XVIII Corps, and General Alfonso Cigala Fulgosi, commander of the 17th Littoral Brigade). On 5 November, the division executed 25 hostages in Sinj in a retribution for losses.
- The 2nd Battalion of the 14th SS Regiment of the division killed 1,525 civilians on 26–30 March 1944, in the villages near Kamešnica near Split, in an action under command of V SS Corps.
- On 28 July 1944, the division together with the ethnic Albanian SS Skanderbeg, massacred around 550 Serb villagers in the settlement of Velika, in Plav, Montenegro following Operation Draufgänger.

It also committed numerous further atrocities in the area of Nikšić in Montenegro:

Everything they came across they burnt down, they murdered and pillaged. The officers and men of the SS division Prinz Eugen committed crimes of an outrageous cruelty on this occasion. The victims were shot, slaughtered and tortured, or burnt to death in burning houses. Where a victim was found not in his house but on the road or in the fields some distance away, he was murdered and burnt there. Infants with their mothers, pregnant women and frail old people were also murdered. In short, every civilian met with by these troops in these villages was murdered. In many cases, whole families who, not expecting such treatment or lacking the time for escape, had remained quietly in their homes were annihilated and murdered. Whole families were thrown into burning houses in many cases and thus burnt. It has been established from the investigations entered upon that 121 persons, mostly women, and including 30 persons aged 60–92 years and 29 children of ages ranging from 6 months to 14 years, were executed on this occasion in the horrible manner narrated above. The villages [and then follows the list of the villages] were burnt down and razed to the ground. — Dr. Dušan Nedeljković, Yugoslav State Commission, Document D-940.

== Commanders ==
No.	Portrait	Commander	Took office	Left office	Time in office
1	Artur Phleps	SS-Gruppenführer; Artur Phleps (1881–1944)	30 January 1942	15 May 1943	1 year, 105 days
2	Karl von Oberkamp	SS-Brigadeführer; Karl von Oberkamp (1893–1947)	15 May 1943	30 January 1944	260 days
3	Otto Kumm	SS-Brigadeführer; Otto Kumm (1909–2004)	30 January 1944	20 January 1945	356 days
4	August Schmidhuber	SS-Brigadeführer; August Schmidhuber (1901–1947)	20 January 1945	8 May 1945	108 days

Out of the four commanders of the division, one (Phleps) was killed in battle in Romania in 1944, two of them were sentenced to death by hanging and executed in Belgrade in 1947, and the fourth (Kumm) managed to avoid extradition to Yugoslavia by fleeing over the wall of the internment camp of Dachau.

== Awards ==
Several members were decorated with high German military awards, including one Knight's Cross of the Iron Cross with Oaks Leaves and Swords awarded to SS-Brigadeführer und Generalmajor der Waffen-SS Otto Kumm when he was the divisional commander. Divisional recipients of the Knight's Cross of the Iron Cross included the first commander of the division, Artur Phleps and five others, all regimental or battalion commanders. One was awarded posthumously.

== Order of battle ==
=== October 1943 – Croatia ===
- Division Staff
- SS-Volunteer Gebirgsjäger-Regiment 13
- SS-Volunteer Gebirgsjäger-Regiment 14 "Skanderberg"
- SS-Volunteer Gebirgs-Artillerie-Regiment 7
- SS-Volunteer Gebirgs Reconnaissance Battalion (mot) 7
- SS-Panzer Battalion 7
- SS-Panzerjäger Battalion 7
- SS-Gebirgs-Pionier-Battalion 7
- SS-Gebirgs-Flak Battalion 7
- SS-Radfahr-Battalion 7
- SS-Cavalry Battalion 7
- SS-Gebirgs-Signals Battalion 7
- SS-Gebirgs-Reserve Battalion 7
- SS-Medical Battalion 7
- SS-Feldgendarmerie-Troop 7
- SS-Volunteer Gebirgs Veterinary Company 7
- SS-Volunteer Gebirgs War Reporter platoon 7
- SS-Divisions Versorgungs Truppen 7

=== November 1944 – Balkans ===
- Division Staff
- SS-Volunteer-Gebirgsjäger-Regiment 13 Artur Phleps
- SS-Volunteer Gebirgsjäger-Regiment 14 Skanderbeg
- SS-Volunteer Gebrigs Artillery Regiment 7
- SS-Volunteer Gebirgs-Reconnaissance Battalion (mot) 7
- SS-Panzer-Battalion 7
- SS-Gebirgs-Panzerjäger Battalion 7
- SS-Sturmgeschutz Battalion 7
- SS-Gebirgs-Pionier-Battalion 7
- SS-Flak Battalion 7
- SS-Radfahr-Reconnaissance Battalion 7
- SS-Cavalry Battalion 7
- SS-Motorcycle Battalion 7
- SS-Gebirgs-Signals Battalion 7
- SS-Reserve Battalion 7
- SS-Medical Battalion 7
- SS-Volunteer Gebirgs Veterinary Company 7
- SS-Volunteer Gebirgs War Reporter Platoon 7
- SS-Propaganda-Zug
- SS-Feldgendarmerie-Troop 7
- SS-Werkstatt-Company 7
- SS-Nachshub-Company 7
- SS-Reserve Battalion 7
- SS-Wirtschafts-Battalion 7
- SS-Wehrgeologisches-Battalion 7

== Alternative names ==
- Freiwilligen-Gebirgs-Division
- SS-Freiwilligen-Division Prinz Eugen
- SS-Freiwilligen-Gebirgs-Division Prinz Eugen
- 7.SS-Freiwilligen-Gebirgs-Division Prinz Eugen

== See also ==
- List of Waffen-SS divisions
