= Doli Pivski massacre =

Incident in World War 2 in Yugoslavia in 1943

- Part of World War II in Yugoslavia
- Location: Doli Pivski, Montenegro
- Date: 7 June 1943
- Target: Serbs
- Attack type: Mass killings
- Deaths: 522
- Perpetrators: 7th SS Volunteer Mountain Division Prinz Eugen; Ustaše
- Motive: Reprisal; Anti-Serb sentiment

The Doli Pivski massacre was the mass killing of 522 Serb civilians by the 7th SS Volunteer Mountain Division Prinz Eugen, along with Croatian Ustaše on 7 June 1943 in the village of Doli Plivski, Montenegro, near the border of Bosnia and Herzegovina during World War II.

The massacre occurred during a joint attack by Axis forces against Yugoslav Partisans codenamed Operation Schwarz. Inhabitants of the Bosnian and Serbian villages of Dub, Bukovac, Miljkovac, Duba and Rudinci, and in the Piva area of Montenegro were captured and taken to the village of Doli Plivski where they were shot and killed or burned alive in houses. 109 of the victims were children. Entire families were anhilated. According to the Montenegrin newspaper Vijesti, children were killed first so that the elderly could watch the death of the youngest. In one sinkhole, 107 children and a mother who was giving birth at that time were killed within a minute.

In 1977, the Yugoslav government built a memorial site in Doli Pivski. An Orthodox church was constructed in 2004. In 2017, the Serbian Orthodox Church proclaimed the victims of the massacre as martyrs. A girl who ran into a burning house in order to die alongside her family was given the title of "Holy Martyr Jaglika Pivska".
