= Borozan =

Origin
- Language: Serbo-Croatian
- Meaning: "trumpeter"

Other names
- Variant form: Borozanović

Borozan (Serbian Cyrillic: Борозан) is a Serbian-Montenegrin and Croatian, surname, meaning "trumpeter". The etymology of the word is Ottoman Turkish, from the native Turkish boru ("pipe", "tube", "trumpet", "bugle") and the Persian suffix -zen or -zan denoting one who plays an instrument.

People named Borozan include:

- Vuko Borozan (born 1994), Montenegrin handball player
- Ranko Borozan (1933–2020), former Yugoslav footballer

== Anthropology ==
- The Borozan brotherhood in Ceklin (in Montenegro), according to tradition, originate from a ban Radivoj, which is supported from a document dating to 1609. The Borozani and Lompari of Ceklin are related, claiming the same ancestor, who is believed to have settled in Bokovo from Strugare, originally from Burovik. The brotherhood has the slava of Đurđic (St. George). A Borozan family settled in Cetinje in 1807.
- A Borozan family was among the ktetors (donators) to the building (1847–51) of the Church of St. Nicholas in Kumanovo (in R. Macedonia).
- A Borozan brotherhood headed by brothers Đuro, Stojan and Uroš who together had 18 children lived in Mostar (in Bosnia and Herzegovina) during World War II; most of the family were killed by the Ustasha.
- A Borozan brotherhood lived in Košutica and Borova (in Leposavić, Kosovo) prior to World War II.
