= Operation Kugelblitz =

Axis operation during WWII

- Part of World War II in Yugoslavia
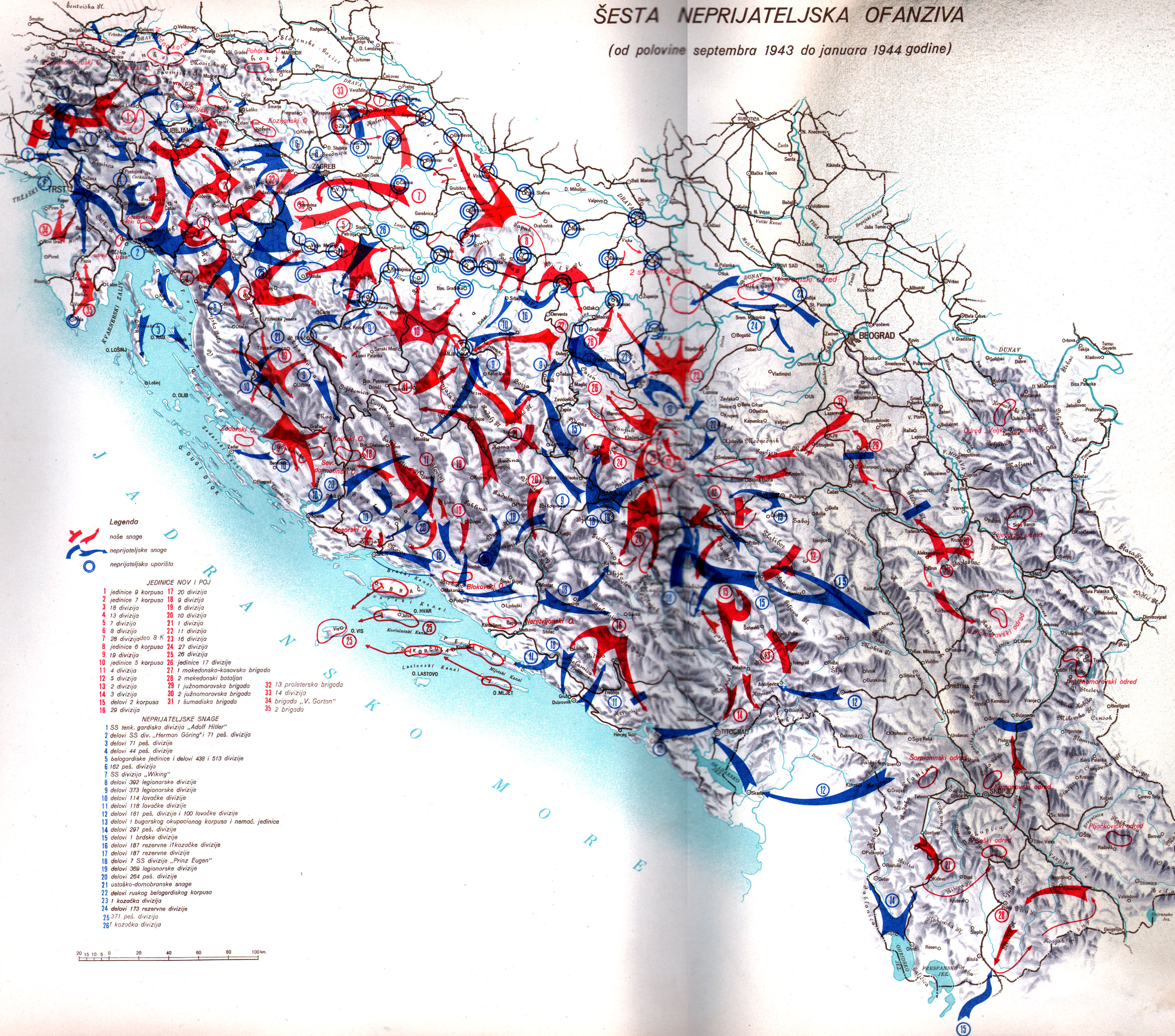
- Map of Partisan movements during the offensive
Date	3 December 1943 – 15 February 1944
Location	Independent State of Croatia (modern day Bosnia and Herzegovina)
Result	German failure

Belligerents
Axis and collaborationist forces: Germany; Croatia; Chetniks	Yugoslav Partisans

Commanders and leaders
(Nazi Germany) Alexander Löhr (Nazi Germany) Lothar Rendulic (Nazi Germany) Artur Phleps (Nazi Germany) Karl von Oberkamp (Nazi Germany) August Schmidhuber (Chetniks) Vojislav Lukačević	(Yugoslav Partisans) Peko Dapčević

Strength
c. 30,000 German, NDH, and Chetnik troops	c. Around 12,000 troops

Casualties and losses
6,700 casualties	9,000 casualties

Operation Kugelblitz (German: Unternehmen Kugelblitz) was a massive counter-insurgency operation by the German 2nd Panzer Army conjunction with collaborationist forces against the Yugoslav Partisans around the eastern Bosnian region of the Independent State of Croatia during World War II. Launched on 3 December 1943, the objective of Kugelblitz was to encircle and destroy Partisan positions around the eastern part of the NDH, who were planning to regroup in occupied Serbia. The events of Operation Kugelblitz are associated with the Sixth Enemy Offensive (Serbo-Croatian: Šesta neprijateljska ofenziva).

The operation was divided in two phases as dictated by the codename Kugelblitz (German: Ball Lightning). The first phase (Ball) was to quickly overwhelm and encircle enemy forces and the second phase (Lightning) was to destroy the Partisans. The ground forces consisted of Wehrmacht and Waffen SS divisions, particularly the 2nd Panzer Army and the 7th SS Volunteer Mountain Division Prinz Eugen in addition to Home Guard forces of the NDH and Chetniks. The Axis were able to recapture Tuzla and Bihać, but the Partisans were able to avoid encirclement despite heavy casualties. Several factors to the failure of the operation included the swift maneuvers of the Partisan forces and fierce resistance around the region.

== Battle ==
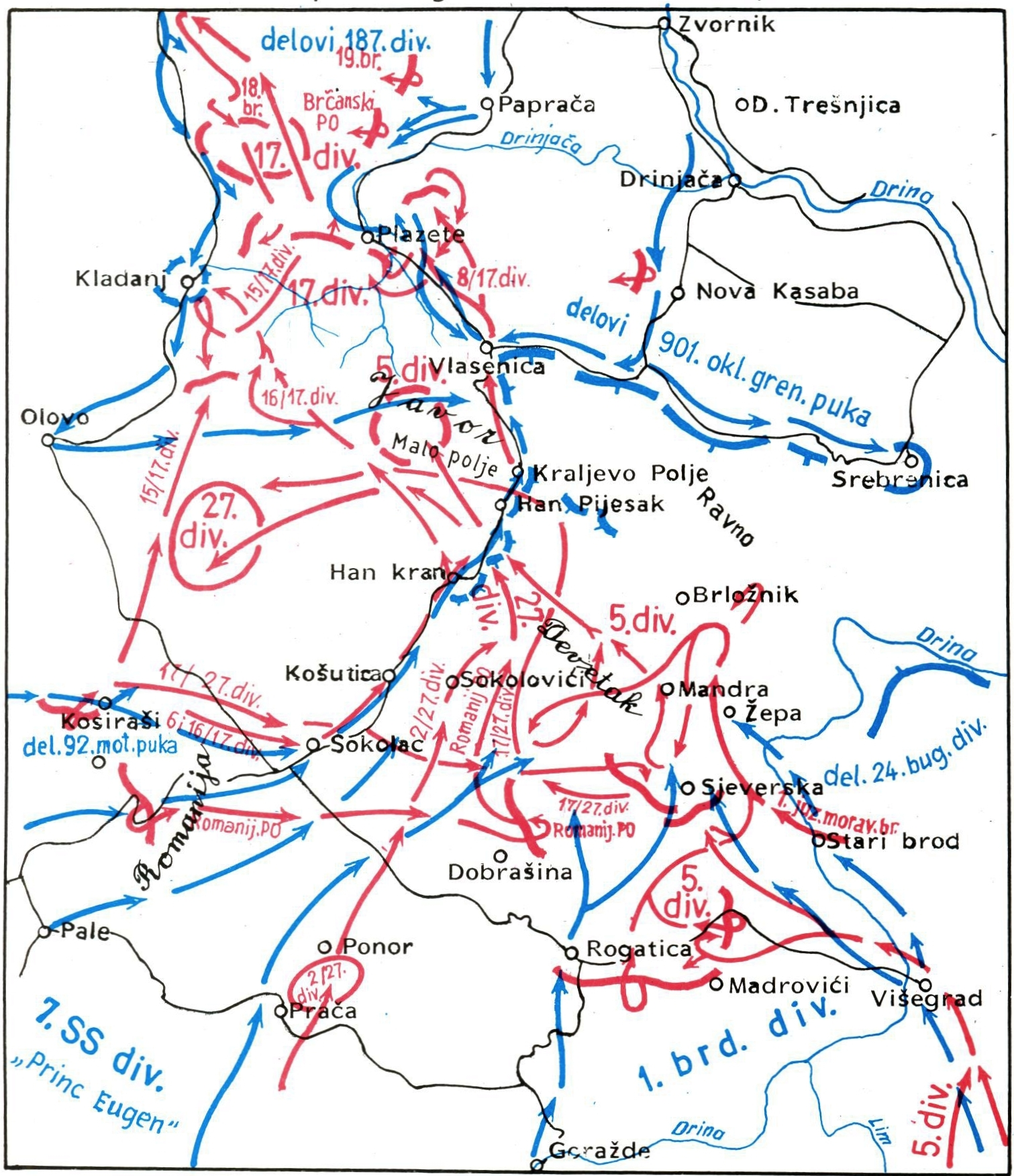
Map of the initial operation of Kugelblitz in eastern Bosnia, 3-15 December 1943

=== Operation Kugelblitz ===
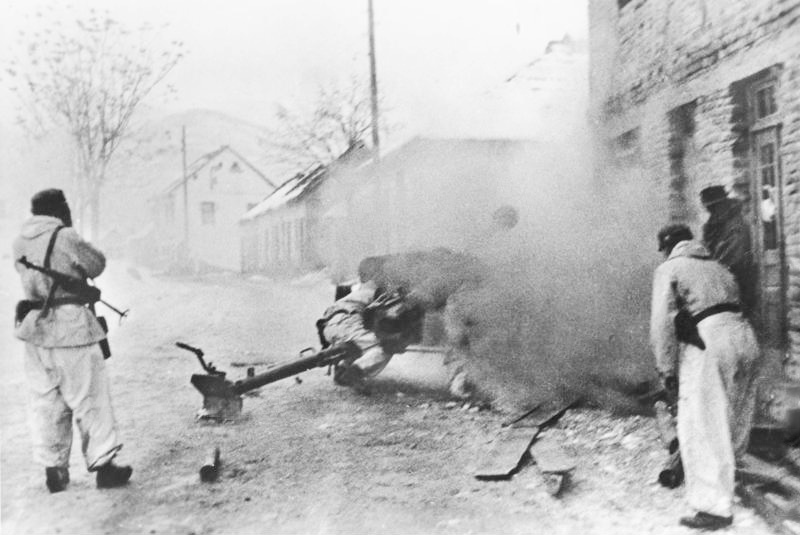
German gun-crew from the 1. Gebirgs-Division fire their 7.5 cm Pak 40 at remaining pockets of insurgents in a village in eastern Bosnia, December 1943

Operation Kugelblitz, the first of the two offensives, was executed by the 5th SS Mountain Corps. The aim of this operation was to dismantle and consequently destroy Partisan units in eastern Bosnia. The operation ultimately was unsuccessful because the German forces were unable to completely destroy all the Partisan troops. Because of the terrain, large area, and lack of Axis manpower to adequately cover the encirclement, Partisan forces evaded complete destruction by slipping through large gaps in the narrowing encirclement. However, the Partisans still suffered severe casualties.

=== Operation Schneesturm ===
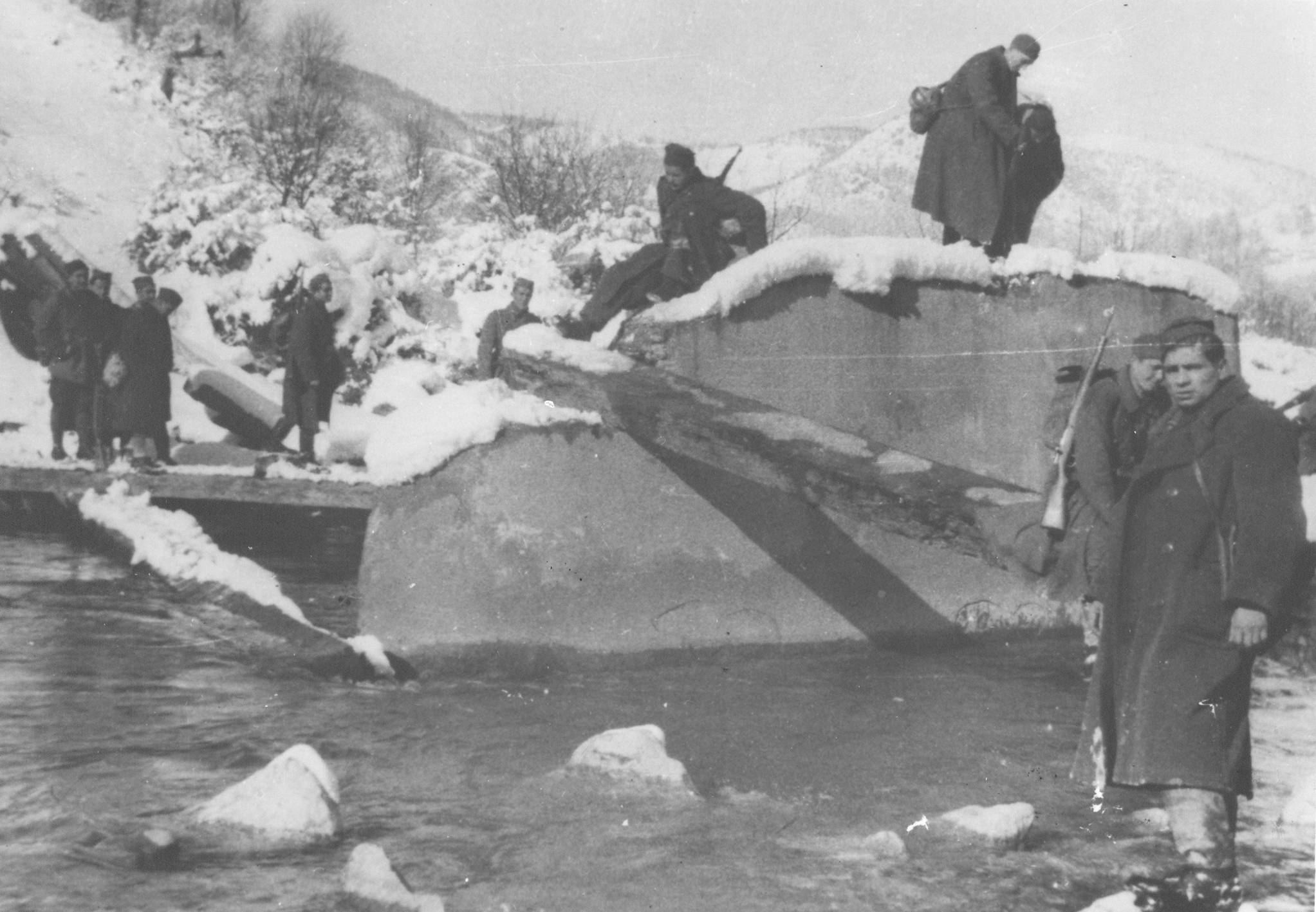
Yugoslav partisans of the 16th Muslim Brigade crossing the Drinjača, December 1943

Operation Schneesturm was initiated immediately upon the completion of Operation Kugelblitz. This operation included twin drives from the Bosnia area. One drive headed westwards towards the Adriatic Sea. The other headed to the northwest and towards the border with Italy. While this operation ended late in December and the Partisans once again survived, the cost was high. The Partisans suffered about 2,000 additional casualties. Although badly battered, the majority of the Partisan units retained their cohesion. Tito's army, in the opinion of some, could still be considered an effective fighting force.

== Results ==
Such in general outline was the sixth offensive on liberated territory in Yugoslavia. The fact that British observers were by this time plentiful on the ground meant that the fighting was adequately reported abroad—as it had never been before—and the conclusion of the campaign coincided with a great wave of publicity for the partisans in England and the United States.

— Basil Davidson

For the Germans their sixth offensive was entirely inconclusive. They had failed to do more than merely interrupt the free development of the resistance movement, and although they burnt large numbers of villages and killed whomever they laid hands on they scarcely reduced the numbers of those who were fighting, and they laid the basis, indeed, for a great increase in those numbers. No reliable estimates of partisan casualties are available; and similarly it is impossible to do more than guess at German casualties. The only statement that can be made without fear of contradiction is that the ratio was heavily in favour of the partisans.

— Basil Davidson

== Gallery ==
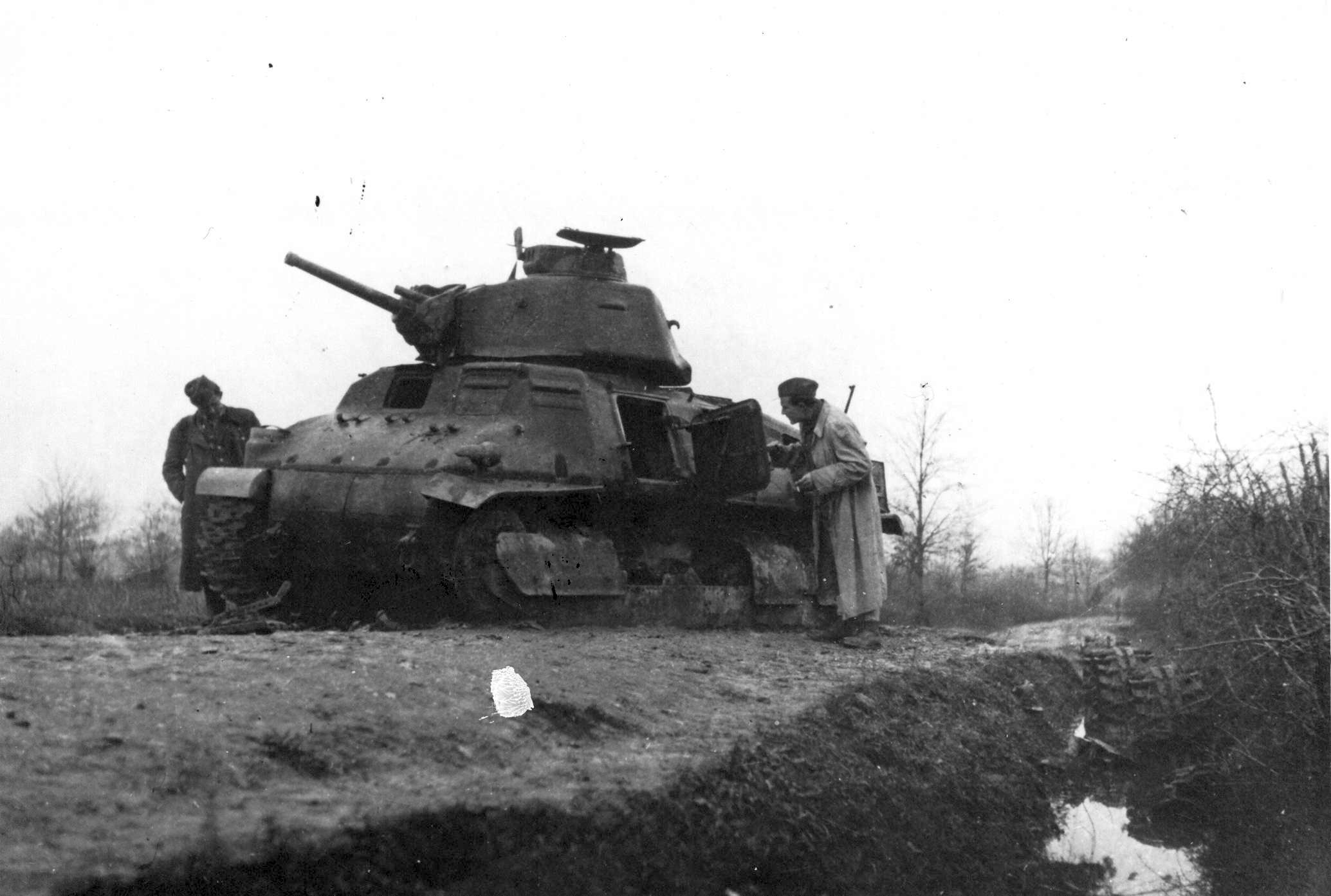
A German Beute tank (Somua S35) knocked out in operations in eastern Bosnia is inspected by partisans, December 1943

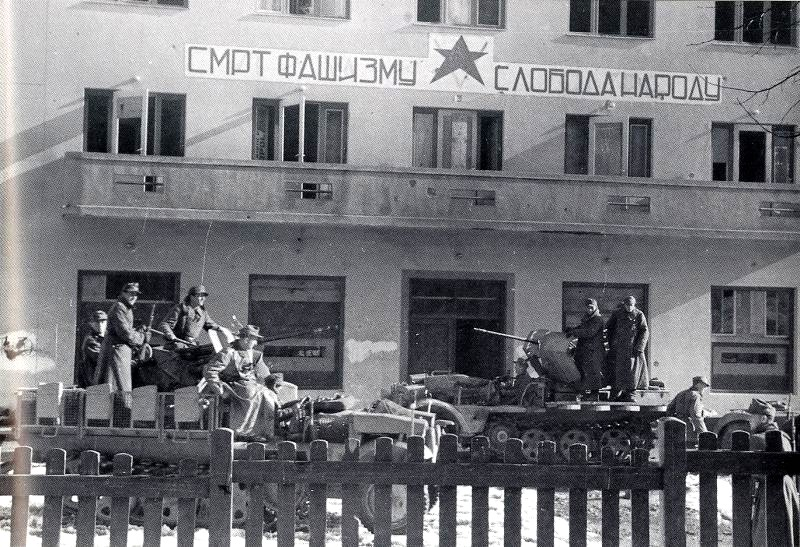
Shortly before Operation Kugelblitz, 11 November 1943 German troops of the 1. Gebirgs-Division mounted on (flak armed) half-tracks in front of the former partisan HQ (Hotel "Čajniče") in Tuzla after the city's capture. The partisan slogan "Death to fascism – freedom to the people" is written on the hotel facade.

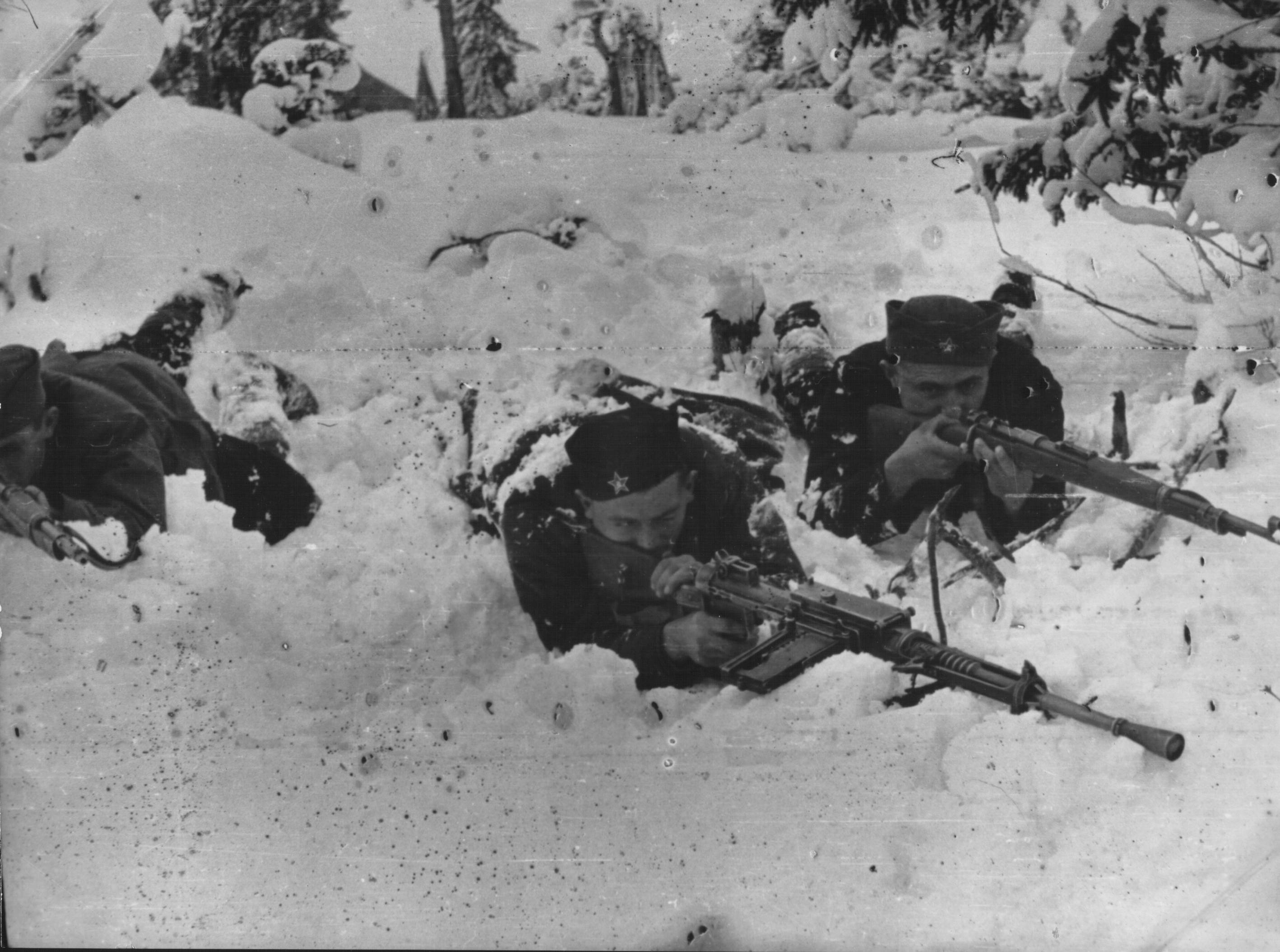
Fighters of the 4th Battalion of the 3rd Sandžak Brigade fighting with the Germans near Prijepolje during the counter-insurgency, late 1943

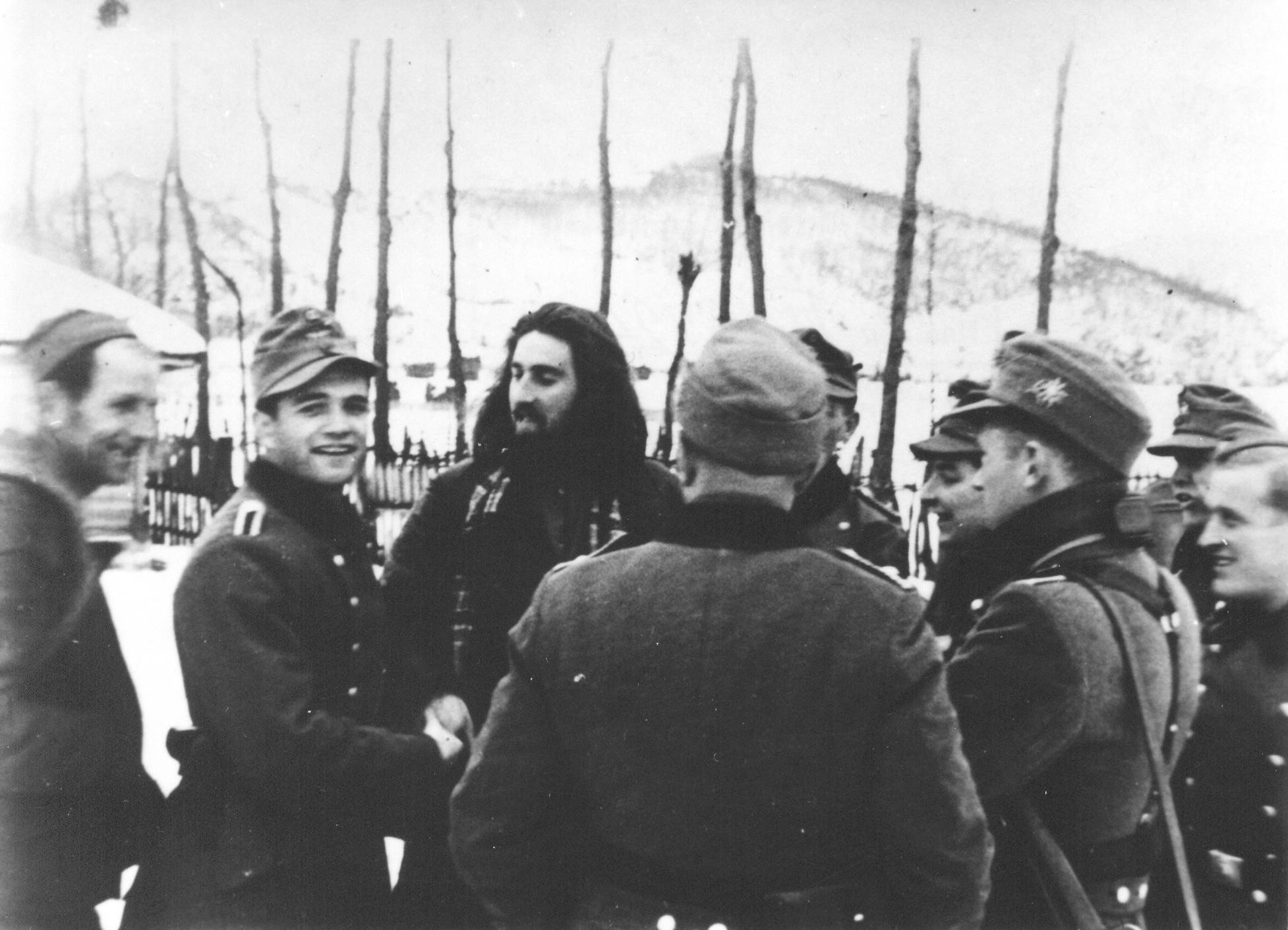
Chetnik leader Stevan Damjanović conversing with German mountain troops during the operations

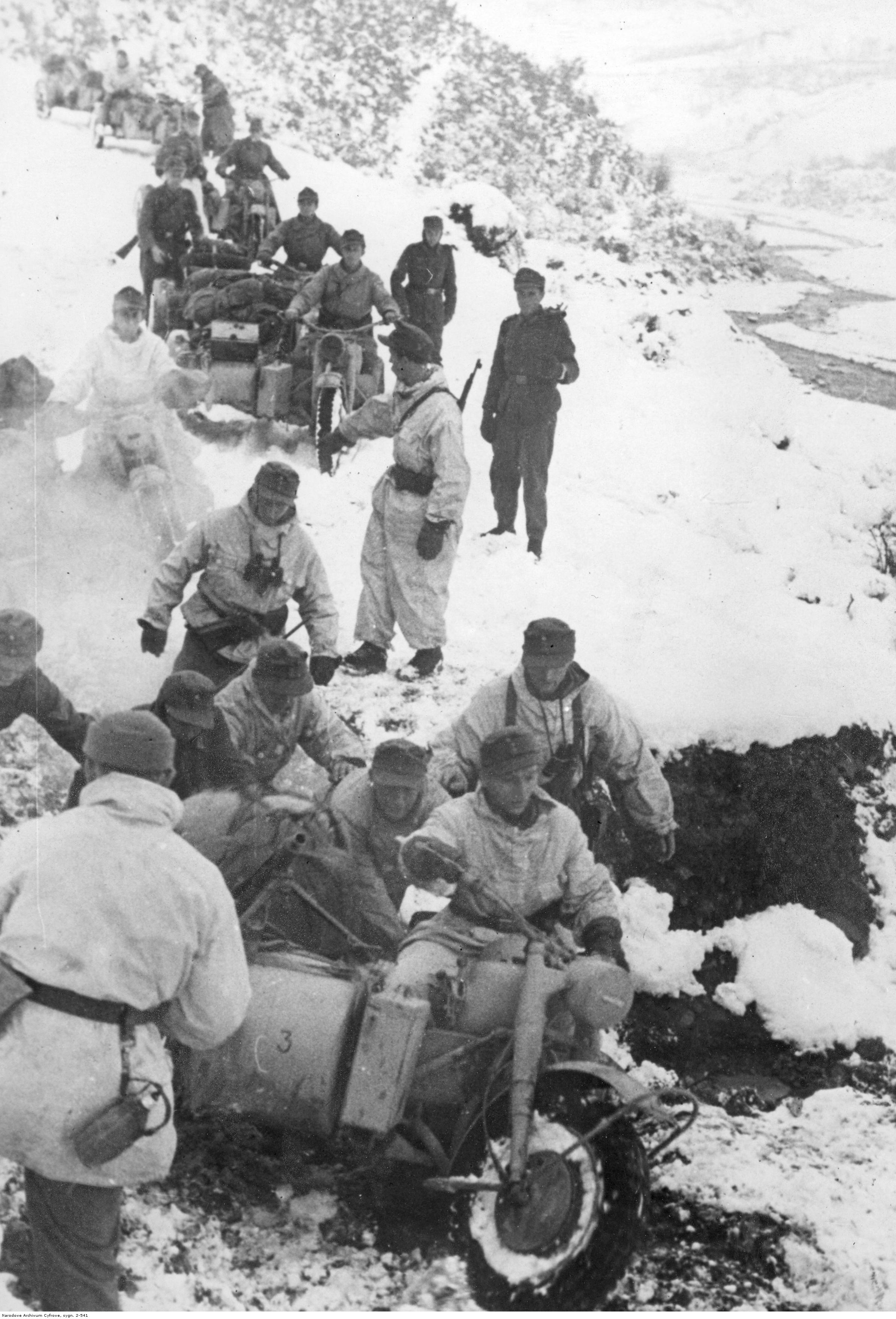
German motocycles traverse rough terrain during 'Kugelblitz'

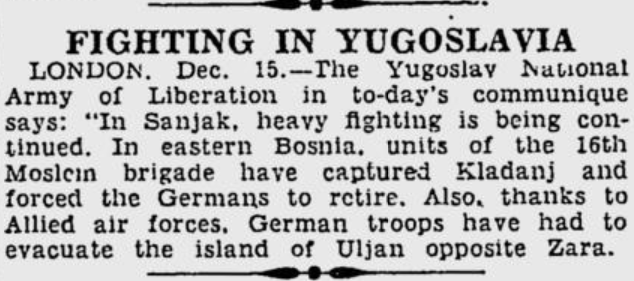
A December 15, 1943 London News Report on the capture of Kladanj by the 16th Muslim Brigade of the Yugoslav partisans from the Germans during Operation 'Kugelblitz', as published in The Indian Express

== Sources ==
- Davidson, Basil (1946). Partisan Picture. Bedford: Bedford Books Ltd.

== See also ==
- Military history of Bulgaria during World War II
- Seven anti-Partisan offensives
- Resistance during World War II
- Anti-partisan operations in World War II
