= Operation Gama =

- Part of World War II in Yugoslavia
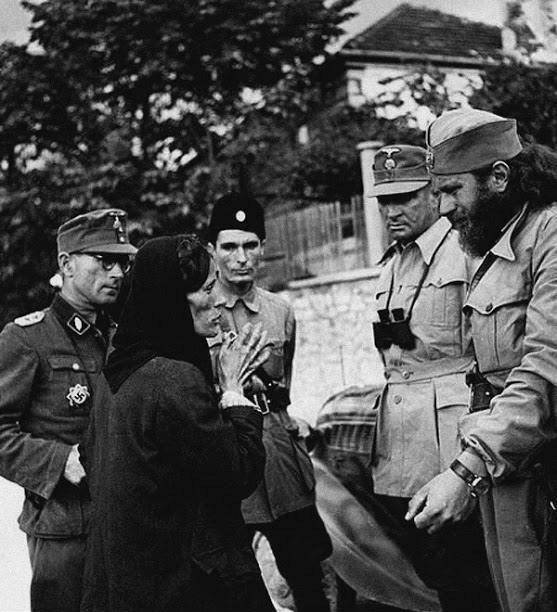
- August Schmidhuber, commander of 7th SS division, Todor Perović, doctor of Trebinja Corps, unknown German officer and Milorad Vidačič commander of Trebinja Corps during Operation Gama.
Date	17 August–19 September 1943.
Location	Eastern Herzegovina, Independent State of Croatia
Result	Tactical Axis victory

Belligerents
Nazi Germany: (Schutzstaffel) Waffen-SS; Chetniks; Kingdom of Italy	Yugoslav Partisans

Commanders and leaders
(Schutzstaffel) August Schmidhuber (Chetniks) Milorad Vidačić (Chetniks) Petar Samardžić	(Yugoslav Partisans) Vlado Šegrt

Units involved
7th SS Volunteer Mountain Division Prinz Eugen; Trebinje Corps; Nevesinje Chetniks (Kingdom of Italy) 18th Infantry Division "Messina" (Kingdom of Italy) 32nd Infantry Division "Marche"; Croatian Home Guard	(Yugoslav Partisans) 10th Herzegovina brigade

The Operation Gama was a joint Axis operation against the Yugoslav Partisans and their sympathisers in eastern Herzegovina from August to September 1943.

== Operation ==
On 17 August 1943 two battalions of 7th SS division, five battalions of Italian divisions "Messina" and "Marche", one battalion of Croatian Home Guard and three brigades of Chetnik Trebinja Corps started operation in Herzegovina with aim of encircling and destroying 10th Herzegovina brigade. According to monthly report of the 7th SS division in Nevesinje, Petar Samardžić collaborated with Germans against the Partisans. The Chetniks were proven to be reliable in fightings against the Partisans. In Gacko 7th SS division recruited around 150 local Chetniks to fight the Partisans. Either in 18 or 19 September Axis managed to temporarily encircle 10th Herzegovina brigade around Bileća, however Herzegovina brigade managed to retreat towards Gacko. On 18 September 1,200 Partisans were advancing towards Bileća from the north, but were driven back by German forces and 800 Chetniks.
