= Jaglika Adžić =

Saint Jaglika of Piva Јаглика Пивска
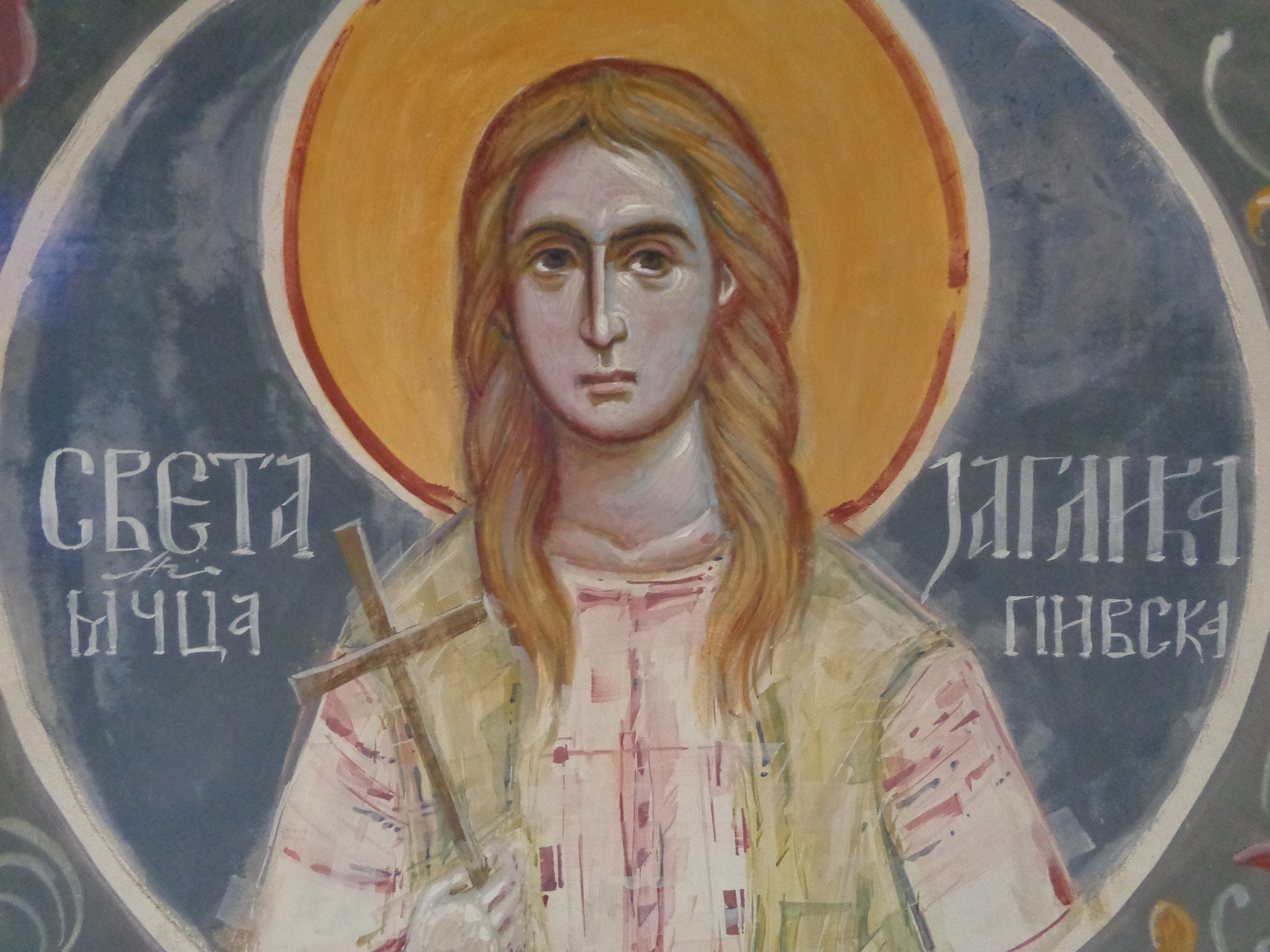
- Fresco at the chapel next to the Church of St. Jovan Vladimir, Bar

New Martyr
- Born: 1926; Plužine, Kingdom of Yugoslavia
- Died: 6 June 1943; Plužine, Italian governorate of Montenegro
- Venerated in: Eastern Orthodox Church
- Feast: 28 July [O.S. 15 July]
- Attributes: Martyr's cross, traditional Serbian clothing, not wearing a veil

Jaglika Adžić (1926 in Gojkovića dol, Plužine, Montenegro, then Kingdom of Yugoslavia – 6 June 1943 in Gojkovića dol) was a Serbian girl who was canonised as a saint by the Serbian Orthodox Church in 2017.

She was born as the second of eight children. She was baptized by the priest of Piva, the martyr Jovan Sočica. In Plužine, in Gojkovića dola 7th SS Volunteer Mountain Division Prinz Eugen, which was composed of Germans and Ustashi, on 6 June 1943, burned 60 citizens of Pivlja in a hut. Among them were Jaglika's parents, Stoja and Krsto, and brothers - two-year-old Dušan, two-year-old Momčilo and eight-year-old Milorad. Jaglika was in a group of people from Pivlja who managed to escape and reach the forest, but when she heard the cries of her brothers, she returned and tried to join her family and the other victims. According to the testimony, the German officer ordered two soldiers to hold her hands and not allow her to enter the burning hut, having other intentions with her. She broke free and jumped into the fire. At the entrance to Plužine, the place where the tragedy happened, there is a plaque placed by SUBNOR Plužine.

A kindergarten in Plužine is named after her, and a street in Podgorica is named after her.

== See also ==
- Doli Pivski massacre
