= Rommel offensive =

WWII German offensive against Partisan forces in 1943

Rommel Offensive
- Part of World War II in Yugoslavia, Seven enemy offensives and Operation Achse
- Photo of Erwin Rommel, commander of Army Group B. The German High Command ordered him to destroy the Yugoslav Partisan units in Istria.
| Date | 22 September–October 1943 |
| Location | Slovene Littoral, Istria, the Croatian Littoral, Gorski Kotar, the Province of Ljubljana, and Žumberak |
| Result | German victory: Mass reprisals against the population in Istria; Brutal suppression of the Slovene Partisan uprising; Many villages in Istria are burned or destroyed |
| Territorial changes | German forces and their allies captured Istria |

Belligerents
| Germany; Croatia | (Yugoslav Partisans) Croatian Partisans (Yugoslav Partisans) Slovene Partisans |

Commanders and leaders
| (Nazi Germany) Adolf Hitler (Nazi Germany) Erwin Rommel (Nazi Germany) Paul Hausser | Unknown |

Units involved
| (Nazi Germany) Army Group B: (Schutzstaffel) II SS Panzer Corps; 44th Infantry Division; 71st Infantry Division; 1st Fallschirm-Panzer Division Hermann Göring; 1st SS Panzer Division Leibstandarte SS Adolf Hitler (Independent State of Croatia) 2nd Ustaše Battalion | (Yugoslav Partisans) 1st Istrian Brigade (Yugoslav Partisans) 2nd Istrian Brigade (Yugoslav Partisans) Učka NOP detachment (Yugoslav Partisans) Pula NOP detachment (Yugoslav Partisans) Pazin–Poreč NOP detachment (Yugoslav Partisans) Sušak-Kastav NOP detachment Battalion "Garibaldi" |

Strength
| 50,000 soldiers 150 tanks | 15,000 soldiers |

Casualties and losses
| Unknown | 4,096 Partisans killed and 6,850 captured (Early German reports); 2,000 Partisans killed (later reports) |
- 2,000 civilians killed in reprisals

The Rommel Offensive was a German offensive against Partisan forces in Istria and Slovenia, led by general Erwin Rommel, commander of Army Group B.Following the Italian capitulation in September 1943, Army Group B under Field Marshal Erwin Rommel launched a large-scale autumn offensive to crush the Partisan uprising and re-establish German control over Istria and the northern Adriatic coast. The campaign included Operation Istrien in Istria as well as Operation Wolkenbruch (Downpour), which drove Partisan forces from the northern Adriatic coast. It is also known as the October Offensive, as it was carried out in October 1943. The objective of the operation was to reoccupy the free territory and suppress the mass uprising in the Slovene Littoral, Istria, the Croatian Littoral, Gorski Kotar, the Province of Ljubljana, and Žumberak, to seize ports on the northern Adriatic coast (and prevent a possible Allied landing), and to secure communications between northern Italy and the Balkans.

The operation was conducted in several phases, from 24 September to 12 November 1943:

- Phase I: Slovene Littoral (24 September – October)
- Phase II: Istria (24 September – 15 October)
- Phase III: Kvarner and Gorski Kotar
- Phase IV (15 October – 12 November): Žumberak, Dolenjska and Notranjska.

There are differing interpretations regarding the scope of this offensive. Some sources refer to all four phases as Wolkenbruch, while others apply the name only to the first phase.

In Yugoslav historiography, the Rommel Offensive is considered part of the Sixth Enemy Offensive.

== Background ==
=== Disarmament of Italian forces and rise of the partisans ===
The Italian capitulation was used to disarm Italian occupation forces operating in Slovenia. The People's Liberation Army in Slovenia seized large quantities of weapons, equipment, ammunition, and explosives. Italian units, such as the infantry divisions "Isonzo" and "Macerata", were disarmed by Slovene Partisans, and the soldiers were respectfully sent back to Italy. This act not only strengthened the Partisan military position but also represented a moral victory over the Fascist occupier.

During this process, the Partisan movement in Slovenia experienced rapid growth. The liberated territories expanded to cover nearly half of Slovenia. These territories connected with liberated areas in Croatia, including Istria and Gorski Kotar, enabling coordination between units of the People's Liberation Army and the bodies of the Liberation Front of the Slovene Nation.

=== Mass uprising ===
News of Italy's capitulation triggered a mass uprising among the Slovene population, especially in the Slovene Littoral, which had been under Italian occupation since the 1920s. This uprising was the result of long-term political activity by the Communist Party of Slovenia and the Liberation Front. It enabled a rapid increase in the combat capabilities of Partisan units in these areas.

Slovene Home Guard and Chetniks, collaborationist formations that had cooperated with the Italians, suffered severe defeats after the capitulation. Without Italian support, many of these units were disarmed or destroyed, while the remaining fighters aligned themselves with German occupation authorities, further compromising their position among the population.

=== German reaction ===
The German occupiers, although prepared in advance for the capitulation of their ally Italy, were unable to quickly compensate for the loss. They managed to secure control over key communication lines, such as railway routes leading from Slovenia to Italy. However, due to insufficient forces, their control was limited to certain and transport routes.

In Italian-held parts of Slovenia, such as the Province of Ljubljana, German forces encountered strong Partisan resistance. As a result, Germany had to rely on local collaborationist elements, but without the ability to establish full control, as was the case in northern regions (Upper Carniola and Styria).

Given this situation, the Germans decided to launch large-scale operations in the northwestern part of Yugoslavia in order to suppress the uprising in the Slovene Littoral, destroy Partisan forces in Istria, the Croatian Littoral and Gorski Kotar, secure communications through the Slovene Littoral and the province of Ljubljana, seize ports and cities on the northern Adriatic coast from Trieste to Crikvenica, and prevent a possible Allied landing on the northern Adriatic. The order was issued personally by Adolf Hitler:

I expect that the enemy will direct its main operation from Italy, and at a given moment also with partial forces from Africa, toward the Southeast area. However, it is still unclear whether the opponent will advance from southern Italy, which it has occupied, toward Albania, Montenegro, southern Croatia, or whether it will first attempt to push German forces further north in Italy, thereby creating in central Italy a base for an attack on northern Croatia and Istria.

— Hitler's order of 4 October 1943 to the Commander Southeast and Army Group "B" for organizing the defense of Italy, Istria and Slovenia.

== Offensive in Istria and the Slovene Littoral ==
After bringing in the II SS Panzer Corps from Italy on 22 September, the Germans launched Operation "Wolkenbruch" in the northwestern part of Yugoslavia. From Gorizia, Monfalcone and Trieste, reinforced German forces of the II SS Panzer Corps began the first phase of the operation, aiming to destroy units of the Primorska Operational Zone of the NOV and PO of Slovenia by advancing across the Karst and the Vipava Valley.

In fierce fighting until 30 September, the Partisan units withdrew mainly to the Trnovo Forest Plateau, while superior German forces established strongpoints in the Vipava Valley and on the Karst. Elements of the 1st SS Panzer Division Leibstandarte SS Adolf Hitler, the 44th and 71st Infantry Divisions, and the Panzer Division "Hermann Göring" advanced on 2 October along the following routes: Trieste—Poreč—Rovinj—Pula—Pazin, Hrpelje—Buzet—Roč—Lupoglav, and Trieste—Rijeka, encompassing Vodice, Mune and Žejane.

== Outcome ==
The newly formed Istrian units, composed entirely of newly mobilized fighters, were unable to withstand elite German divisions. In seven days of fighting in early October, the Istrian units were scattered and suffered over 2,000 killed.

== Literature ==
- Zdravko Klanjšček, THE NATIONAL LIBERATION WAR IN SLOVENIA 1941–1945
- Petar Kleut: ELEVENTH CORPS OF THE NOVJ, Military Publishing and Newspaper Center, Belgrade, 1987.
- Giron, Antun (2004). Western Croatia in the Second World War (PDF). Rijeka: Adamić. ISBN 953-219-189-5.
