= Otto Kumm =

German Waffen-SS general (1909–2004)

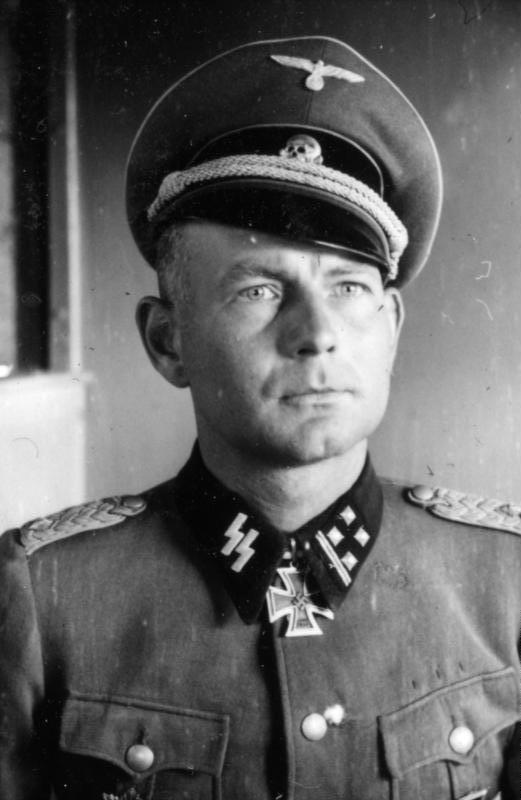
- Born: 1 October 1909; Hamburg, German Empire
- Died: 23 March 2004 (aged 94); Offenburg, Germany
- Military career
- Allegiance: Nazi Germany
- Branch: Waffen-SS
- Service years: 1934–1945
- Rank: Brigadeführer and Generalmajor of the Waffen-SS
- Commands: SS Division Prinz Eugen; SS Division Leibstandarte
- Conflicts: World War II: Operation Spring Awakening
- Awards: Knight's Cross of the Iron Cross with Oak Leaves and Swords
- Other work: Founder of HIAG

Otto Kumm (1 October 1909 – 23 March 2004) was a German military officer who commanded two Waffen-SS divisions in the latter stages of World War II and was a recipient of the Knight's Cross of the Iron Cross with Oak Leaves and Swords. At the post-war Nuremberg trials, the Waffen-SS – of which Kumm was a senior officer – was declared to be a criminal organisation due to its major involvement in war crimes and crimes against humanity. After the war, Kumm became one of the founders of HIAG, a lobby group and a revisionist organization of former Waffen-SS members.

== SS career ==
Born in 1909 into a family of a merchant in Hamburg, Kumm trained as a typesetter and worked at a newspaper. On 1 June 1934, Kumm joined the SS-Verfügungstruppe (SS Dispositional Troops) and on 1 July received his first training with the SS-Standarte "Germania" in Hamburg.

Kumm commanded the Der Führer Regiment of the SS Division Das Reich from July 1941 to April 1943. This regiment was nearly destroyed in the Soviet offensive of January 1942, when it was reduced to 35 men out of the 2,000 that had started the campaign in June 1941. Kumm was a commander of the SS Division Prinz Eugen from 30 January 1944 until 20 January 1945 and then was appointed the new division commander of the SS Division Leibstandarte (LSSAH) as of 15 February 1945, after the division's commander Wilhelm Mohnke was wounded.

As the division commander, Kumm and the LSSAH took part in Operation Spring Awakening (6 March 1945 – 16 March 1945), the last major German offensive launched during World War II. The Germans launched attacks in Hungary near the Lake Balaton area on the Eastern Front. Soviet intelligence identified large German tank formations in western Hungary and developed a successful counterattack strategy. After the failure of Operation Spring Awakening, Sepp Dietrich's 6th SS Panzer Army and the LSSAH retreated to the Vienna area.

After Vienna fell to the Red Army in the Vienna Offensive, the bulk of the LSSAH division surrendered to U.S. forces in the Steyr area on 8 May 1945. Kumm was held at the Dachau internment camp administered by the US Army. Kumm avoided extradition to Yugoslavia to stand trial for war crimes by fleeing over the wall of the camp.

== Activities within HIAG ==
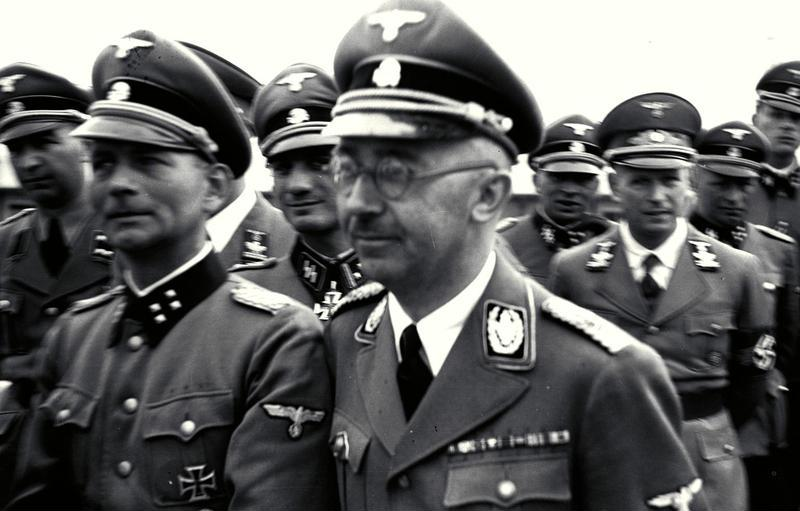
Otto Kumm (front row, left), Heinrich Himmler with other SS officers and Nazi Party leaders during a tour of Mauthausen-Gusen concentration camp, June 1941

After the war, Otto Kumm was "denazified" and became a businessman. Kumm was a founder and the first head of the Waffen-SS veterans' organization HIAG, established in 1951 to lobby for the cause of the Waffen-SS historical rehabilitation and restoration of their rights to post-war pensions.

As the organization's chairman and its first spokesperson, Kumm set the tone for the rhetoric that was reflected in its publications and public discourse. In 1952, Otto Kumm published an editorial in the in-house magazine Wiking-Ruf ("Viking Call") outlining the organization's grievances:

Even during the war, and especially after the war, infamous and lying propagandists have been able to make use of all the unfortunate events connected to the Third Reich and also with the SS to destroy and drag through the mud all of what was and is sacred to us. [...] Let us be clear about it: the [Allied] battle was directed not only against the authoritarian regime of the Third Reich, but, above all, against the resurgence of the strength of the German people.

At least through the 1970s, Kumm remained "the ever unreformed Nazi enthusiast" according to researcher Danny S. Parker, who was given access to the previously closed HIAG archives. Perceived by the West German government to be a Nazi organization, HIAG was disbanded in 1992. Kumm died on 23 March 2004, last of the SS general officers.

== Works ==
- Vorwärts, Prinz Eugen! Geschichte der 7. SS-Freiwilligen-Division "Prinz Eugen" ("Forward, Prinz Eugen! History of the 7th SS Volunteer Division Prinz Eugen"). (2007) Dresden, Germany: Winkelried Verlag. ISBN 978-3-938392-13-3.
- 7. SS-Gebirgs-Division "Prinz Eugen" im Bild ("7th SS Mountain Division Prinz Eugen in Action"). (1983) Osnabrück, Germany: Munin Verlag. ISBN 3-921242-54-1

== Awards ==
- Iron Cross (1939) 2nd Class (30 May 1940) & 1st Class (3 June 1940)
- German Cross in Gold on 29 November 1941 as SS-Obersturmbannführer in the SS-Regiment "Der Führer"
- Knight's Cross of the Iron Cross with Oak Leaves and Swords
  - Knight's Cross on 16 February 1942 as SS-Obersturmbannführer and commander of SS-Regiment (motorized) "Der Führer".
  - Oak Leaves on 6 April 1943 as SS-Obersturmbannführer and commander SS-Panzergrenadier-Regiment "Der Führer"
  - Swords on 17 March 1945 as SS-Brigadeführer and Generalmajor of the Waffen-SS and commander of the 7. SS-Freiwilligen-Gebirgs-Division "Prinz Eugen"

Military offices
Preceded by SS-Brigadeführer Karl Reichsritter von Oberkamp	Commander of 7th SS Volunteer Mountain Division Prinz Eugen; 30 January 1944 – 20 January 1945	Succeeded by SS-Brigadeführer August Schmidthuber
Preceded by SS-Brigadeführer Wilhelm Mohnke	Commander of 1st SS Division Leibstandarte SS Adolf Hitler; 6 February 1945 – 8 May 1945	Succeeded by none
