= August Schmidhuber =

Waffen-SS commander and war criminal (1901–1947)

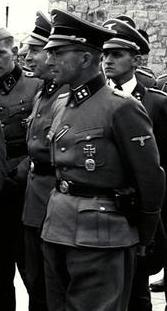
- Schmidhuber in 1941
- Born: 8 May 1901; Augsburg, Kingdom of Bavaria, German Empire
- Died: 19 February 1947 (aged 45); Belgrade, PR Serbia, FPR Yugoslavia
- Cause of death: Execution by hanging
- Status: Executed
- Conviction: War crimes
- Penalty: Death
- Military service
- Allegiance: Weimar Republic; Nazi Germany
- Branch: Waffen-SS
- Service years: 1919–1945
- Rank: SS-Brigadeführer
- Commands: 21st Waffen Mountain Division of the SS Skanderbeg (1st Albanian); 7th SS Volunteer Mountain Division Prinz Eugen
- Awards: German Cross in Gold; Iron Cross 1st Class

August Schmidhuber (8 May 1901 – 19 February 1947) was an SS-Brigadeführer who commanded two Waffen-SS divisions in occupied Yugoslavia and Albania during the latter stages of World War II. He was executed by the post-war Yugoslav authorities for war crimes.

During anti-partisan operations in Yugoslavia, under his direct orders, the 21st Waffen SS Division Skanderbeg committed numerous atrocities; the division also contributed to the Holocaust by participating in the roundup and deportation of most of the Jews from Kosovo. Schmidhuber was captured in May 1945, he was tried and convicted as war criminal, he was executed in Belgrade on 19 February 1947.

== Early career ==
August Schmidhuber was born in Augsburg, Bavaria, the son of a minor government official. After finishing basic military training in the Reichswehr in Ulm in 1919, he signed up for 12 years' military service on 5 May. He was initially assigned to the Schützen Regiment (rifle regiment) Number 42. From 16 June 1919 until the beginning of October, Schmidhuber served with the 9th Company of his regiment and then spent nearly a year in 3 company.

At the same time, beginning in May 1919 to mid-June, he also entered the ranks of the Freikorps, Major Franz Ritter von Epp. Schmidhuber then transferred to Gebirgs-Jäger-Regiment (mountain hunters) Number 19 and on 1 October 1922 was appointed to the rank of Gefreiter (private). He remained in the regular German army until 4 May 1931, when he left as an Oberfeldwebel (sergeant major).

After leaving the army Schmidhuber worked as a brewer and became active in politics in Bavaria, joining the Bayerische Volkspartei (Bavarian People's Party). During the presidential elections, he stood for the district of Lindau but did not win. He then joined the Nazi Party and on 16 July 1933 entered into the Sturmabteilung (SA). In the SA, he was part of the SA Gruppe Hochland and served first as the deputy director of SA schools in the region, and then later also as a director. Schmidhuber was a member of the training command of the SA.

== SS career ==
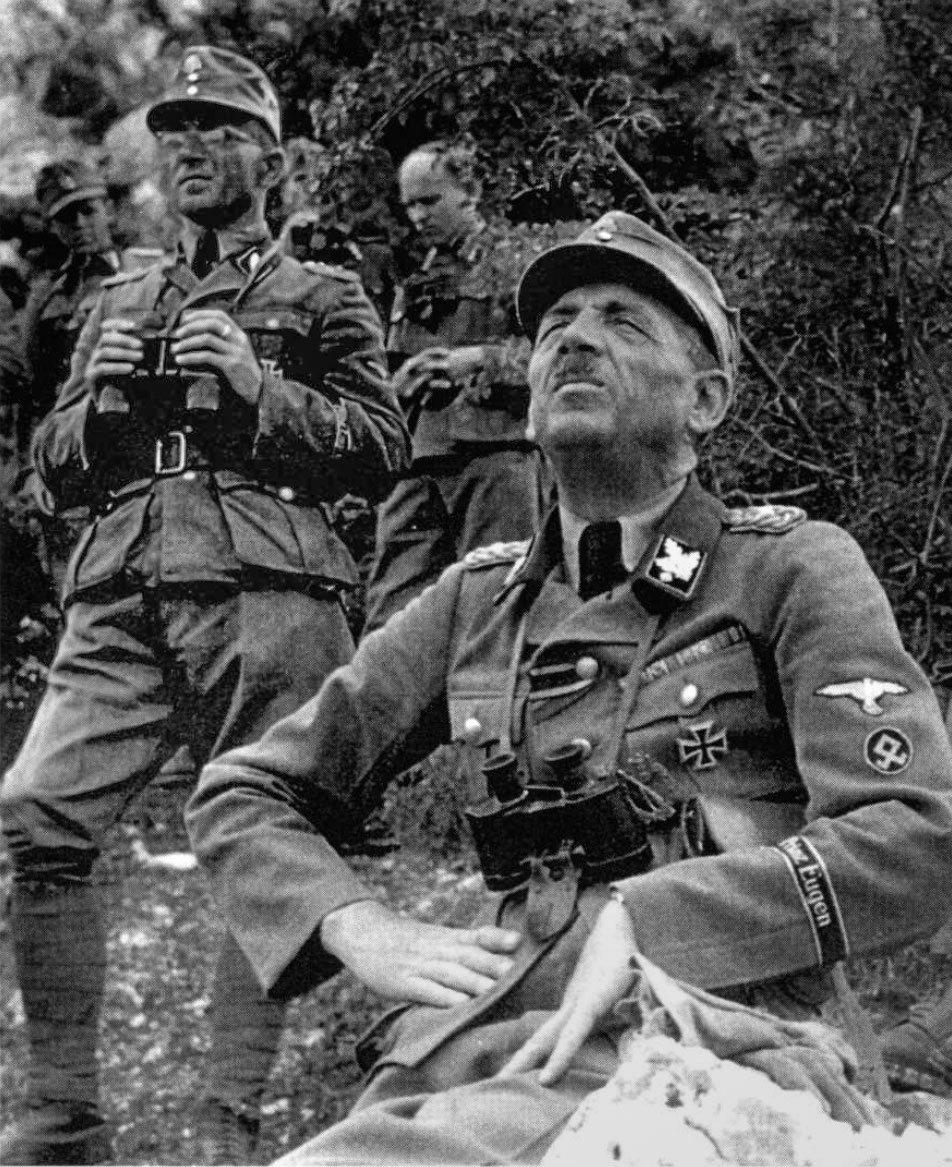
August Schmidhuber (left) as regimental commander next to Artur Phleps commander of the 7th SS Volunteer Mountain Division Prinz Eugen.

In May 1935 Schmidhuber joined the SS where he was appointed SS-Obersturmführer and immediately attached to the SS-Verfügungstruppe. Initially he commanded the 7th platoon of SS-1 Standarte and commanded troops there until early February 1936, when he was transferred to the SS Germania Regiment. There he led the 1st Company until 1 May 1936. On 13 September 1936 Schmidhuber was promoted to SS-Hauptsturmführer and transferred to the regimental staff of SS Germania. He remained there until mid-November 1937, where the company was responsible for training noncommissioned officers, until the end of February 1938.

On 30 January 1939 Schmidhuber was promoted to the rank of SS-Sturmbannführer. From 1 May to 1 November 1939, Schmidhuber was put in command of the 1st Battalion of SS Germania, while it took part in the invasion of Poland, he held this command until the end of 1940. On 21 June 1941 he was promoted to SS-Obersturmbannführer and a year later he became regimental commander in the 7th SS Volunteer Mountain Division Prinz Eugen. On 20 April 1943 Schmidhuber was promoted to SS-Standartenführer (colonel). From 28 November to late December 1943, then from 11 January to early February 1944 he temporarily held the command of Division Prinz Eugen.

On 17 April 1944 Schmidhuber became commander of the 21st Waffen Mountain Division of the SS Skanderbeg (1st Albanian), a volunteer force of ethnic Albanians under German command, which operated principally in the region of Kosovo. (Note: George Castriotta known as Skanderbeg is Albania’s national hero; he lived in the fifteenth century and fought against the Ottomans) The division became notorious for its looting and atrocities against unarmed civilians, especially ethnic Serbs. In May 1944 the SS Skanderbeg contributed to the Holocaust when it took part in the roundup and deportation of Jews from Kosovo to the Bergen-Belsen concentration camp where almost all of them perished. On 21 June 1944 Schmidhuber was promoted to SS-Oberführer. With regard to his anti-partisan activities in Kosovo during the war, the scholar Bernd Jürgen Fischer noted that Schmidhuber issued orders to "increase the burning of villages and killing of people, in keeping with these orders, between 19 September and 23 October, 131 NLM prisoners including women . . . were shot or hanged in Kosovo". The division also use retributive hangings as a response to acts of sabotage. After six months in existence, following mass desertions within its ranks, poor combat record and history of atrocities, the division was ordered disbanded on 1 November 1944 by Heinrich Himmler. Schmidhuber blamed the divisions failure on the Albanian soldier stating that "during the attack he goes only as far as he finds something to steal or sack".

Schmidhuber became a SS-Brigadeführer und Generalmajor der Waffen-SS in January 1945. Following the German evacuation of Albania, on 21 January 1945 Schmidhuber replaced SS-Brigadeführer Otto Kumm as commander of the 7th SS Volunteer Mountain Division Prinz Eugen. The German cadres of the 21st division (Reichsdeutsche and Volksdeutsche) were absorbed into the SS-Freiwilligen Gebirgsjäger Regiment 14 of Prinz Eugen, which was given the honorific name Skanderbeg in memory of its sister formation, most of the Albanian Muslims were released from service. While Schmidhuber was in command and Prinz Eugen was deployed in Dalmatia, the unit committed multiple war crimes in Split and Dubrovnik. Division Prinz Eugen fought rearguards actions against Yugoslav partisans and Russians units as part of Army Group F while the Germans were in full retreat out of the country.

== Capture and death ==
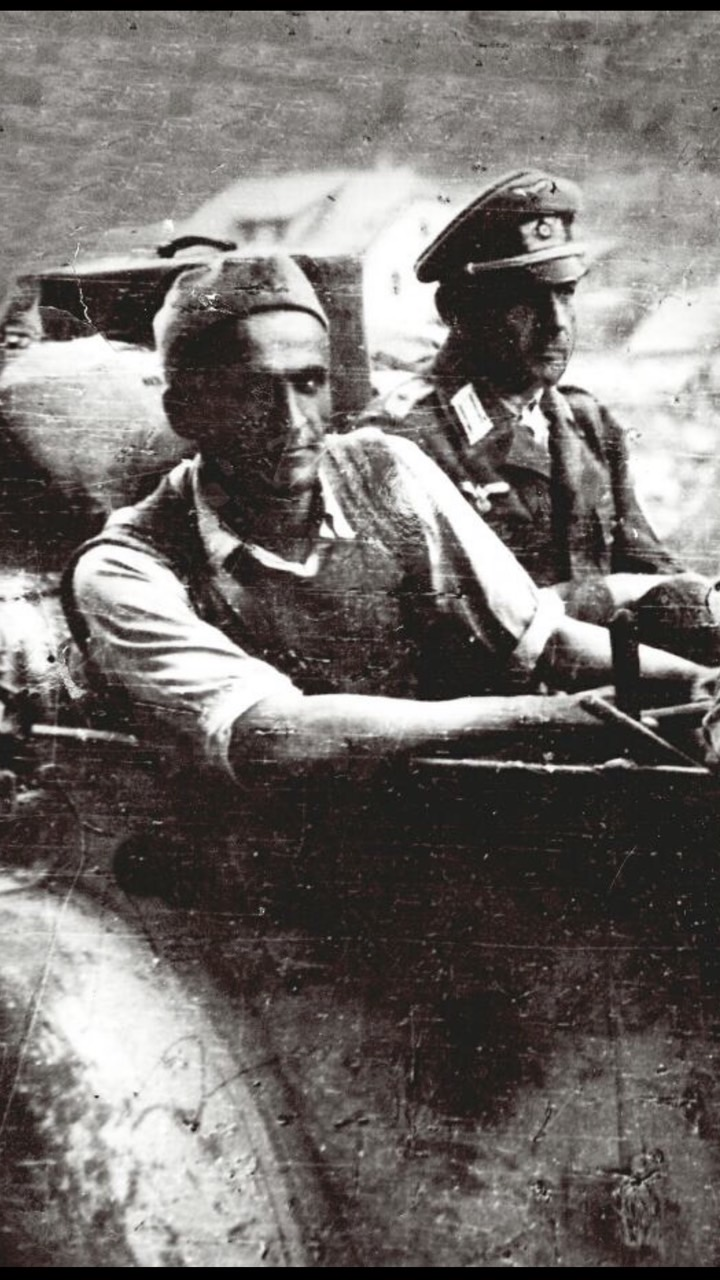
National Hero of Yugoslavia Petar Vojvodić arrests the German general August Schmidhuber, whom he previously disarmed and forced to surrender, (Slovenia, May 1945).

Schmidthuber was captured by the Yugoslav Partisans after Division Prinz Eugen surrendered at Cilli Slovenia on 11 May 1945. He was turned over to Yugoslav authorities.

A Yugoslav military tribunal tried him on charges of participating in massacres, deportations, and atrocities against civilians and sentenced him to death by hanging. Schmidhuber was executed on 19 February 1947 in Belgrade.

== Decorations and awards ==
- German cross in gold on August 3, 1943
- Iron Cross (1939) 2nd and 1st class on October 4 and November 11, 1939

== See also ==
- List SS-Brigadeführer

== Bibliography ==
- Baxter, I. (2019). 7th SS Mountain Division Prinz Eugen At War, 1941–1945: A History of the Division. Pen & Sword Books. ISBN 978-1-5267-2143-3.
- Böhler, J.; Gerwarth, R. (2016). The Waffen-SS: A European History. OUP Oxford. ISBN 978-0-19-250782-2.
- Bougarel, Xavier; Korb, Alexander; Petke, Stefan; Zaugg, Franziska (2016). "Muslim SS Units in the Balkans and the Soviet Union". In Böhler, Jochen; Gerwarth, Robert (eds.). The Waffen-SS: A European History. Oxford, England: Oxford University Press. pp. 252–283. ISBN 978-0-19-879055-6.
- Elsie, R. (2004). Historical Dictionary of Kosova. European historical dictionaries. Scarecrow Press. ISBN 978-0-8108-5309-6.
- Fischer, B.J. (1999). Albania at War, 1939–1945. Hurst. ISBN 978-1-85065-531-2.
- Goldsworthy, T. (2010). Valhalla's Warriors: A History of the Waffen-SS on the Eastern Front 1941-1945. Dog Ear Publishing. ISBN 978-1-60844-639-1.
- Hall, R.C. (2014). War in the Balkans: An Encyclopedic History from the Fall of the Ottoman Empire to the Breakup of Yugoslavia. ABC-CLIO. ISBN 978-1-61069-031-7.
- History of the United Nations War Crimes Commission and the Development of the Laws of War p. 528, United Nations War Crimes Commission, London: HMSO, 1948
- Lopičić, Đorđe (2009). NEMAČKI RATNI ZLOČINI 1941–1945, presude jugoslovenskih vojnih sudova. Beograd: Muzej žrtava genocida. ISBN 978-86-906329-8-5.
- Mitcham, S.W. (2007). German Order of Battle: Panzer, Panzer Grenadier, and Waffen SS divisions in World War II. Stackpole Books. ISBN 978-0-8117-3438-7.
- Motadel, D. (2014). Islam and Nazi Germany's War. Harvard University Press. ISBN 978-0-674-72460-0.
- Patzwall, K.D. (2001). Das Deutsche Kreuz [The German Cross 1941 – 1945 History and Recipients Volume 2] (in German). Patzwall. ISBN 978-3-931533-45-8.
- Williamson, G.; Andrew, S. (2012). The Waffen-SS (2): 6. to 10. Divisions. Men-at-Arms. Bloomsbury Publishing. ISBN 978-1-78096-581-9.
- Zaugg, F.A. (2021). Rekrutierungen für die Waffen-SS in Südosteuropa: Ideen, Ideale und Realitäten einer Vielvölkerarmee (in German). De Gruyter. ISBN 978-3-11-073077-7.

Military offices
Preceded by none	Commander of SS-Freiwilligen-Gebirgsjäger-Regiment 14 "Skanderbeg"; 15 April 1942 – 28 November 1943	Succeeded by SS-Sturmbannführer Bernhard Dietsche
Preceded by SS-Brigadeführer Josef Fitzthum	Commander of 21st Waffen Mountain Division of the SS Skanderbeg (1st Albanian); 1 May 1944 – January 1945	Succeeded by SS-Obersturmbannführer Alfred Graf
Preceded by SS-Brigadeführer Otto Kumm	Commander of 7. SS-Freiw.GebirgsDiv "Prinz Eugen"; 20 January 1945 – 8 May 1945	Succeeded by none
