= Karl von Oberkamp =

German general (1893–1947)

Carl Ritter von Oberkamp
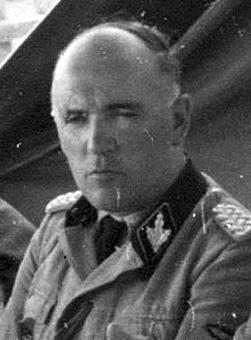
- Born: 30 October 1893; Munich, Kingdom of Bavaria, German Empire
- Died: 4 May 1947 (aged 53); Belgrade, PR Serbia, FPR Yugoslavia
- Cause of death: Execution by hanging
- Military career
- Allegiance: Nazi Germany
- Branch: Waffen-SS
- Rank: SS-Brigadeführer and Generalmajor of the Waffen-SS
- Commands: SS Division Prinz Eugen; SS Division Nibelungen; V SS Mountain Corps
- Awards: Iron Cross

Carl Ferdinand Joseph Ritter von Oberkamp (30 October 1893 – 4 May 1947) was a German Waffen-SS commander and war criminal during World War II. During his SS career, he commanded the SS Division Prinz Eugen, the SS Division Nibelungen and the V SS Mountain Corps.

Following World War II, Oberkamp was extradited to Yugoslavia, where he was tried for war crimes. He was sentenced to death and hanged in Belgrade on 4 May 1947.

== See also ==
- List SS-Brigadeführer

Military offices
Preceded by SS-Obergruppenführer Artur Phleps	Commander of 7. SS-Freiwilligen-Gebirgs-Division Prinz Eugen; 15 May 1943 – 30 January 1944	Succeeded by SS-Brigadeführer Otto Kumm
Preceded by SS-Obergruppenführer Artur Phleps	Commander of V.SS-Gebirgs-Korps; 21 September 1944 – 1 October 1944	Succeeded by SS-Obergruppenführer Friedrich Jeckeln
Preceded by SS-Gruppenführer Heinz Lammerding	Commander of 38. SS-Division Nibelungen (assigned); May 1945	Succeeded by SS-Standartenführer Martin Stange
