= Lompar =

Lompar (Cyrillic: Ломпар) is a Montenegrin surname. Notable people with the surname include:

- Andrija Lompar (born 1956), Montenegrin politician
- Milo Lompar (born 1962), Serbian literary historian
