= Rotimlja =

Rotimlja Ротимља
- Village
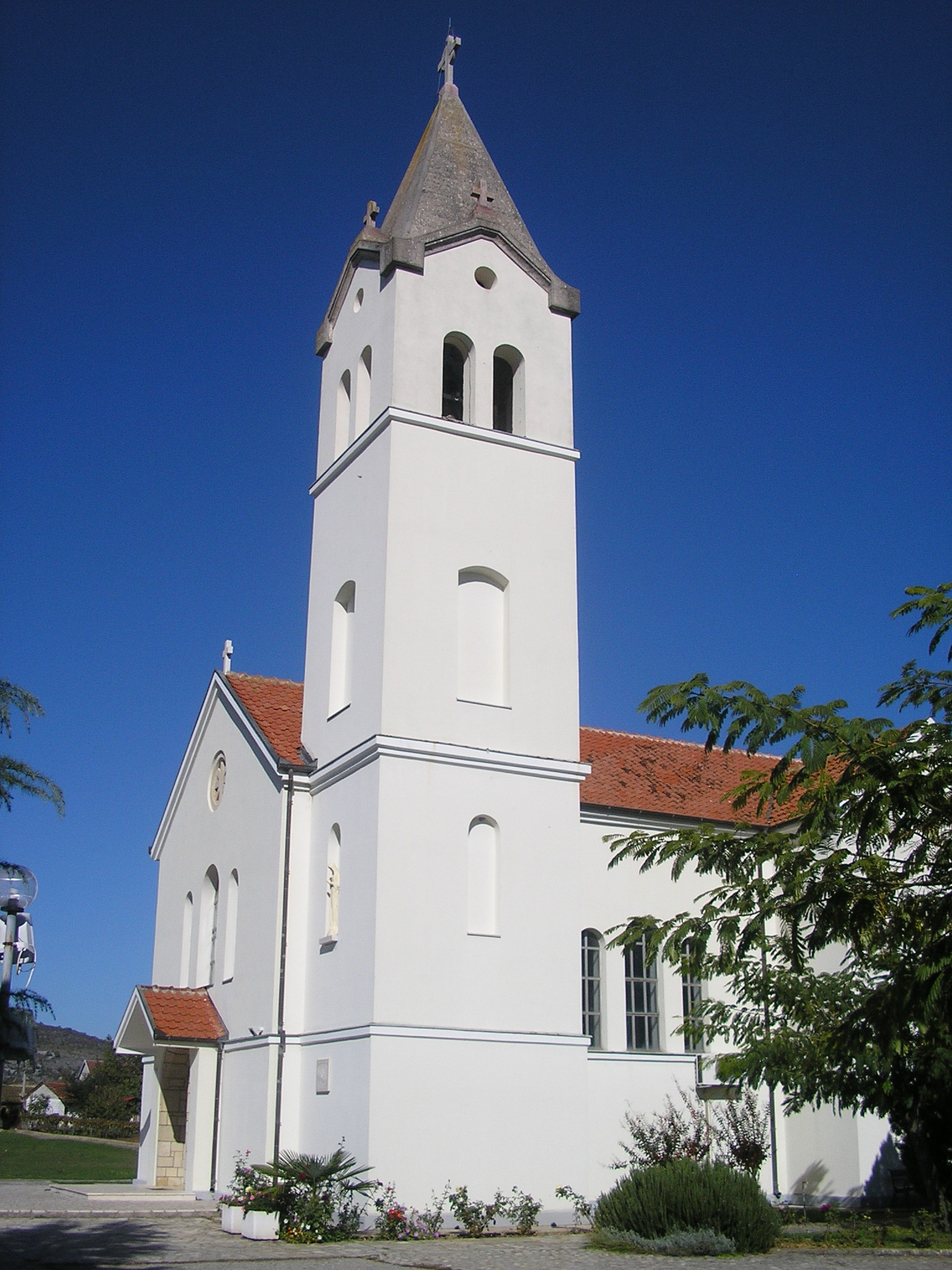
- Crkva Rotimlja

- Location within Bosnia and Herzegovina
- Country: Bosnia and Herzegovina
- Entity: Federation of Bosnia and Herzegovina
- Canton: Herzegovina-Neretva
- Municipality: Stolac

Area
  - Total: 6.37 sq mi (16.50 km^{2})

Population (2013)
  - Total: 683
  - Density: 107/sq mi (41.4/km^{2})
- Time zone: UTC+1 (CET)
  - Summer (DST): UTC+2 (CEST)

Rotimlja (Serbian Cyrillic: Ротимља) is a village in the municipality of Stolac in the Herzegovina-Neretva Canton of the Federation of Bosnia and Herzegovina in Bosnia and Herzegovina.

== Demographics ==
According to the 2013 census, its population was 683.

Ethnicity in 2013
Ethnicity	Number	Percentage
Croats	427	62.5%
Bosniaks	248	36.3%
other/undeclared	8	1.2%
Total	683	100%
