= 7.5 cm Gebirgsgeschütz 36 =

WW2 German mountain gun

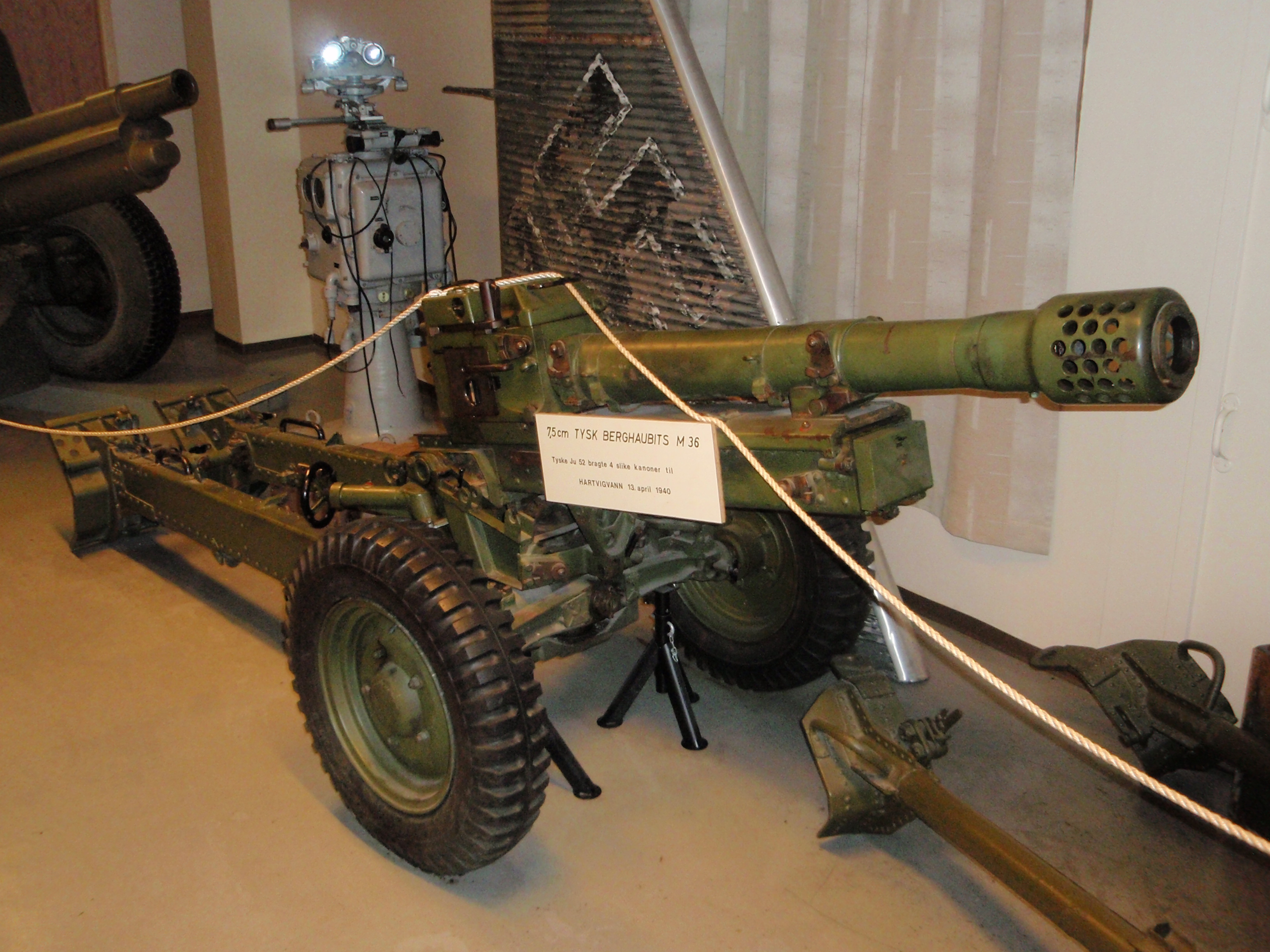
- Front of 7.5 cm Gebirgsgeschütz 36 at the War Museum in Narvik, Norway.
- Type: Mountain gun
- Place of origin: Nazi Germany

Service history
- In service: 1938−45
- Used by: Nazi Germany
- Wars: Second World War

Production history
- Designer: Rheinmetall
- Designed: 1935–38
- Manufacturer: Rheinmetall
- Produced: 1938–45
- No. built: 1,193+

Specifications
- Mass: 750 kg (1,650 lb)
- Barrel length: 1.45 m (4 ft 9 in)
- Crew: Five
- Shell: 75×130 mm. R separate-loading QF
- Shell weight: 5.75 kg (12.7 lb)
- Caliber: 75 mm (3.0 in)
- Breech: Horizontal sliding-block
- Carriage: Split trail
- Elevation: -2° to +70°
- Traverse: 40°
- Rate of fire: 6-8 rpm
- Muzzle velocity: 475 m/s (1,560 ft/s)
- Maximum firing range: 9,250 m (10,120 yd)

The 7.5 cm GebG 36 (German: 7.5 cm Gebirgsgeschütz 36) was a 7.5 cm (3.0 in) German mountain gun used during World War II. At least 1,193 were built between 1938 and 1945. It was the standard light gun of the German mountain divisions, both Army and Waffen-SS, during World War II.

== Development and description ==
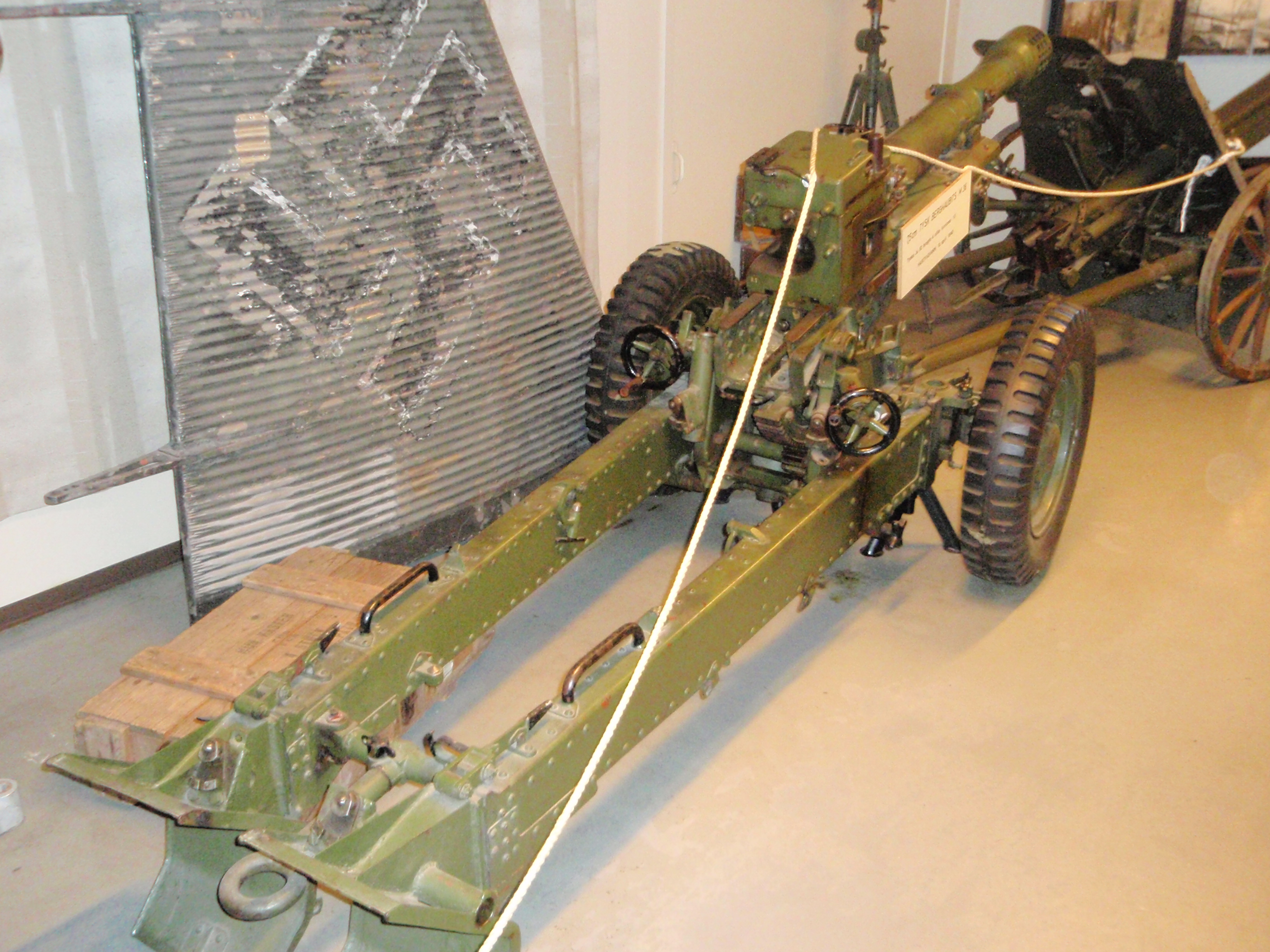
Rear of 7.5 cm Gebirgsgeschütz 36 at the War Museum in Narvik, Norway.

The 7.5 cm GebG 36 was designed by Rheinmetall to meet an Army requirement for a 7.5 cm howitzer to serve in the mountain divisions (Gebirgs Divisionen) and replace the World War I-era mountain guns still in service such as the Austro-Hungarian 7.5 cm Gebirgskanone 15. Production began in 1938 although exactly how many were produced that year is unknown. Some 1,193 were built between 1939 and 1945.

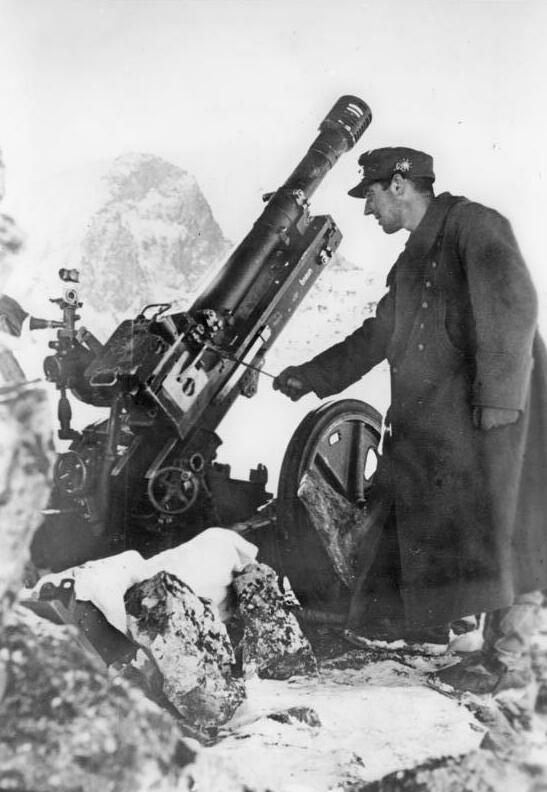
A ''Gebirgskanone'' in use in the Caucasus, January 1943

The design of the 7.5 cm GebG 36 was relatively conventional in regard to the gun itself, with its standard German horizontal sliding breech block and muzzle brake. To maximize its ability to fire at high-angles, it was given rear trunnions to lengthen the distance between the breech and the ground, although springs became necessary to balance the muzzle preponderance. Furthermore, it used the a variable recoil system that shortened the recoil as the elevation increased. The breech was uncommonly massive as it incorporated a transport joint to allow it to be separated from the barrel. The spades at the end of the split trail legs were removable. Generally it used light-alloy disc wheels with rubber rims, but early guns had wooden-spoked wheels. No shield was fitted to save weight. It could be towed in one load or broken down into eight pack-loads to be carried by mule or horse. It weighed 750 kg (1,650 lb).

Because of its lightness the 7.5 cm GebG 36 would jump when fired at low angles as the recoil forces would force the gun's trail spades to act as a fulcrum and lever the wheels upwards. In fact Charge 5, the largest propellant increment, was forbidden to be fired at angles under 15° because the gun would jump excessively. Firing at higher angles was perfectly safe as the ground absorbed any residual recoil forces not absorbed by the recoil system.

=== Ammunition ===
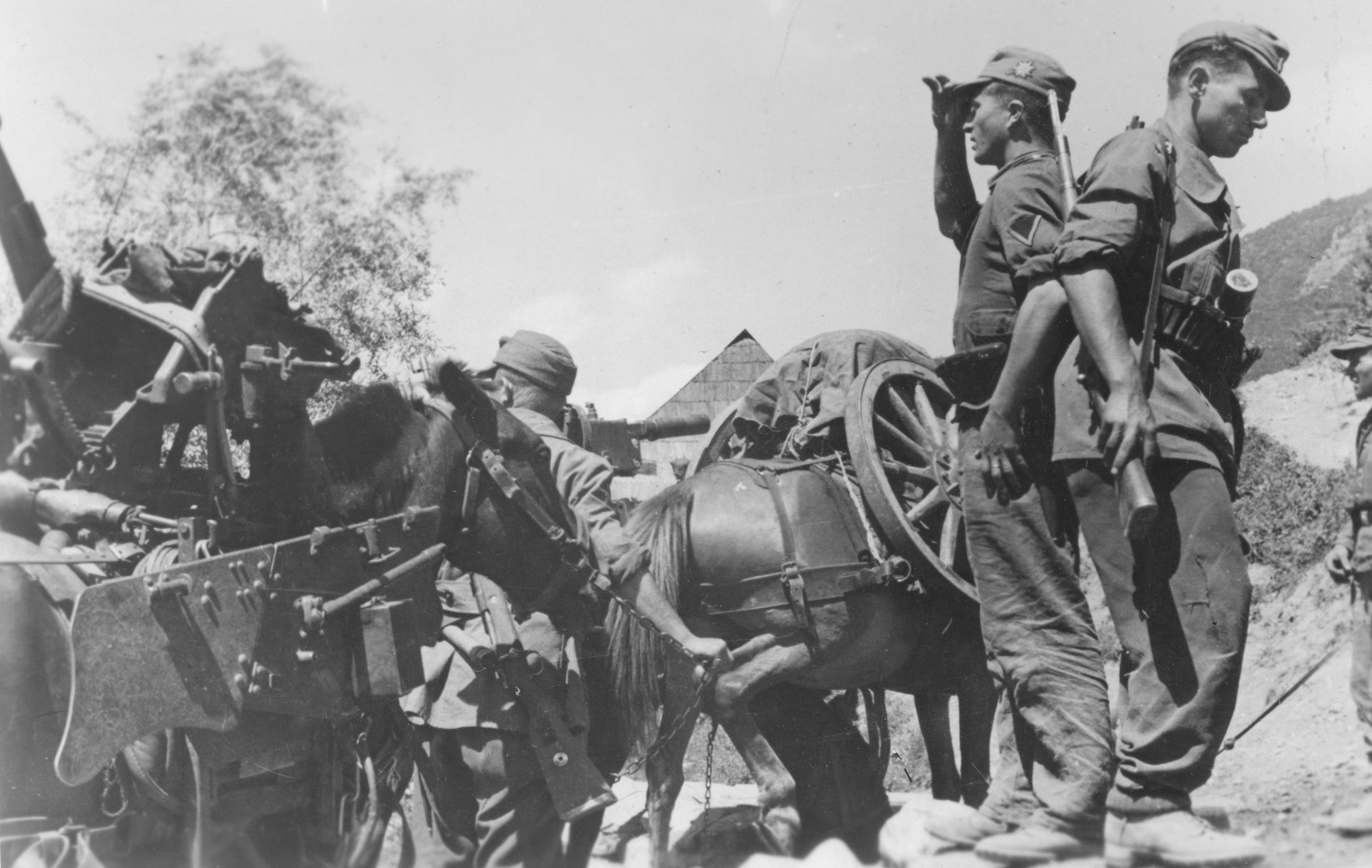
A detachment of SS mountain rifles and Albanian volunteers in the Albanian mountains with a horse-drawn fleet carrying the 75mm GebK 36 mountain cannon (7.5 cm GebG 36 separated and transported by horse).

The 7.5 cm GebG 36 fired a wide variety of ammunition, with the notable exception of a conventional armor-piercing shell. It used instead a unique hollow-charge armor-piercing shell that weighed 5.83 kilograms (12.9 lb) with a maximum range of 9,250 metres (10,120 yd). It had its own 5.83 kilograms (12.9 lb) high-explosive shell, but could also fire that used by the 7.5 cm FK 18 as well. When the situation demanded, it could fire a colored smoke shell. It used four increments of propellant which were added together to reach the desired range. A fifth charge could be used which replaced all the other charges for targets at the limit of the gun's range. While this range was respectable for a light gun, the 7.5 cm calibre soon proved too small for the demands of World War II.

== Organization ==
The guns were organized into batteries of four guns each with two or three batteries per battalion. A mountain artillery regiment (Gebirgs-Artillerie Regiment) would have anywhere from one to three battalions equipped with the 7.5 cm GebG 36.
