= Dub, Travnik =

Dub
- Village
- Location within Bosnia and Herzegovina
- Coordinates: 44.2824262°N 17.7099746°E
- Country: Bosnia and Herzegovina
- Entity: Federation of Bosnia and Herzegovina
- Canton: Central Bosnia
- Municipality: Travnik

Area
  - Total: 4.97 sq mi (12.87 km^{2})

Population (2013)
  - Total: 988
  - Density: 199/sq mi (76.8/km^{2})
- Time zone: UTC+1 (CET)
  - Summer (DST): UTC+2 (CEST)

Dub is a village in the municipality of Travnik, Bosnia and Herzegovina.

It is located close to the Vlašić mountain.

== Demographics ==
According to the 2013 census, its population was 988.

Ethnicity in 2013
Ethnicity	Number	Percentage
Bosniaks	986	99.8%
other/undeclared	2	0.2%
Total	988	100%
