= Battle of Lijevče Field =

World War II battle in Yugoslavia

- Part of World War II in Yugoslavia
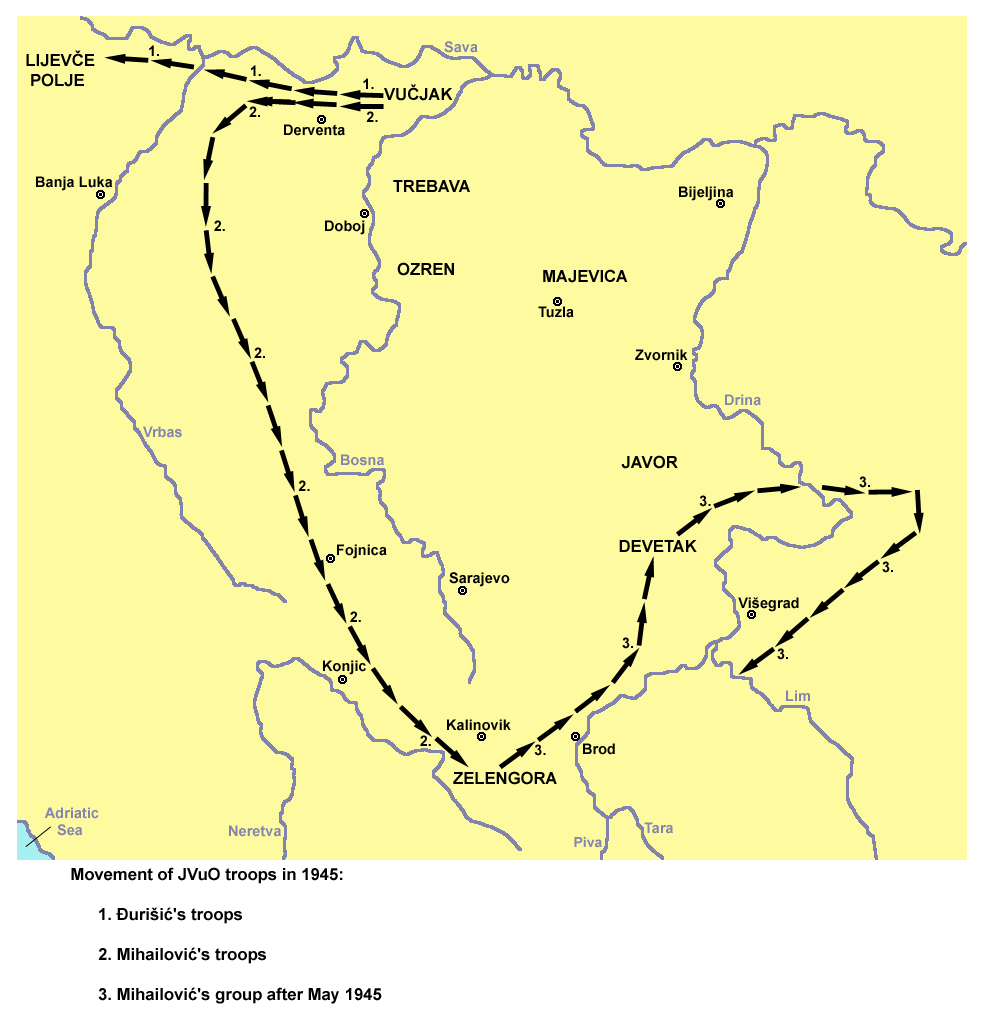
- Movement of JVuO troops in 1945.
Date	30 March – 8 April 1945
Location	Lijevče field, Independent State of Croatia (modern-day Bosnia and Herzegovina) 44°57′39″N 17°20′49″E
Result	Independent State of Croatia victory

Belligerents
Montenegrin Chetniks	Independent State of Croatia

Commanders and leaders
Pavle Đurišić (executed); Petar Baćović (executed); Zaharije Ostojić (executed); Milorad Popović †; Radojica Perišić †; Dragiša Vasić (executed); Vuk Kalaitović	Vladimir Metikoš; Zdenko Begić; Marko Pavlović

Units involved
8th Montenegrin Army: 1st Division; 5th Division; 8th Division; 9th (Herzegovina) Division; Romanija Corps; Drina Corps; Middle-Bosnian Corps; Mileševa Corps (elements); Mlava Corps (elements); Rudnik Corps (elements); Kosovo Corps (elements)	Croatian Armed Forces: 4th Croatian Division; 6th Croatian Division; Ustasha Defence; Local militias Croatian Air Force; Montenegrin National Army

Strength
10–12,000	10–12,000

Casualties and losses
Several hundred killed 5,500 captured 150 executed after the battle	Unknown

The Battle of Lijevče Field (Serbo-Croatian: Bitka na Lijevča polju, Битка на Лијевча пољу) was fought between 30 March and 8 April 1945 between the Croatian Armed Forces (HOS, the amalgamated Ustashe Militia and Croatian Home Guard forces) and Chetnik forces on the Lijevče field near Banja Luka in what was then the Independent State of Croatia (NDH).

== History ==
In December 1944, the Montenegrin Chetniks of Lieutenant Colonel Pavle Đurišić began withdrawing from German occupied Montenegro towards Northeastern Bosnia, where a meeting was convened with Draža Mihailović and other Chetnik leaders. Đurišić was critical of Mihailović's leadership, and decided to move west to Slovenia and seek Allied protection, contrary to Mihailović's conception of returning to Serbia. Chetnik commanders Zaharije Ostojić and Petar Baćović, and ideologue Dragiša Vasić joined him. Đurišić made a deal with the NDH authorities and Montenegrin separatist and NDH ally Sekula Drljević for safe passage through the territory of the NDH, for which Mihailović denounced him as a traitor. Under the agreement, Đurišić's troops were supposed to join Drljević's Montenegrin National Army and recognize Drljević as the Montenegrin leader.

The HOS and Drljević apparently intended to use the agreement as a trap for Đurišić, who also did not plan to stick to the agreement and kept moving on his own. This led to open conflict with the HOS. The first clashes occurred on 30 March around the town of Bosanska Gradiška. The entire Chetnik 8th Montenegrin Army, strengthened with several other Chetnik Corps, crossed the Vrbas River by 1 April. The HOS assembled a large force that was better organized and had a significant advantage in heavy weapons, under the command of General Vladimir Metikoš. They attacked the Chetnik forward units and forced them to withdraw towards the Lijevče field, north of Banja Luka. The HOS then attacked Đurišić's forces on the Lijevče field and blocked their path to the west. The Chetnik attempts of a breakthrough were unsuccessful, and most of the army surrendered during a large HOS attack on 7 and 8 April. A smaller detachment led by Đurišić tried to break through the HOS lines by moving south. Due to the desertion of his troops and the Partisan forces on his way, Đurišić agreed to another deal with the HOS. He was subsequently executed, along with other Chetnik officers.

The bulk of the Montenegrin Chetniks were recruited into Drljević's army and placed under the command of the HOS.

== Background ==
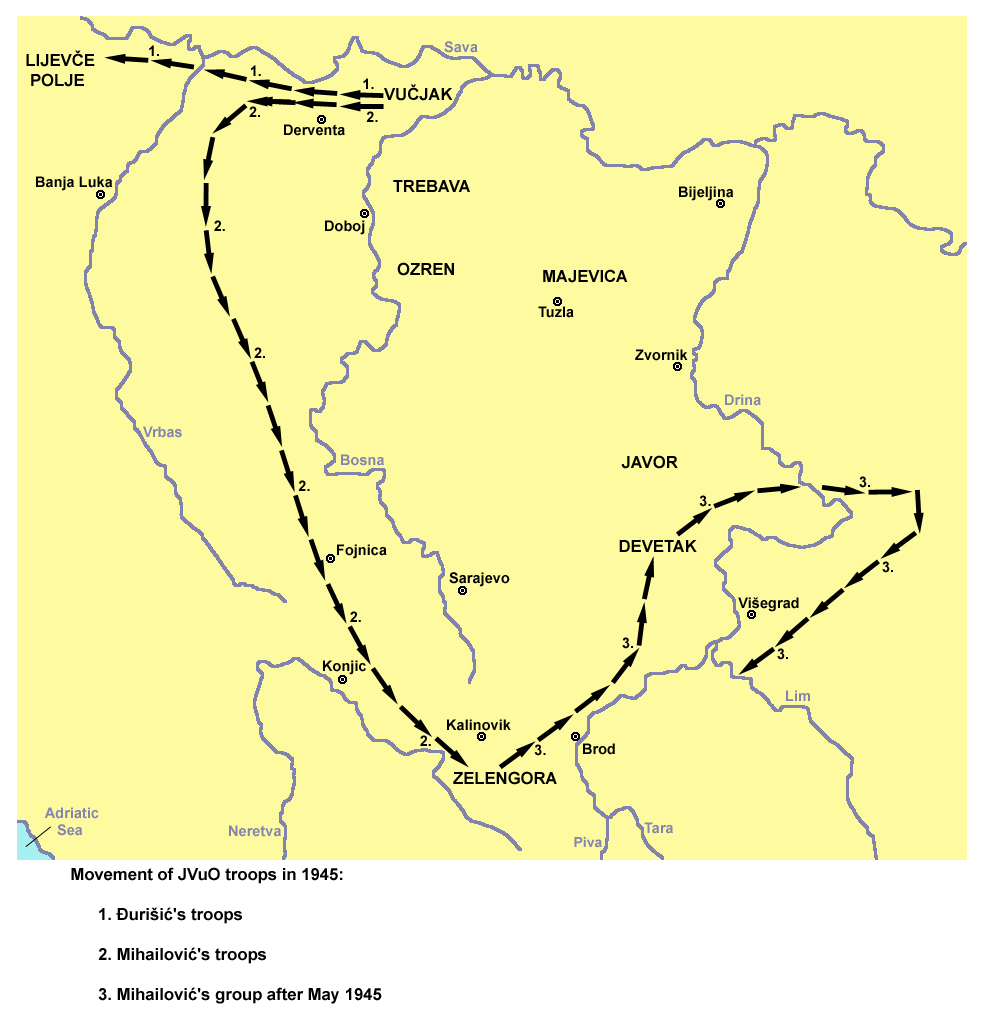
Retreat of Đurišić's (1) forces.

Following the Italian surrender in September 1943, German forces occupied the area of the Italian governorate of Montenegro. The Germans cooperated with local Montenegrin separatists, local Chetniks, and the Sandžak Muslim militia in controlling Montenegro. As these forces did not prove to be sufficient, the Germans released the imprisoned Chetnik Commander Pavle Đurišić and organized the Montenegrin Volunteer Corps, with the assistance of Nedić's government, to fight against the Yugoslav Partisans.

In late 1944, with the German withdrawal from the Balkans and the advance of the Red Army and the Partisans, the situation for the Chetniks in Serbia and Montenegro became increasingly difficult. Mihailović, who favoured continued cooperation with the Germans to obtain weapons and ammunition, ordered all Chetnik forces, including those under Đurišić's command in Montenegro, to head towards Bosnia. While the Chetniks assisted the Germans in keeping control of the communication lines, Mihailović at the same time tried to win back the support of the Western Allies. The Germans withdrew from Montenegro in early December 1944, together with Đurišić's troops. The Montenegrin Chetniks were at this point reorganized into three divisions, and included the Sandžak Chetniks of Vuk Kalaitović. They numbered 8,700 men and were accompanied by around 3,000 civilians, mostly family members. After a 35-day march, suffering from cold, hunger and diseases, Đurišić's army reached the Trebava mountain in northeast Bosnia in mid-February 1945. Upon joining the rest of the Chetniks, Đurišić criticized Mihailović's leadership and advocated a retreat to Slovenia, where they would join other Chetnik units and await the arrival of Western Allies, as opposed to Mihailović's insistence on returning to Serbia. He decided to split from Mihailović and move toward the Slovene Littoral. Đurišić was joined by Dragiša Vasić, one of the chief Chetnik ideologues and Mihailović's political adviser, the detachments of Petar Baćović, leader of the Herzegovina Chetniks, and of Zaharije Ostojić, leader of the Eastern Bosnian Chetniks. Just before his departure, on 18 March, Đurišić was joined by a part of the Chetniks from Serbia.

Đurišić made contact with Milan Nedić, head of the puppet government in German-occupied Serbia, and Dimitrije Ljotić, who agreed with his idea of gathering the Chetniks in Slovenia. With the help of the German Special Envoy in Belgrade, Hermann Neubacher, Nedić and Ljotić secured accommodation for Đurišić's troops and refugees in Slovenia. Đurišić had to reach Bihać in western Bosnia on his own, where Ljotić's forces would meet him and assist his further movement.

The area from Northeastern Bosnia to Slovenia was within the borders of the Independent State of Croatia (Serbo-Croatian: Nezavisna Država Hrvatska, NDH), an Axis puppet state. This territory was partially under the control of German and NDH forces, and partially under the Partisans. The Germans favoured increased collaboration with the Chetniks after the capitulation of Italy, despite protests from the NDH government which saw in it a danger to the existence of the state. The NDH government proposed restricting the collaboration to those Chetniks that recognize the NDH and are its citizens, and the limiting of their activities to Serb-majority areas, but the Germans did not accept such complaints. The military forces of the NDH, the Ustashe Militia and the Croatian Home Guard, were in November 1944 reorganized into the Croatian Armed Forces (Serbo-Croatian: Hrvatske oružane snage, HOS).

== Đurišić-Drljević agreement ==
In late December 1944, Đurišić sent his aide Dušan Arsović to Sarajevo to explore the possibility of a joint withdrawal with the Germans. Arsović tried to make contact with Ljubomir Vuksanović, a Montenegrin that collaborated with the Germans, but Vuksanović opposed Đurišić and refused to talk to him. Arsović then made contact with representatives of Montenegrin separatist Sekula Drljević, who spent most of the war in the NDH and wanted to create an independent Montenegrin state with German and Ustashe assistance. The Ustashe held close contacts with Montenegrin nationalists since the proclamation of the NDH in 1941, when the Montenegrin National Committee, headed by Montenegrin writer Savić Marković Štedimlija, was opened in Zagreb, the capital of the NDH. In the spring of 1944, Drljević relocated from Zemun to Zagreb, where he created an interim government called the Montenegrin State Council. The NDH supported the creation of a Montenegrin state rather than it joining Nedić's Serbia in the planned New Order of Europe, which was proposed by Neubacher in October 1943.

Talks intensified between Drljević's and Đurišić's representatives, after the split with Mihailović. Đurišić saw this as an opportunity to secure safe passage for his army to Slovenia. At a meeting in Doboj, Drljević's negotiators demanded the recognition of Drljević as the political leader of Montenegrins, the recognition of the Montenegrin State Council, and the joining of the Montenegrin Chetniks into the Montenegrin National Army. Đurišić decided to accept all of Drljević's demands, on the condition that the wounded would be accommodated. He also retained operational command of the new army. The agreement was signed on 22 March in Zagreb by representatives of both sides.

Neither party was sincere in their commitments. Drljević's motive was breaking up the Chetnik organization and creating an illusion of strength to the Germans, thus giving legitimacy to his idea of Montenegrin independence. He also had a motive to use the agreement as a trap for Đurišić, who supported the unification of Serbia and Montenegro. The Ustashe motive to capture Đurišić was revenge for massacres against Muslims of Southeastern Bosnia and Sandžak, that were committed by Đurišić's Lim–Sandžak Chetnik detachment. On the other hand, Đurišić did not want Drljević to have any real control over his army. On 22 March, Drljević sent him a leaflet for distribution among his soldiers. In it were details of the agreement, and Drljević referred to himself as the "supreme commander of the Montenegrin National Army", but Đurišić refused to spread the leaflet to his troops.

Drljević arranged the accommodation of wounded and sick with the NDH authorities. Đurišić handed them over in Bosanski Brod, and the wounded were from there transferred to Stara Gradiška. Estimates of their number range from 800 to 2,700. The rest of the army was resting outside Bosanski Brod. On 23 March, Mihailović found out about the deal and immediately informed other Chetnik commanders that Đurišić committed treason and ordered them not to help him in the retreat. He deprived Đurišić of his rank, announced a court trial for treason, and said that he would inform the Western Allies of Đurišić's siding with the Ustashe and Montenegrin separatists. Having heard of Mihailović's reaction, without consulting with Drljević, Đurišić ordered the movement of the army to the west.

Under the agreement, Đurišić's army was obliged to cross the Sava River into Slavonia, and from Slavonski Brod continue the march in the direction of Zagreb as the Montenegrin National Army. Instead, Đurišić kept moving on a route south of the river, towards the Motajica mountain and the Lijevče field, a large plain between the Bosna, Vrbas and Sava Rivers. Drljević qualified this action as a violation of the agreement and informed the HOS leadership of it. The HOS issued an order to secure the Bosanska Gradiška-Banja Luka road, where Đurišić's army was heading. The NDH leadership considered that Mihailović was behind Đurišić's action, and that his ultimate goal was to unite with Ljotić's Serbian Volunteer Corps and the Serbian State Guard in Slovenia and then attack Zagreb. This move would have allegedly bring them back the support of the Western Allies.

== Opposing forces ==
=== Croatian Armed Forces ===
Northeast Bosnia was within the area of responsibility of the 4th Ustashe Corps under the command of Josip Metzger. The Corps included the 4th Croatian Division of the HOS, stationed in Dvor, that numbered 7,000 troops and was commanded by Colonel Zdenko Begić, and the 6th Croatian Division in Banja Luka under General Vladimir Metikoš, with 4,000 troops. These forces were assisted by local militias and the Ustasha Defence. It is estimated that a total of around 10-12,000 troops, under the overall command of Vladimir Metikoš, were involved in military operations at the Lijevče field. Colonel Marko Pavlović, commander of the Ustasha Defence units, also participated in the battle.

=== Chetniks ===
Upon leaving Montenegro, in January 1945, the Chetnik units were reformed into divisions and regiments. The Montenegrin Chetniks were organized into the 1st, 5th and 8th Divisions, each having two regiments, and the independent Youth Regiment and Staff Battalion. The Mileševa Corps from Sandžak, led by Vuk Kalaitović, was not reformed and remained an independent unit. The 1st Division numbered 2,000 soldiers, the 5th Division 2,400, the 8th Division 2,200, the Staff Battalion 600, the Youth Regiment 300, Đurišić's Personal Escort, Security and Logistics had 800, while the Mileševa Corps had 400. The Drina Corps of Baja Nikić was with Đurišić from 1943. In March 1945, this force was strengthened with the Romanija Corps and Chetniks from Herzegovina, as well as elements of three Corps from Serbia: the Mlava Corps, led by Captain Jagoš Živković, the Kosovo Corps, led by Major General Blažo Brajović, and the Rudnik Corps, commanded by Captain Dragomir Topalović "Gaga". A part of the Mileševa Corps, around 200 men, split from the main group that returned to Sandžak and remained with Đurišić. The Middle-Bosnian Corps arrived in the later part of the battle.

The main army was referred to as the Chetnik 8th Montenegrin Army, and Chetniks from Herzegovina formed the 9th division. The HOS Headquarters estimated that Đurišić's army, on the way to the Lijevče field, numbered a total of 10-12,000 troops. Partisan reports estimated that Đurišić had around 10,000 troops once he reached eastern Bosnia in mid-February 1945.

== Initial skirmishes ==
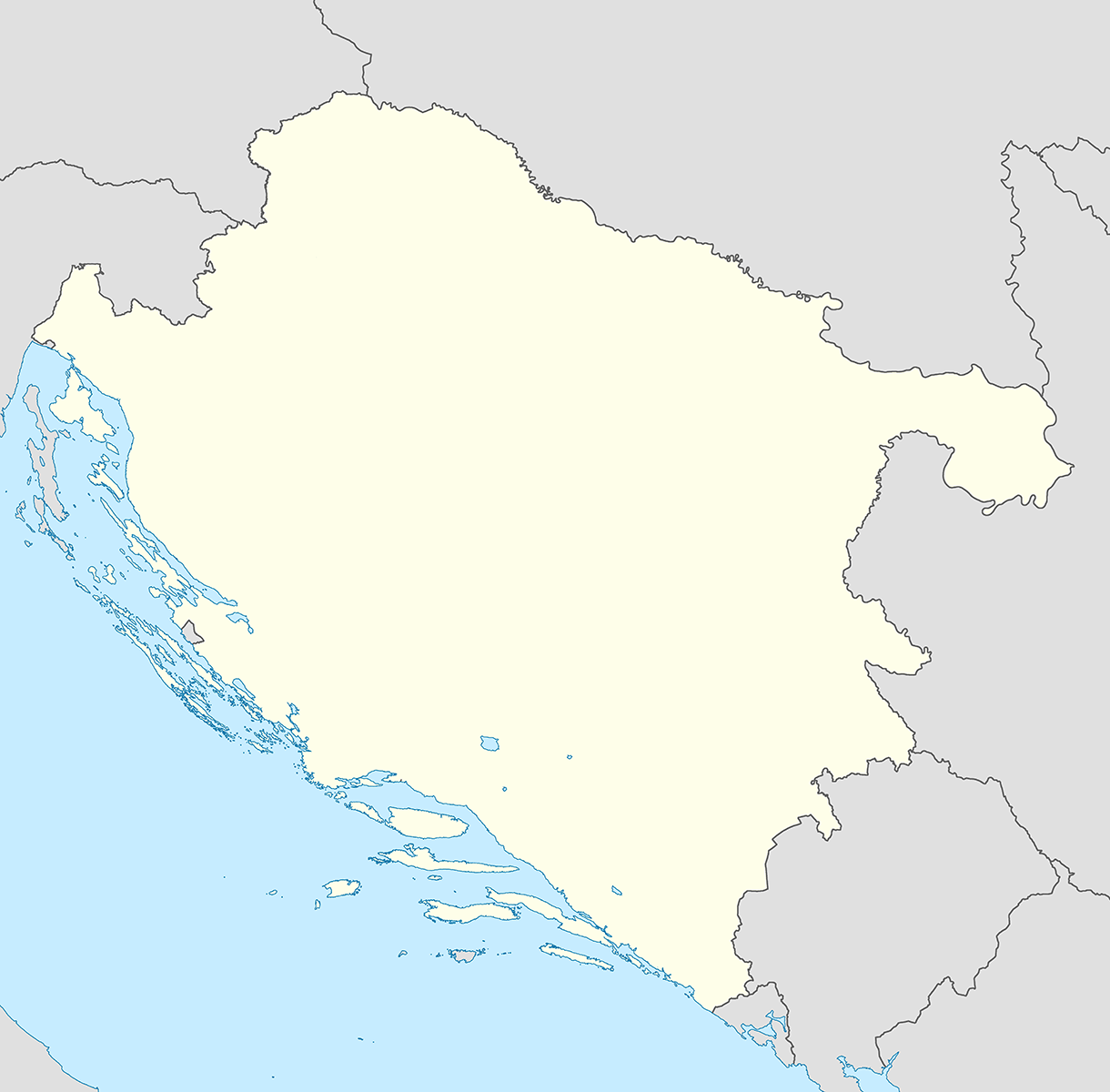
Đurišić planned to reach Bihać from the Lijevče field, which spans over Gradiška

On 30 March, the Chetnik forces passed the Vrbas River and took the village of Razboj. From there, the Mileševa Corps attacked the village of Doline on the right bank of the Sava River. The local militia in Doline was forced to retreat, and the bulk of Đurišić's forces continued their march. Đurišić planned to capture the town of Bosanska Gradiška and secure supplies for his army. By 1 April, all of his units crossed the Vrbas and reached Razboj. The army was given a two days' rest while they waited for reinforcements from the Middle-Bosnian Corps.

Units of the 6th Croatian Division and the Ustashe Defence, commanded by General Metikoš, were sent to stop the advance of Đurišić's forward units. On 2 April, Metikoš's forces attacked the Mileševa and the Drina Corps. The Chetniks suffered heavy casualties and many were taken prisoner, including Captain Sima Mijušković, who was a supporter of Drljević's idea of Montenegrin independence. He gave the HOS officers information about the number and the distribution of Chetnik forces. A large group of Chetniks, who presented themselves as Montenegrin nationalists and supporters od Drljević, surrendered to the HOS on the night of 2/3 April. At the same time, there was turmoil between Chetnik officers in the main group, due to the heavy losses of their forward units. Đurišić gave up the planned attack on Bosanska Gradiška, and instead directed his forces towards the village of Topola, south of the town.

The Croatian Air Force dropped leaflets urging the Montenegrins to abandon Đurišić and join them and Drljević in the fight against the Partisans. Units of the Partisan 2nd Yugoslav Army were positioned east of the Vrbas, and Metikoš wanted to finish the battle as soon as possible to prevent a possible Partisan attack on Banja Luka. He gathered a strong force that had a significant advantage in heavy artillery and tanks. Metikoš also ordered the building and strengthening of bunkers on the Bosanska Gradiška-Banja Luka road.

== Main battle ==
On the morning of 4 April, the HOS attacked Đurišić's troops on the Lijevče field. A battalion under Major Antun Vrban was set aside towards the Kozara mountain to keep watch against possible Partisan attacks. After a short battle, the HOS defeated the Gacko Brigade of the Herzegovina Chetniks and encamped in occupied positions, blocking the path to the west. The Commander of the Gacko Brigade, Radojica Perišić, was killed in the attack. The Chetnik leadership prepared for a quick counterattack. The 5th division was sent to capture the village of Aleksandrovac and stop the HOS advance from Banja Luka. The 1st division was tasked with capturing the village of Topola to the north, while the rest of the force was supposed to make a breakthrough at the village of Šibića Han. All three villages were situated on the Bosanska Gradiška-Banja Luka road, heavily guarded with bunkers. Their further plan was to secure a path through Partisan-held Kozara.

Đurišić tried to negotiate a truce with the HOS and a free passage towards Kozara. After the HOS rejected the request, Đurišić ordered an all-out attack on the following night. Equipped with small arms and light weapons, the Chetniks began a frontal assault on HOS positions at around 2am on 5 April. Initially, the attack achieved some success. Aleksandrovac was captured and held briefly until HOS troops from Banja Luka, reinforced with tanks, recaptured it at dawn. By then, the Chetnik attack was largely repelled by HOS artillery and bunkers. Several smaller Chetnik detachments managed to pass through the HOS lines and threatened the isolated Vrban's battalion. At the same time, the battalion came under artillery fire from the Partisan 2nd Army, so a tank company was sent to assist it. Chetnik units also came under Partisan bombardment. Đurišić's attempts of entering into negotiations with Metikoš were unsuccessful as Metikoš demanded unconditional surrender. Fighting lasted throughout the night of 5/6 April, during which additional HOS reinforcements arrived.

The Chetniks of the Gacko and Nevesinje Brigades, that made a breakthrough, reached the slopes of the Kozara mountain. As the main Chetnik attack failed, these units found themselves isolated between the Partisans and the HOS, and soon under attack from both. They were forced to retreat back to the main group. From around 800 troops, only 220 made it back. Its commander, Milorad Popović, was among the dead. In the meantime, the entire 1st Regiment of the 1st Division surrendered and switched allegiance to Drljević.

Due to the Partisan troop build-up near Banja Luka, whose 6th Croatian Division was largely involved in the fighting on the Lijevče field, the HOS decided to launch a final attack on the demoralized Đurišić's forces. Faced with desertions and an epidemic of typhus, Đurišić abandoned the idea of a full breakthrough. He formed a detachment of several hundred troops under his command, crossed the Vrbas again, and started moving towards Banja Luka, intending to bypass it from the south. The rest were supposed to feign the acceptance of an agreement with Drljević and try to reach Slovenia.

The attempt of the main army failed and in the morning of 7 April, the HOS amassed its forces near Razboj and began an artillery bombardment of Chetnik positions at around 11 AM, followed by a combined tank-infantry assault. The tanks and armoured vehicles broke the Chetnik right flank, held by the Drina Corps, and circled to their rear. Unable to hold their lines and surrounded on all sides, the Chetniks began surrendering. At the same time, a spoiling attack was ongoing on the Partisans of Koča Popović, east of Vrbas, to disrupt them while the main battle took place, which ended on 8 April.

Đurišić's 500-600 strong detachment included the entire Mileševa Corps of 200 soldiers. With him were, among others, Vasić, Ostojić and Baćović. When the detachment approached Banja Luka, Kalaitović's Mileševa Corps split from Đurišić and turned for Sandžak. On 10 April, the detachment crossed the Vrbanja River and in Čelinac met with leaders of the Middle-Bosnian Chetniks, Slavoljub Vranješević and Lazar Tešanović. The two were ready to join Đurišić, but their troops did not want to leave their villages. Đurišić kept moving down the right bank of the Vrbas and crossed it at the village of Gornji Šeher, south of Banja Luka, on 17 April. He was intercepted by the HOS on the Banja Luka-Mrkonjić Grad road and given an option to return to the original agreement he had with Drljević. The Partisans cut off the rout westwards and endangered his detachment, so Đurišić accepted the proposal. The detachment was immediately disarmed and sent to Stara Gradiška, where the rest of the surrendered forces were located.

== Aftermath ==
The number of casualties is difficult to determine. Chetnik sources mention several hundred killed Chetniks, while HOS General Vjekoslav Luburić after the war mentioned thousands of killed, which historian Domagoj Novosel considers exaggerated. Based on a German report from 9 April, 5,500 Chetniks surrendered in the area of Bosanska Gradiška.

The surrendered Chetniks and refugees accompanying them were moved to a barracks in Stara Gradiška. They were allowed to keep their weapons and were heavily guarded. Two days later, Drljević visited the barracks and gave a speech in which he urged them to be loyal to an independent Montenegro. A selection of Serbs from Montenegrins was then made by a commission set up by Drljević, with NDH assistance. Soldiers that were not from Montenegro or Herzegovina were set aside and imprisoned by the NDH authorities, including those that were recognized as enemies of Montenegrin separatists. The rest were placed into three brigades of the Montenegrin National Army. Colonel Boško Agram, a member of the Montenegrin Federalist Party, was named its commander. The officers that were admitted to the new army had to pledge allegiance to Independent Montenegro. The new army was then transferred to the area of the 2nd Ustashe Corps in Sisak, under General Luburić, and the 5th Ustashe Corps in Karlovac, under General Ivan Herenčić. On 17 April, Drljević outlined his agenda as the fight against a new Yugoslavia, the Chetniks of Draža Mihailović, and Soviet influence. Achieving Montenegrin statehood was outlined as the main war objective.

While events after the capture of Đurišić are unclear, sources agree that he and his officers were executed in the area of the Jasenovac concentration camp. Among the killed were Ostojić, Baćović, and Vasić, and around 150 others. Around 35 of those, including Đurišić, were killed near main Jasenovac site, while rest were killed in Stara Gradiška.

After the battle around 600 Chetniks who didn't surrender to Ustaše, crossed on the right side of Vrbas and stationed themselves in villages on that side. Local Partisans attacked them to prevent them from being an aid in larger attack and to stop them from joining forces with Chetniks gathered around Chetnik High Command. On 9th of April in a report, partisans claim to have killed 50, drowned 45, 50 wounded and 240 captured Chetniks, which included Đurišić's wife and child and wives of other officers. Report from 26th claims total 266 captured and 10 Chetniks which surrendered. Exact fate of prisoners of war is unknown, however considering that local partisan commanders were thinking about conscripting them, most of them were probably spared. Rest of survivors (around 200 of them), which included Vuk Kalaitović's Chetniks, successfully joined with Chetnik main force.

In May 1945, the Montenegrin National Army retreated towards Austria together with the HOS. A large number of its troops defied Drljević and Agram once they crossed the border into Slovenia. Only a small number remained loyal to Drljević. Their attempt to surrender to the British forces at Bleiburg was rejected and were instead repatriated to Yugoslavia. Many were then killed by the Partisans. Drljević managed to evade capture and was interned at a camp in Austria. He was killed in the fall of 1945 by former members of the Montenegrin Chetniks.

== See also ==
- Military history of Croatia
- World War II in Yugoslavia
- Anti-partisan operations in World War II
