= Battle of Poljana =

1945 battle of World War II in Yugoslavia

- Part of World War II in Yugoslavia and the End of World War II in Europe
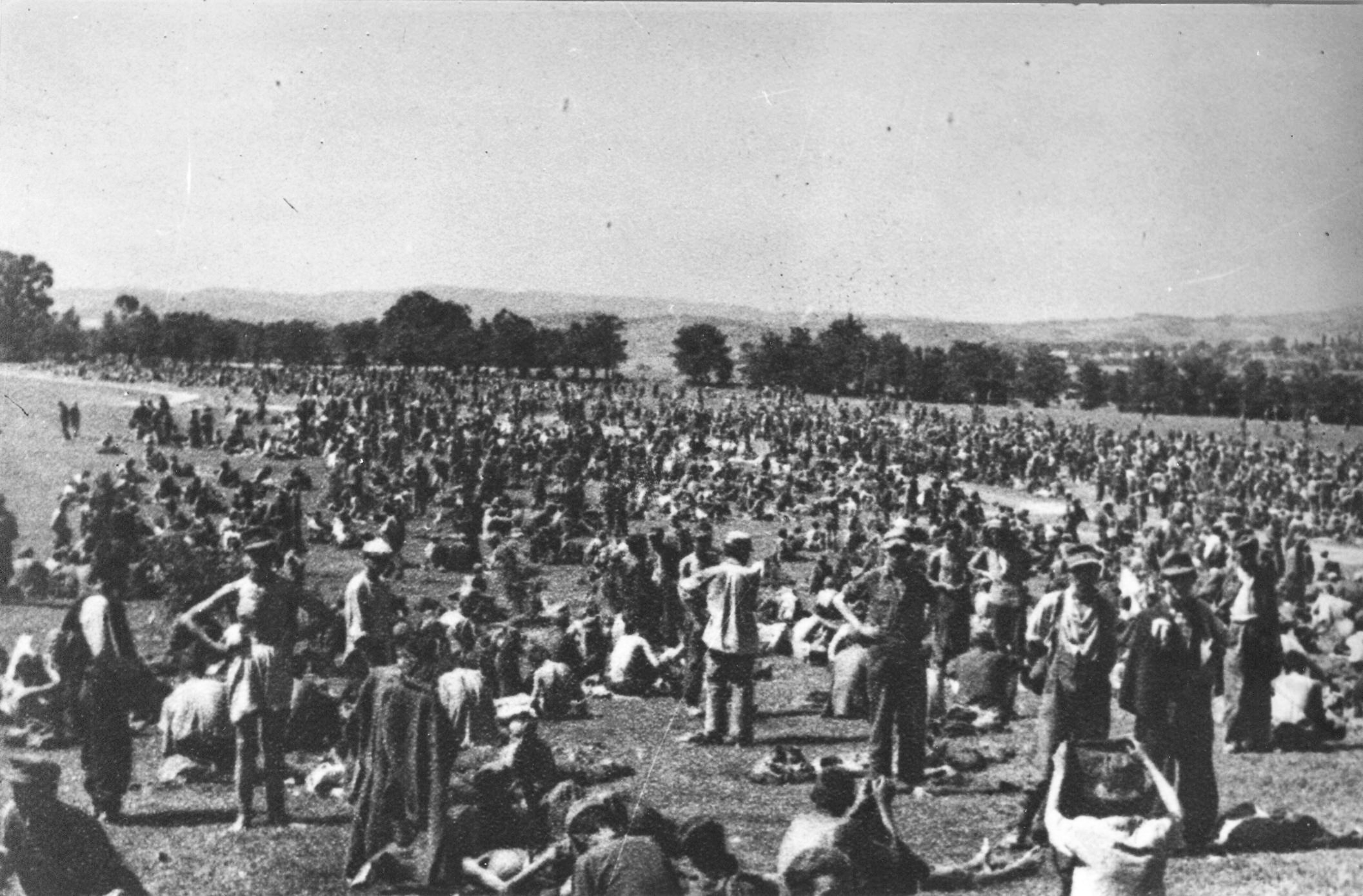
- Captured Germans, Ustaše, Chetnik, Slovene soldiers and civilians in Maribor after the battle
Date	May 14–15, 1945
Location	Poljana, near the village of Prevalje, Yugoslavia
Result	Yugoslav victory: Axis forces surrender; Beginning of the Bleiburg repatriations

Belligerents
Axis and collaborationist forces: Germany; Croatia; Slovene Home Guard; Chetniks	Yugoslavia

Commanders and leaders
(Nazi Germany) Alexander Löhr (executed) (Nazi Germany) August Schmidhuber (executed) (Nazi Germany) Helmuth von Pannwitz (executed) (Nazi Germany) Erwin Rösener (executed) (Nazi Germany) Desiderius Hampel (surrendered) (Independent State of Croatia) Ante Pavelić (surrendered) (Independent State of Croatia) Vjekoslav Luburić (MIA) (Independent State of Croatia) Rafael Boban (MIA) (Independent State of Croatia) Vjekoslav Servatzy (executed) (Independent State of Croatia) Vladimir Metikoš (executed) (Chetniks) Kosta Mušicki (executed) (Chetniks) Marisav Petrović; Sekula Drljević (executed); Leon Rupnik (executed)	Kosta Nađ; Petar Drapšin

Units involved
(Nazi Germany) Army Group E: 104th Jäger Division; 369th (Croatian) Infantry Division; 373rd (Croatian) Infantry Division; 392nd (Croatian) Infantry Division; 7th SS Volunteer Mountain Division Prinz Eugen; XV SS Cossack Cavalry Corps; (Independent State of Croatia) Croatian Armed Forces: Ustaše Militia; Domobrans; Montenegrin National Army; Chetniks: Montenegrin Chetniks; Serbian Volunteer Corps; Slovene Home Guard	Yugoslav Army: 3rd Army; 4th Army

Strength
Mixed column of 30,000 Axis soldiers and civilians	Unknown

Casualties and losses
350 killed, wounded or missing	100 killed and wounded
- Mainly Croatian Ustaše, Slovene Home Guard, remnants of pro-Axis Chetniks, Serbian Volunteer Corps, and German prisoners of war and Croat, Serb, Bosniak, and Slovene civilians accused of association with atrocities and collaboration

The Battle of Poljana took place outside of Poljana, near the town of Prevalje in Yugoslavia (modern-day Slovenia) between the Yugoslav Army and a column of 30,000 retreating Axis soldiers, which consisted of the German Wehrmacht, the Croatian Armed Forces (which consisted of Home Guard and Ustaše soldiers), the Montenegrin People's Army (which was of former Chetniks and survivors of the Battle of Lijevče Field), the Serbian Volunteer Corps, the Slovene Home Guard, the 15th Waffen SS Cossack Cavalry Corps and other collaborationist forces who were on their way to surrender to the British in Austria. The battle was one of the last confrontations of World War II in Europe taking place on 14 and 15 May 1945, 6 days after Germany unconditionally capitulated.

== Background ==
Yugoslavia was invaded by Germany, Italy, Hungary and Bulgaria on 6 April 1941. Poorly prepared and overrun, the Yugoslav army capitulated after 11 days of fighting on 17 April. Following the invasion, Yugoslavia was split between the Axis powers with annexed and occupied territories. The Italians and Germans supported the proclamation of the Independent State of Croatia (Serbo-Croatian: Nezavisna Država Hrvatska, NDH), a puppet state led by dictator Ante Pavelić who was also the leader of the ultranationalist Ustaše movement. The country was founded on the territories of modern-day Croatia and all of Bosnia and Herzegovina. Within weeks of its creation, NDH authorities implemented genocidal policies against its Serb, Romani, and Jewish populations living within the new borders.

Armed resistance broke out almost immediately within the territories following the Axis occupation of Yugoslavia. Initial resistance lacked a centralized ideology and was largely based around survival, particularly Serbs who took up arms against the Ustaše. However, two main forms of opposition emerged in importance and size, the Serbian monarchist Chetniks led by Draža Mihailović and the multi-ethnic communist Partisans led by Josip Broz Tito. Both groups initially collaborated against the Axis, however ideological differences and ethnic tensions led to a guerrilla insurgency between the two movements.

The Chetniks were based on the objective of establishing a Greater Serbia, ethnically cleansing regions with Bosnian Muslims and Croats while also collaborating with the Italian and German forces in destroying the Partisans. On the other hand, the Partisans welcomed everyone regardless of ethnic and religious differences, even declaring amnesty for those who were involved with the Axis. Consequently due to the Chetnik’s decision on cooperation with the Axis, the Allies recognized the Partisans by 1943 as the official Allied forces in Yugoslavia.

End of the war

Several Croat officials staged a coup against Pavelić in August 1944, in an attempt to get the NDH on the side of the Allies. The Lorković-Vokić plot was discovered before it could be carried out and resulted in the imprisonment and execution of conspirators Mladen Lorković and Ante Vokić, as well as those involved with the planning. By the beginning of 1945, the European Axis powers had been defeated. As the Partisans began approaching the capital of Zagreb, the government of the Independent State of Croatia began preparations to flee the country. In a vain gesture to gain the trust of the Allies, the NDH government revoked their racial policies on 5 May, in which the Ustaše exterminated the majority of Serbs, Jews, and Roma during the course of the war.

The next day, Pavelić and the NDH government left Zagreb. That same day, a column of 30,000 soldiers from Army Group E (German: Heeresgruppe E) began their retreat north to Austria, seeking an opportunity to surrender to the British and evade Partisan reprisals. Most of the soldiers within the column were those in the German Wehrmacht and Waffen-SS, the NDH Armed Forces (the Ustaše and Home Guard), Slovene Home Guard, Montenegrin National Army (Chetniks from Montenegro), and the Axis-aligned Cossack Cavalry Corps. Despite assurances from Tito that all Axis prisoners would be treated accordingly, some Partisans began rounding up and summarily executing Volksdeutsche and Ustaše soldiers in the thousands. Tito eventually gave orders to two divisions: the 3rd and 4th in Carinthia to cut off the route into Austria and to capture the prisoners.

== Battle ==
On May 14 shortly before 9:00 am, the 30,000 strong column of German, Croat, Chetnik, and Slovene soldiers smashed through the defense of Poljana, which was a small town close to the Austrian border. The dire situation rapidly deteriorated into a bloodbath with artillery being exchanged by both sides which went on into the night. Large number of skirmishes took place around the field surrounding Poljana, with individuals and small groups fleeing to the hills to make their own way towards Austria while others fell to complete confusion and chaos.

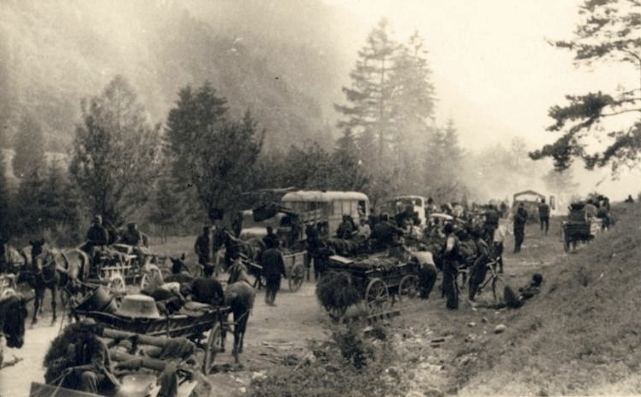
A columm of Axis soldiers and civilians approaching Austria in May 1945

Finally on the morning of May 15, around 20 British tanks arrived and both sides made negotiations. The white flag of surrender was finally raised at 4:00 pm. The Axis suffered 350 dead, while the Yugoslav Army only suffered 100 losses. It was one of the last battles of World War II in Europe and would be the culmination of the Axis retreat out of Yugoslavia.

Much to the horror of the column of Axis soldiers, the British made it harshly clear that they would not accept their surrender and instead they unconditionally surrendered to the Yugoslav Army. Britain, which at this point had tens of thousands of German, Ustaše, Chetnik, Cossack, Slovene soldiers and civilians in custody, handed the rest of their prisoners at gunpoint to the Yugoslav forces who began massacring the column in what became known as the Bleiburg repatriations.
