= Vuk Kalaitović =

Yugoslav military officer (1913–1948)

- Вук Калаитовић
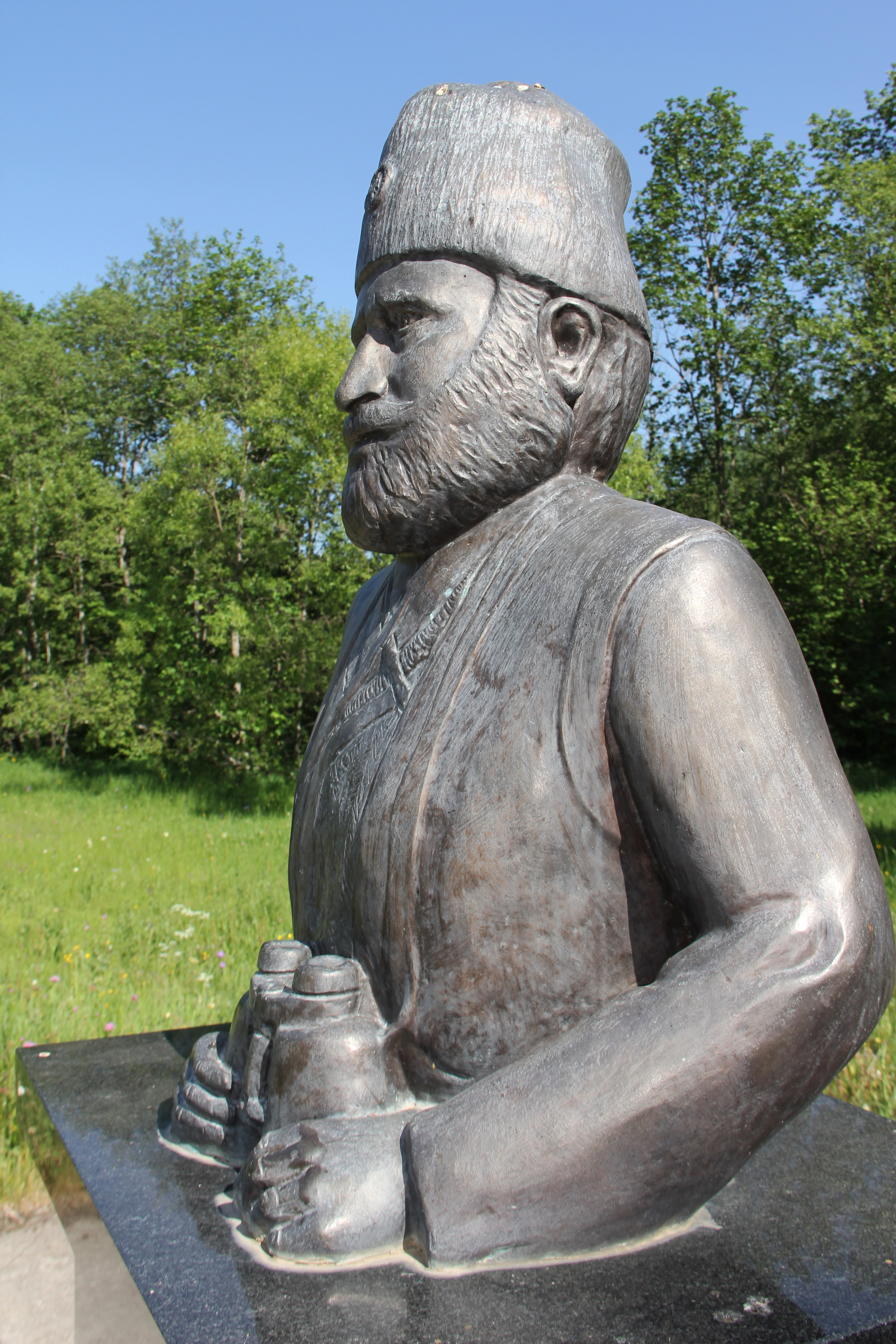
- Born: 1913; Štitkovo, Nova Varoš, Kingdom of Serbia
- Died: 1948 (aged 34–35); Pravoševo, Zlatar, FPR Yugoslavia
- Military career
- Allegiance: Kingdom of Yugoslavia
- Branch: Chetniks
- Rank: Captain
- Nickname: Kalait
- Commands: Mileševa Corps
- Conflicts: World War II; Capture of Kokin Brod; Battle of Nova Varoš; Battle of Lijevče Field

Vuk Kalaitović (Serbian Cyrillic: Вук Калаитовић; 1913—1948) was a Yugoslav military officer holding the rank of captain who was commander of the Chetnik Mileševa Corps during World War II.

== World War II ==
=== Anti-Axis uprising in Serbia ===
Kalaitović became active in resistance to Axis occupation of Yugoslavia in August 1941. On 25 August, together with units of voivode Đekić and Vlajko Ćurčić (voivode of Zlatar) he participated in capture of Axis controlled Kokin Brod when all members of its garrison were killed. His deputy was Borislav Mirković.

Kalaitović almost certainly participated in the Battle of Nova Varoš on 5 September 1941.

=== Establishment of the Mileševa Corps ===
On 29 October 1941 Kalaitović attended the gathering of people from villages Štitkovo, Božetić and Bukovik, organized by Chetnik officer Boža Javorski. In February 1942 joint forces of Chetniks under command of Kalaitović and Muslim militia commanded by Hasan Zvizdić attacked the Communist forces. Originally Kalaitović was under command of Chetnik commander Miloš Glišić, who worked both for the German-appointed puppet Government of National Salvation and for the Chetniks of Draža Mihailović. During anti-Partisan operation in April–May 1942, Kalaitović's detachment was known for lack of discipline, as well as from robbery from local population. Village of Ujniče near Nova Varoš, was completely robbed and razed and few citizens were killed by Kalaitović's men. Glišić thought this behaviour was 'ruining image of Chetnik movement'. After Glišić was arrested by Gestapo in Autumn of 1942 the organization of the Chetnik units in valley of the river Lim was changed, based on the initiative of Pavle Đurišić, and Mileševa Corp was established.

=== Participation in Đurišić's raids of revenge ===
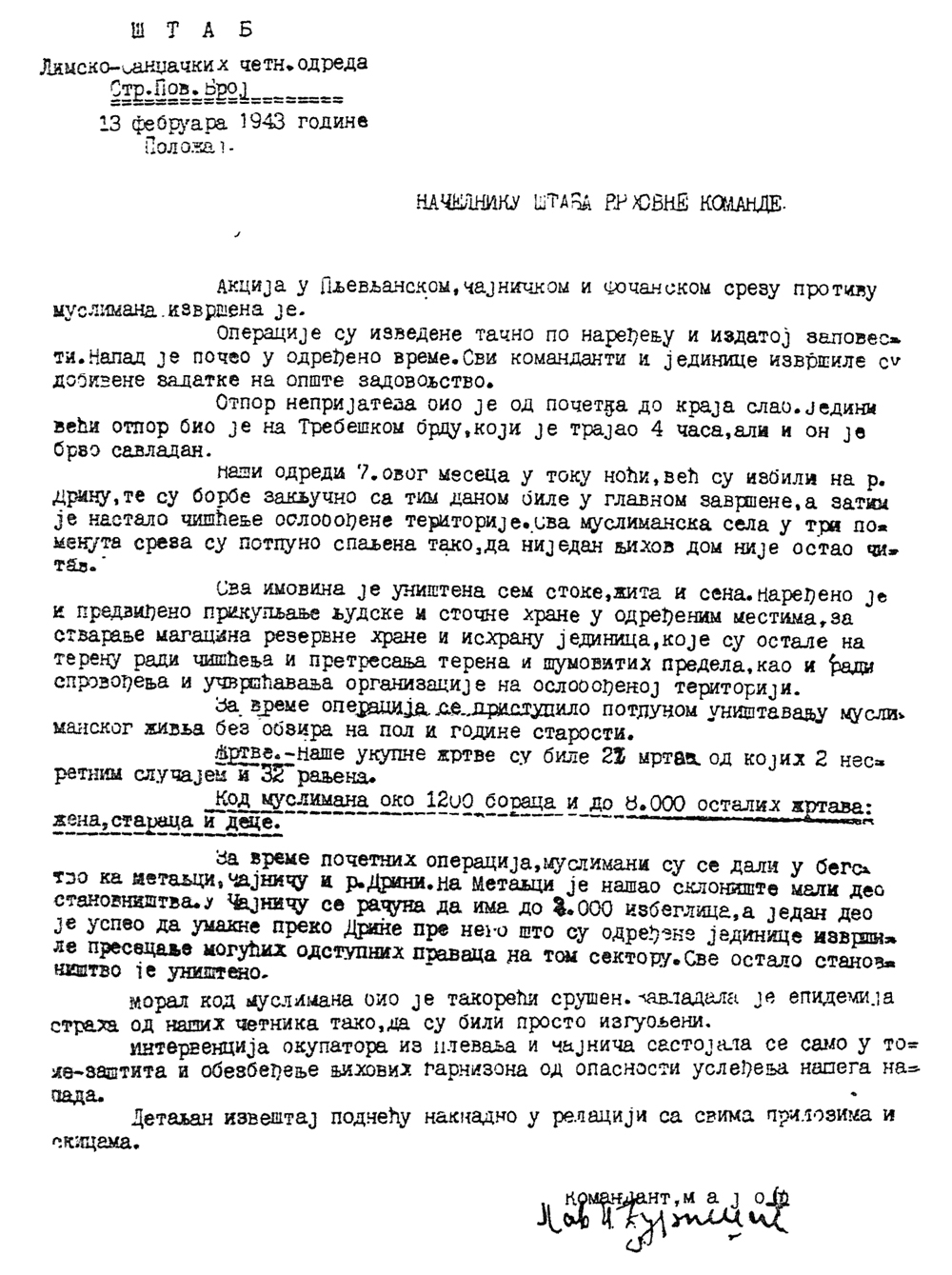
Đurišić's report of 13 February 1943 informing Mihailović of the killings of Muslims in the counties of Čajniče and Foča in southeastern Bosnia and in the county of Pljevlja in the Sandžak.

On January 5, 1943, Montenegrin Chetniks, commanded by Pavle Đurišić, attacked 33 villages predominantly populated with Muslims in the region of Lower Bihor. They pursued raids of revenge against Sandžak Muslims, many being innocent villagers, with the goal of settling accounts with Muslim militias.

In February 1943, Chetnik units commanded by Kalaitović, together with those commanded by Ostojić, Baćović, Đurišić and Lukačević killed about 1,200 Muslim Militiamen and about 8,000 women, children and old people. In just one village, Kasidoli near Priboj, Kalaitović's troops killed 227 Muslims, most of whom were killed either by cold weapons or by being burnt alive in their homes.

=== Anti-partisan terror ===
In June 1943. Kalaitović ordered killing of 12 prominent pro-partisan villagers in Bistrica near Nova Varoš. Another crime in Bistrica by Kalaitović's Chetniks happened in October of same year, when they killed 5 members of same family and burnt down 45 houses of partisan supporters. In June 1944. 17 citizens of Nova Varoš and near by villages were executed by Mileševa Corps.

=== Retreating with Đurišić toward Slovenia through Bosnia ===
Mileševa Corp with 200 men at that time commanded by Kalaitović joined retreating units of Pavle Đurišić at the end of 1944. On 16 December 1944 his units were ambushed near Miljevina and suffered substantial casualties that left him unable for further actions.

The Chetnik units were restructured against the order published on 5 January 1945, but Mileševa Corps remained non-restructured and under command of Kalaitović and among other Chetnik units of Chetnik HQ for Montenegro, Boka and Old Ras. Kalaitović and his units participated in the Battle of Lijevče Field.

=== Leaving Đurišić and return to Štitkovo ===
After the battle, Kalaitović and group of his Chetniks retreated from the region of Banja Luka with intention to return to Sanjak region. They left Đurišić on 9 April 1945. In area between Kalinovik and Foča, 37th Sandžak division inflicted significant losses to Kalaitović's Chetniks. According to report dated 1 May 1945 they captured around 80 Chetniks, and Kalaitović escaped towards Romanija with around hundred men.

Kalaitović was one of Chetnik commanders who survived defeat of Chetnik forces on Zelengora on 13 May 1945.

After the war Kalaitović lead a unit of outlaws, who were responsible for killing 31 people, mostly civilians. Kalaitović died in January 1948, in a fight with Yugoslav police.

== Legacy ==
In 2010 a monument dedicated to Kalaitović was placed in the village of Štitkovo on the Kalaitović family estate. Serbian historian Salih Selimović states that Kalaitović protected the Muslim population and never attacked any of Muslim localities within the zone of his responsibility. When, during 1945, Communist authorities discovered that Kalaitović was hiding in the village of Kladnica, they blocked the area, but Muslim villagers helped Kalaitović to hide and escape. Serbian historian Dubravka Stojanović objected to the monument in Štitkovo because Kalaitović's units did commit war crimes. In 2013 a memorial plaque to 108 Chetniks who died in the World War II was placed in Štitkovo.

== Sources ==
- Đurić, Veljko Đ; Mijović, Miličko (1993). Ilustrovana istorija četničkog pokreta. Narodna knj.
- Pajović, Radoje (1977). Kontrarevolucija u Crnoj Gori: Četnički i federalistički pokret, 1941–1945 [The Counter-revolution in Montenegro: The Chetnik and Federalist Movements, 1941–1945] (in Serbo-Croatian). Cetinje: Obod. OCLC 5351995.
- Petrović, Milić F. (2009). "Nacionalni Pokreti u Pljevaljskom Kraju 1941-1945". Istorija Pljevalja. Opština Pljevalja.
- Redžić, Vučeta (2002). Građanski rat u Crnoj Gori: Dešavanja od sredine 1942. godine do sredine 1945. godine. Stupovi.
- Živković, Milutin D. (2017). Санџак 1941–1943 [Sandžak 1941–1943] (Doctoral) (in Serbo-Croatian). Belgrade: University of Belgrade. OCLC 1242119546.
- Radanović, Milan (2016). Kazna i zločin: snage kolaboracije u Srbiji: odgovornost za ratne zločine (1941–1944) i vojni gubici (1944–1945) [Punishment and Crime: Collaboration Forces in Serbia: Responsibility for War Crimes (1941-1944) and Military Losses (1944-1945)] (in Serbo-Croatian). Belgrade, Serbia: Rosa Luxemburg Stiftung. ISBN 978-86-88745-16-1.
