= Wilhelm Keiper =

- Born: January 3, 1893
- Died: September 1, 1957 (aged 64)
- Military career
- Allegiance: Nazi Germany (1933–1944)
- Rank: Generalmajor
- Commands: Plenipotentiary general of Montenegro
- Conflicts: World War II

Wilhelm Keiper (3 January 1893 – 1 September 1957) was a Generalmajor in the Wehrmacht of Nazi Germany during World War II. Between September 1943 and November 1944 he was the German plenipotentiary general of the German occupied territory of Montenegro.

== German occupied territory of Montenegro ==
When the German occupied territory of Montenegro was put under the military commander south-east in September 1943, Keiper was appointed as German plenipotentiary general. He was in charge for military affairs, while political affairs were entrusted to Hermann Neubacher who followed wishes of the Montenegrin governmental committee of Ljubomir Vuksanović.

=== Feldkomandanture number 1040 ===
Germany established a new Field Headquarters (Feldkomandanture number 1040) to govern over Montenegro (Serbian: Самостална федлкомендатуре за Црну Гору). Keiper's residence was building of the former British envoy in Cetinje. On the wall of his cabinet there were two copies of the paintings of Serb painter Paja Jovanović, The Second Serb Uprising and Migration of the Serbs.

On 30 September 1943 Keiper published his statement in which he emphasized that Germany had no territorial pretensions over Montenegro and that German forces are in Montenegro only because of the military circumstances in order to secure Montenegrin Adriatic coast from Allied invasion. Keiper invited population of Montenegro to be loyal. Keiper emphasized that "it is not important if Montenegro is White or Green, it is important that Montenegro would not be Red".

=== Gendarmerie and militia ===
On 20 October 1943 Keiper invited all male population of Montenegro aged between 18 and 40 to join gendarmerie. He recruited 1,500 men in militia and 7,500 in gendarmerie which would support German forces to struggle against Communists. Keiper organized six battalions of gendarmerie in six Montenegrin counties controlled by Germans: Boka Kotorska, Bar, Cetinje, Podgorica, Danilovgrad and Nikšić. Keiper established two more battalions consisting of 3,000 former Chetniks from two counties occupied by the Communist forces: Kolašin and Šavnik. The commander of Gendarmerie was former artillery lieutenant Pero Marušić.

On 1 November Keiper issued an announcement that those who would "follow instructions of Communists or Dragoljub Mihailović" would be severely punished. Keiper treated Mihailović's Chetniks as enemies, but that did not prevent him from making secret arrangements in order to collaborate with them against the Communist-led Partisans.

=== National Administrative Council ===
On 9 November 1943 Germans established local government in form of National Administrative Council (Serbian: Народна Управа) led by Ljubomir Vuksanović. Pavle Đurišić began his cooperation with Keiper since June 1944. On 12 November 1943 Keiper published a threat that the German occupying forces would kill 20 hostages for each German soldier killed in Montenegro and 10 for each wounded German soldier.

After numerous people and priests evacuated from Cetinje, Keiper also did not stay in Cetinje.

== Sources ==
- Kroener, Bernhard R.; Müller, Rolf-Dieter; Umbreit, Hans (1990). Germany and the Second World War. Clarendon Press. ISBN 978-0-19-820873-0.
- Maletić, Mihailo (1976). Crna Gora. Književne novine.
- Miljanić, Gojko (1970). Nikšićki NOP odred. Vojnoizdavaćki zavod.
- Minić, Miloš (1993). Oslobodilački ili građanski rat u Jugoslaviji 1941-1945. Agencija "Mir". ISBN 9788682295013.
- Minić, Mihailo P. (1972). Tragedija bezumlja: druga sveska uz knjigu "Rasute kosti".
- Redžić, Vučeta (2002). Građanski rat u Crnoj Gori: Dešavanja od sredine 1942. godine do sredine 1945. godine. Stupovi.
- Parežanin, Ratko (1974). Moja misija u Crnoj Gori. Iskra.
- Živković, Dušan (1984). Prva bokeljska NOU brigada. Opštinski odbor SUBNOR-a.
- Đurišić, Mitar (1997). Primorska operativna grupa. Vojnoistorijski institut.
