= Metikoš =

Metikoš may refer to:

- Metikoš, Serbia, a village near Kraljevo
- Vladimir Metikoš (1899–1945), Croatian general
- Karlo Metikoš (1940–1991), Croatian musician, husband of Josipa Lisac
