= German-occupied territory of Montenegro =

1943–1944 Nazi occupation of Italian Montenegro

- Region of Yugoslavia occupied by Germany
- 1943–1944
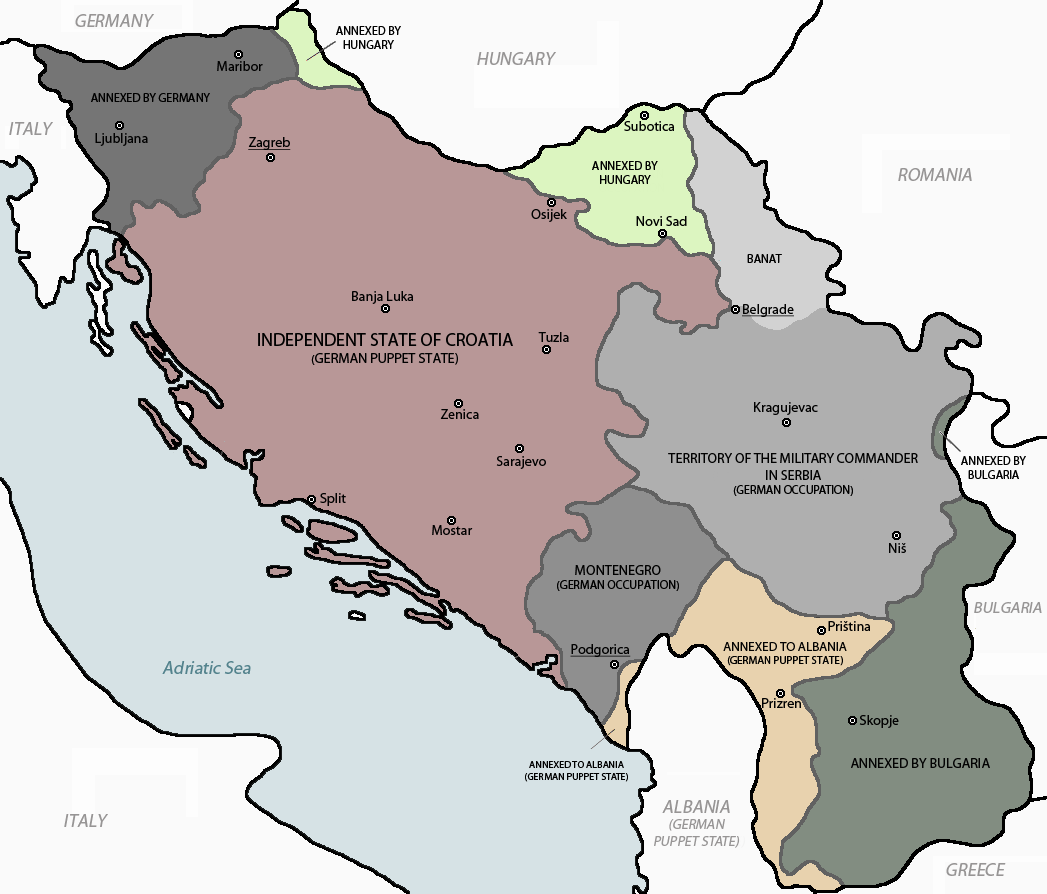
- Occupation and partition of Yugoslavia after the Italian surrender in September 1943. The German occupation of the former Italian governorate of Montenegro is shown in grey in the southern coastal region.
- History
  - Occupied by Germany: 12 September 1943
  - German withdrawal: 15 December 1944
| Preceded by | Succeeded by |
| Italian governorate of Montenegro | People's Republic of Montenegro |

During World War II, an area of the Kingdom of Yugoslavia previously occupied as the Italian governorate of Montenegro was occupied by German forces after the September 1943 Armistice of Cassibile, in which the Kingdom of Italy capitulated and joined the Allies. Italian forces retreated from the governorate, and from neighbouring Albania. German forces occupied Montenegro immediately, along with Albania, and the territory remained under German occupation until they and many of their local collaborators withdrew in December 1944.

Immediately after the Italian surrender, German forces occupied most of the former governorate, excepting some areas controlled by the Yugoslav Partisans. The territory was administered as an occupied territory under German Feldkommandtur (area command) No. 1040, commanded by Generalmajor Wilhelm Keiper. Until the spring of 1944, Keiper's area command was subordinated to a succession of higher headquarters; first the German General in Albania, then the V SS Mountain Corps, and then 2nd Panzer Army. Thereafter it was raised to an independent command and Keiper reported directly to the Commander-in-Chief in Southeast Europe Alexander Löhr. Keiper followed a similar practice to his Italian predecessor, and attempted to secure the assistance of the Montenegrin separatists known as the Greens, Chetniks who were aligned with the leader of the puppet government in the Territory of the Military Commander in Serbia, Milan Nedić, but not with the supreme Chetnik leader Draža Mihailović, and even Sandžak Muslims. From a group of representatives of these groups, in October he formed a National Administrative Council to help him administer the territory, chaired by Ljubomir Vuksanović. The council quickly overreached in attempting to bargain with Keiper regarding their powers, and were sharply reprimanded and advised that they were only an instrument of his occupation regime. The council's major concern was to secure food imports with German assistance. Nedić was willing to provide 900 t (890 long tons; 990 short tons) of food on a monthly basis, but the council needed German assistance with transportation. Ultimately, only 250–300 t (250–300 long tons; 280–330 short tons) was imported per month, a mere twenty percent of the amount the Italians had imported during their occupation. The result was that the population in large areas of the occupied territory were close to starvation for the duration of the German administration.

The Germans enlisted the assistance of the local gendarmerie, militia and some Chetniks attempt to control the occupied territory, but they proved inadequate to the challenge posed by the Partisans. Keiper then reluctantly co-opted the Montenegrin Chetnik leader Pavle Đurišić, who had been captured by the Germans in May 1943 and interned, but then escaped to Belgrade and was accepted as an ally by the Germans and Nedić. With German approval, Nedić appointed Đurišić to command the Montenegrin Volunteer Corps and sent him and the corps to assist Keiper. The German reticence was due to Đurišić's split allegiances; he relied on the Germans for logistical support but also owed allegiance to Nedić and Mihailović.

The Germans evacuated their troops from the occupied territory as part of their general withdrawal from the Balkans and towards the borders of the Third Reich. Đurišić accompanied the Germans as far as northeast Bosnia before leaving them to join Mihailović. After realising that Mihailović had no plan to save the remaining Chetnik forces, he left him and attempted to reach some other collaborationist forces gathering in western Yugoslavia. He and his corps were intercepted by superior forces of the fascist Independent State of Croatia in northwest Bosnia, and Đurišić was captured and executed. Many of his troops were also killed by NDH or Partisan forces.

After the Germans withdrew from the occupied territory and evacuated towards Austria, the fascist leader Sekula Drljević attempted to create a government-in-exile in the neighbouring Independent State of Croatia (NDH), which was a German quasi-protectorate. Drljević also created the Montenegrin National Army, a military force set up by him and the Croatian fascist leader Ante Pavelić. However, his government-in-exile, known as the "Montenegrin State Council", was dissolved after the fall of the NDH government.

The territory was taken over by the Yugoslav Partisans of Josip Broz Tito, and became part of Democratic Federal Yugoslavia.
