= Miloš Glišić =

Yugoslav military officer

- Милош Глишић
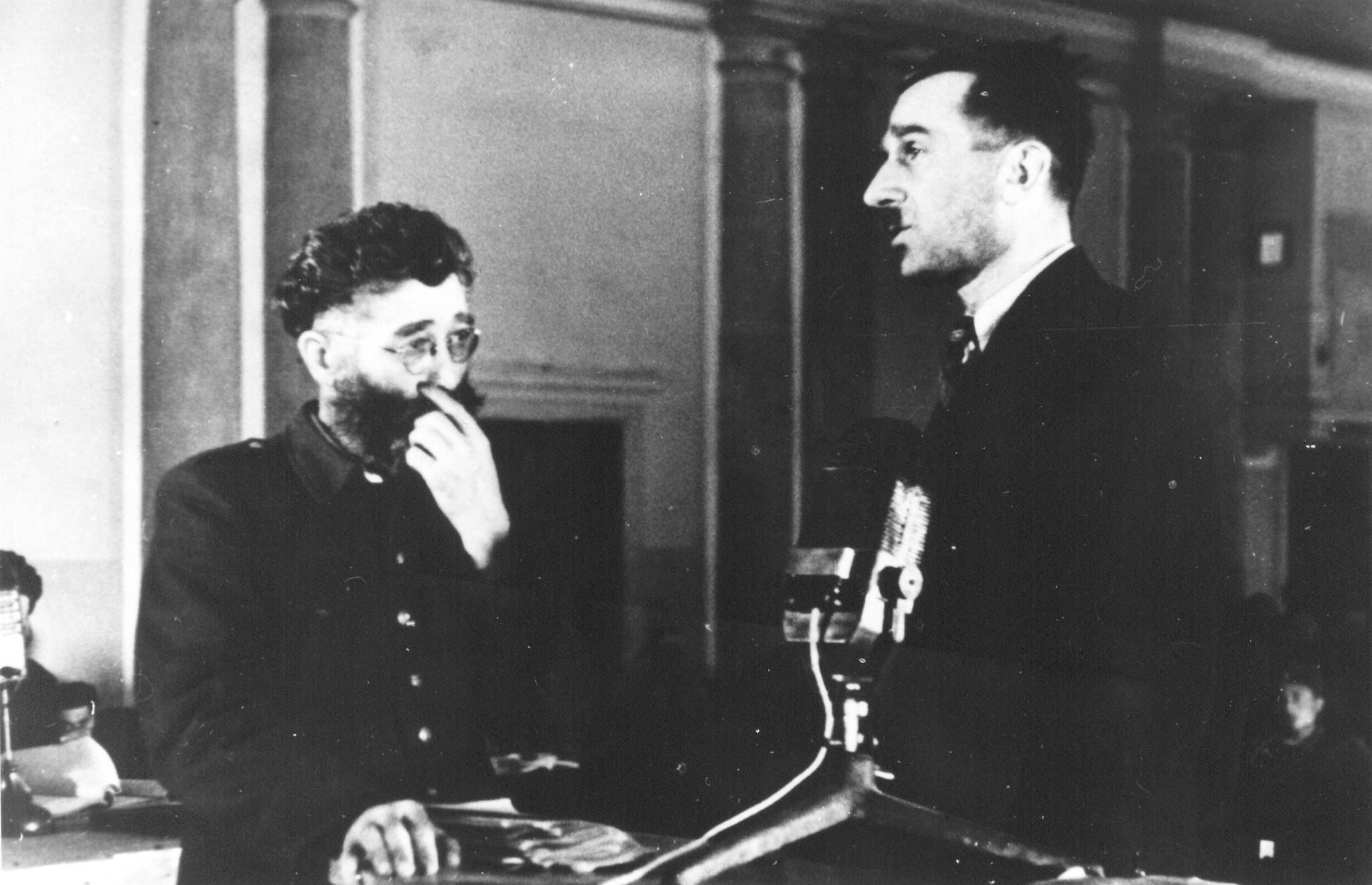
- Miloš Glišić (right) and Draža Mihailović at Belgrade Process, 1946
- Born: 27 February 1910; Požega, Kingdom of Serbia
- Died: 17 July 1946 (aged 36); Belgrade, PR Serbia, FPR Yugoslavia
- Cause of death: Execution by firing squad
- Military career
- Allegiance: Kingdom of Yugoslavia
- Rank: Captain (... - 6 February 1942); Major (6 February 1942 - ...)
- Commands: Požega Chetnik Detachment; Sandžak Military Chetnik Detachment (legalized by the Government of National Salvation)

Miloš Glišić (Serbian Cyrillic: Милош Глишић; 27 February 1910 – 17 July 1946) was Yugoslav military officer.

Glišić graduated at Military Academy in Belgrade in 1933 and since 1940 worked in General Staff. On 27 March 1941 he was one of pro-Western Serb military officers who conducted coup d'état and annulled Yugoslav military alliance with Axis powers. After Axis invasion of Yugoslavia he joined Chetniks of Draža Mihailović and participated in the uprising against German occupying forces. In October 1941, one of his actions against German troops in which he participated together with Partisans resulted in German reprisals known as Kragujevac massacre. At the end of 1941 he became a commander of the Požega Chetnik Detachment.

At the beginning of 1942 he became commander of the Sandžak Military Chetnik Detachment with its command in Nova Varoš and accepted to be legalized by the Government of National Salvation. In August 1942 Glišić was arrested, imprisoned and tortured by Gestapo because he sabotaged German attempts to disarm his unit and intensified his communication with Mihailović. In October 1942 he was taken to Mauthausen-Gusen concentration camp where he was until the end of World War II. In 1946 he was captured by OZNA and put on trial together with Mihailović, other prominent figures from Chetnik Movement and Nedić's regime. In July 1947 nine of them, including Glišić, were found guilty for collaboration with Axis and war crimes and executed on unknown location in Belgrade.

== Early life ==
Glišić was born on 27 February 1910 in Požega from mother Stanka and father Stojadin. Glišić was married and had two children.

Glišić was student of Military Academy in Belgrade in period 1927—33. After appropriate education in 1940 he worked in operational department of the General Staff of Royal Yugoslav Army with the rank of Captain. Glišić was one of the participants of the Yugoslav coup d'état conducted on 27 March 1941 by a group of pro-Western Serb military officers who were opposed to the military alliance with Axis powers.

== World War II ==
At the beginning of the World War II Glišić became a member of the staff of Požega Chetnik Detachment and soon promoted to the rank of Major. According to some sources he shared this position with Vučko Ignjatović and Marinković.

Glišić represented Chetniks at the negotiations with communists held in the first half of August 1941 in village Godovik, Užička Požega. The communist leader Čolović arrested Glišić after unsuccessful negotiations.

According to some sources, on 16 October 1941 Glišić, then deputy of Vučko Ignjatović, participated in the joint Partisan and Chetnik attack on German forces near Knić in which 10 German soldiers were killed and 26 wounded 26. This resulted in German reprisals known as Kragujevac massacre.

=== Legalised Chetnik commander ===
During mid-November 1941. Glišić was, along with few other Mihailović's officers, legalised and put under command of Milan Nedić. After Glišić's Požega Detachment entered Nova Varoš on 6 February 1942, he was promoted to position of major and named head of Sandžak Military Chetnik Detachment. Detachment had 700-800 fighters, it was seated in Nova Varoš and was split in two groups, one commanded by captain Vuk Kalaitović and other one by captain Nikola Kijanović. Unofficially trustee of Draža Mihailović was attached to the detachment. During April, Glišić started to cooperate with Chetnik leader Pavle Đurišić and worked constantly on improving relations with the Italians. However, the Germans were not satisfied as Glišić maintained contacts with illegal Chetniks units. Glišić was moderate in Chetnik movement, as he wanted to have an agreement with Muslim leaders in the region, something Đurišić considered unsustainable. On May 1 Glišić sent a letter to Nedić where he complained about constant spying of Germans and Italians and that he didn't like the idea of returning Nova Varoš to Italians, as he saw it as first phase of unification of Serbia, Sandžak and Montenegro. Relation between Nedić and Glišić was full of mistrust, because Glišić was and remained loyal to Mihailović, and always put Chetnik interest first. Sandžak Detachment participated in anti-partisan operations with Italian Army and Chetniks during which Chetnik troops committed pillaging, especially those under Kalaitović's command, which to Glišić damaged reputation of Chetniks. Following entrance of Glišić's troops into Šahovići, pro-Partisan houses were burnt down. During Glišić's rule in Nova Varoš Chetnik brothel was active, used by Chetnik soldiers and some civilians. Women at the brothel were captured members of Yugoslav Partisans, who possibly worked there to save their lives.

After expulsion of partisans out of Bijelo Polje County in May, Glišić gave orders to local population to report hidden partisans under threat of death and that attacking Chetniks and destroying of roads, bridges and telephone lines is punishable by death, after which he ordered return of normal functioning of all administrative organs and schools. Italians thought that Glišić didn't have right to give these orders, and quickly rejected them as illegitimate. Soon they demanded that Glišić leaves Nova Varoš altogether, which Glišić energetically rejected and threatened to fight Italians. Alongside men of Petar Baćović, Glišić's men took an operation in Bosnia in early June. Chetnik advancement was quicker than expected, and Partisans were forced to retreat from Foča to Gacko. Near Foča they encountered forces of Independent State of Croatia, took the town from them on June 10. This time Muslim population of the town remained untouched, unlike in other Chetnik captures of Foča. Germans and Ustaše pressured Italian governor of Montenegro Alessandro Pirzio Biroli to order Glišić to return the town on June 13 and Glišić had no choice, but to retreat to Nova Varoš. This worsened already bad relation between Italians and Glišić. Chetnik commander Pavle Đurišić wanted to Glišić's troops outside Sandžak, as he didn't want existence of parallel Chetnik organisation in the region. To that purpose, he agreed with Italians for his troops to guard right side of Lim, the job that until that point Glišić's troops did. On 26 June Glišić's main advisor and ally Vučko Ignjatović was killed by pro-Ljotić members of his Detachment. Glišić was visibly disturbed by Ignjatović's death and wanted to return to Serbia. Italians used this to take over the town from Glišić without a fight. Nedić ordered Glišić to cooperated fully with Italians from now on, however Glišić did not accept the obvious defeat. Presence of large number of legalised Chetniks in Nova Varoš was seen as unsustainable by Italians, especially those of Glišić's Požega Detachment. Under excuse of Ignjatović's murder, Nedić ordered dissolution of the detachment and demobilisation was to be done by Glišić. Glišić was dismissed from the post, but he stayed near Nova Varoš despite Nedić's orders to leave the area with several members of Sandžak Detachment. He admitted to Draža Mihailović that the town was lost on 11 July, however he stayed to check possibility of collaboration with Italians. Unfortunately for Glišić, German secret police investigated him. He was outed as a member of Mihailović's movement by one of Ignjatović's murderers. After murder of important ally of Ljotić in Čačak on 30 July, in which Glišić was involved, Gestapo took action against him. After Glišić's departure, influence of Nedić's government in Sandžak weakens and eventually disappears. Sandžak Detachment 'falls into chaos', most of its members either leave it for other Chetnik units or completely leaves the fight. Đurišić benefits the most, as he becomes main Mihailović's commander in the region.

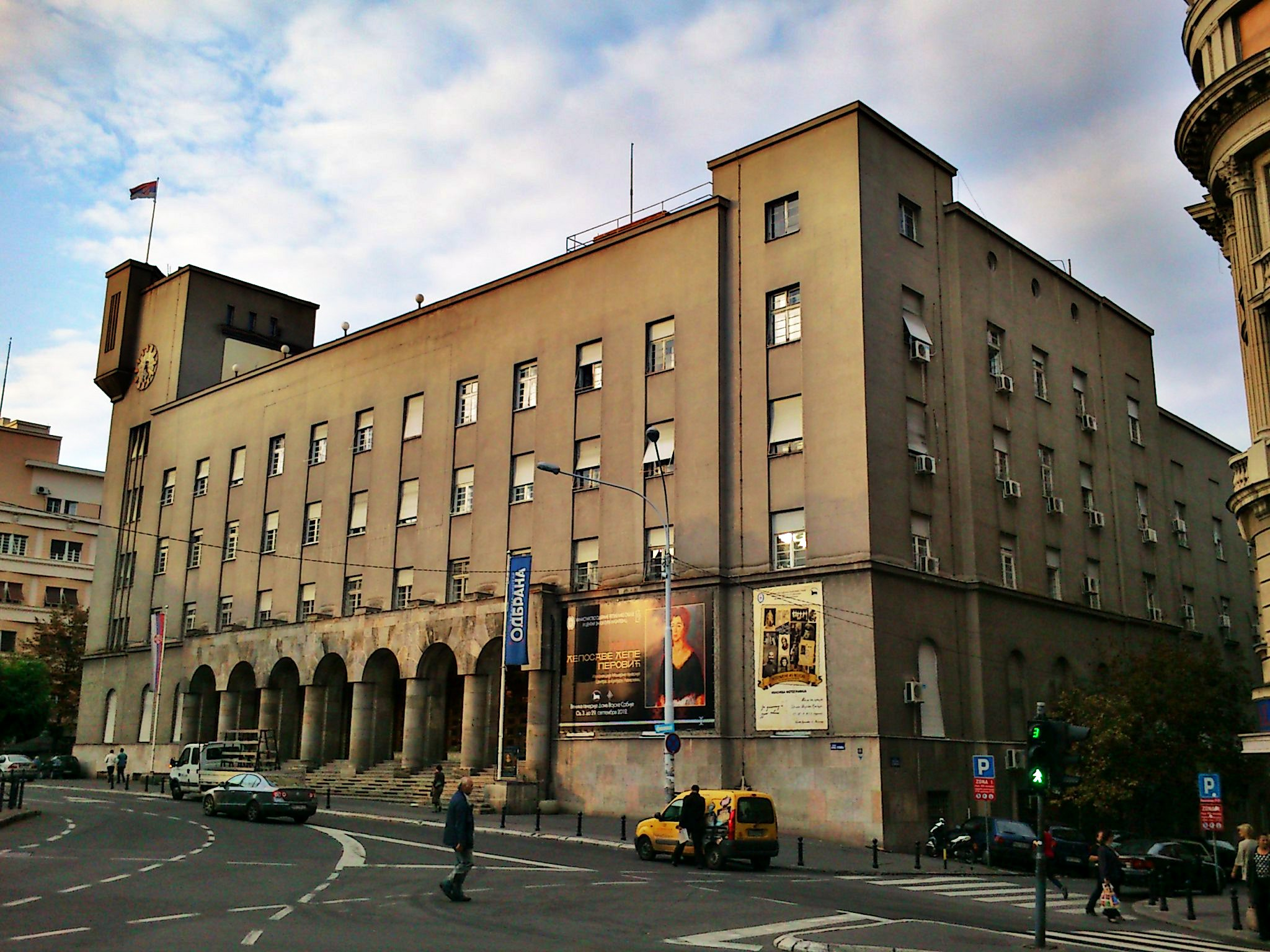
Gestapo Headquarter in Belgrade where Glišić was tortured, picture taken in 2012

=== Captured by Gestapo ===
On 2 August 1942 Glišić was arrested by Gestapo because they suspected that he sabotaged disarming of his detachment and communicated with Mihailović. He was interrogated and tortured in Belgrade Headquarter of Gestapo to reveal the location of Mihailović and Broz. When he refused to do so, Germans transported him to Mauthausen-Gusen concentration camp on 18 October 1942. Initially he was inmate of the camp in Mauthausen and since 28 June 1943 in Gusen from which he escaped in March 1945. He was soon captured and returned to Gusen where he stayed until 5 May 1945.

=== Captured by OZNA ===
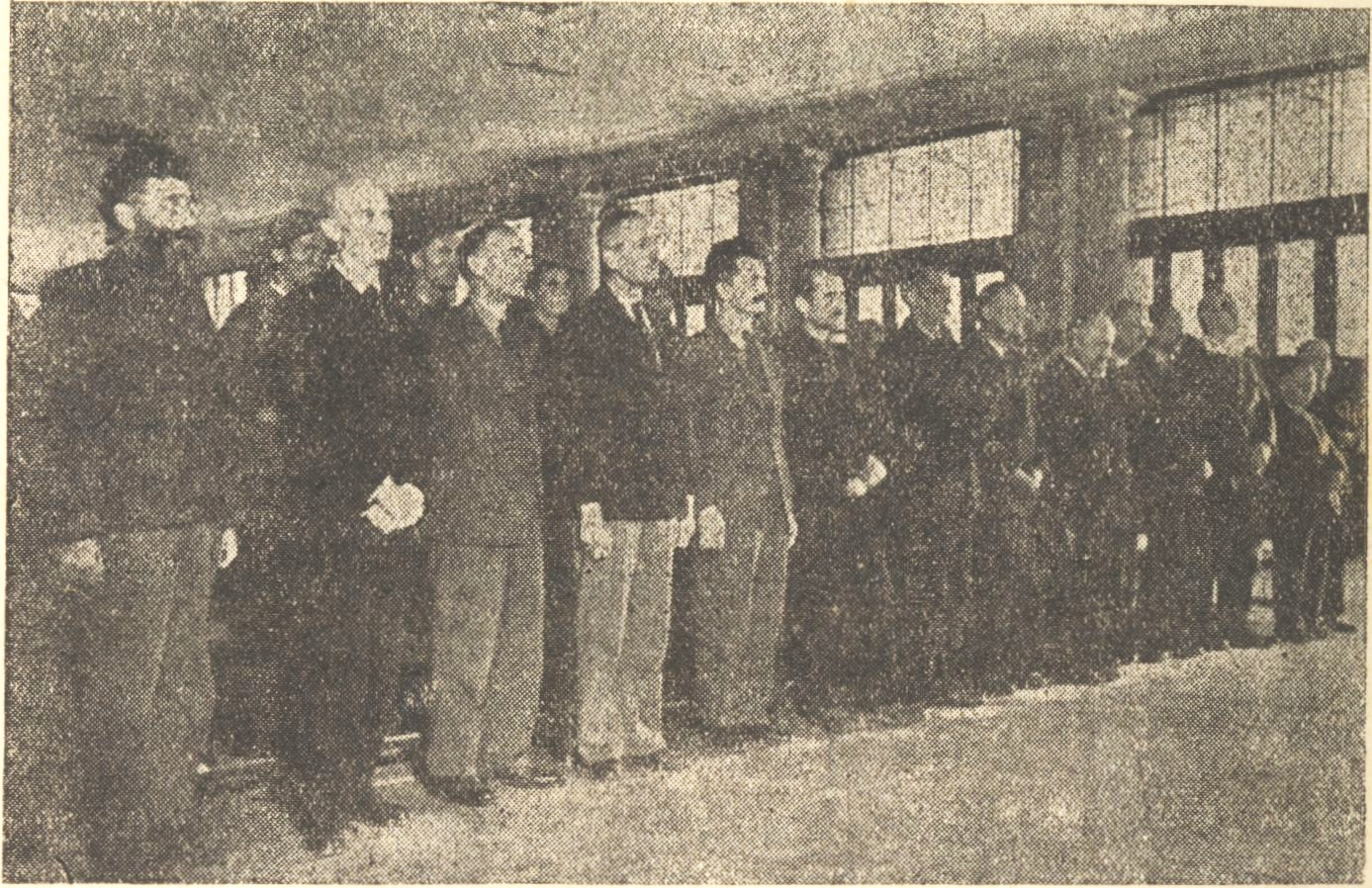
Glišić, sixth from the left, standing during reading of the judicial sentence

After being released from the Mauthausen-Gusen concentration camp Glišić stayed in Austria until January 1946 when he tried to illegally enter Yugoslavia near Maribor. He was captured by OZNA.

He was tried and sentenced to death in the 1946 Belgrade Process. He was executed in Belgrade at unknown location on the same night as Draža Mihailović, on 17 July 1946.

== Sources ==
- Ćuković, Mirko (1964). Sandžak: Na osnovu sakupljenog i obrađenog materijala knjigu napisao Mirko Ćuković. Nolit.
- Institut (1982). Beiträge zur Geschichte des Sozialismus. Institut za izučavanje radničkog pokreta.
- Pilčević, Đorđe (1971). Tragom aprilskih partizana. Udruženje boraca NOR-a opštine.
- Karapandžić, Bor. M. (1958). Gradanski rat u Srbiji.
- Живковић, Милутин Д. (2017). Санџак 1941–1943. Филозофски Фалултет, Универзитет у Београду.
