= Ljubomir Vuksanović =

- Born: Љубомир Вуксановић; 1875 or 1876; Prisoja in Andrijevica
- Died: 1945; Carinthia, Alpine and Danubian Gaue, Germany (modern-day Austria)
- Other name: Ljubo
- Occupations: Lawyer, Military Officer, Politician
- Known for: Chairman of the National Administrative Council in the German occupied Montenegro during World War II

Ljubomir "Ljubo" Vuksanović (Serbian Cyrillic: Љубомир "Љубо" Вуксановић) was a Montenegrin lawyer who was the chairman of the National Administrative Council (Serbian: Народна управа, German: Nationaler Verwaltungsausschuss) established by Germany in October 1943 in the German occupied territory of Montenegro and officially appointed on 10 November 1943. Vuksanović also held the position of Minister of Internal Affairs.

== Early life and pre-WWII period ==
Vuksanović was born in the village of Prisoja in the Andrijevica municipality in Montenegro. After he completed Gymnasium in Belgrade, he graduated from the Belgrade Law School. In 1909 he participated in the Kolašin Affair, for which he was put on trial and sentenced to 15 years in prison. Vuksanović managed to escape from prison and thereafter joined the Royal Serbian Army, where he received the rank of sergeant. He fought in the Macedonian front during the period 1915—18. During the period 1929—33 he lived in Peć as a lawyer. In 1933 Vuksanović was appointed as the Government agriculture commissioner in Skopje.

== During WWII ==
Vuksanović was the leader of the Whites.

Vuksanović considered Pavle Đurišić, a Montenegrin Chetnik commander, his enemy.

After the 1943 capitulation of Italy, Montenegro was swiftly occupied by Germany. The commander of the German troops appointed Vuksanović chairman of the National Administrative Council (Serbian: Народна управа, German: Nationaler Verwaltungsausschuss) and Minister of Internal Affairs. The council was established by Germany in October 1943 in the German occupied territory of Montenegro and officially appointed on 10 November 1943.

Vuksanović supported the idea of establishing a Montenegrin-Serbian Federation in Quisling order to "create solid foundations for the prosperous future of Serbs".

Following the communist invasion of Montenegro, Vuksanović was a member of the delegation which negotiated with Albanian anticommunist forces the retreat of the Montenegrin people and forces to Greece through Albania.

Vuksanović fled Montenegro with German forces in Autumn 1944. He reached Austrian Carinthia with a group of his fellow countrymen and died when the train in which he was travelling was bombed by Allied air forces.

== Sources ==
- Minić, Miloš (1993). Oslobodilački ili građanski rat u Jugoslaviji 1941-1945. Agencija "Mir". ISBN 9788682295013.
- Pajović, Radoje; Željeznov, Dušan; Božović, Branislav (1987). Pavle Đurišić, Lovro Hacin, Juraj Špiler. Centar za informacije i publicitet. ISBN 978-86-7125-006-1.
- Redžić, Vučeta (2002). Građanski rat u Crnoj Gori: Dešavanja od sredine 1942. godine do sredine 1945. godine. Stupovi.
- Nešković, Borivoje (1953). Istina o solunskom procesu. Narodna knjiga.
- Neubacher, Hermann (2008). Nikola Živković (ed.). Specijalni zadatak Balkan. More. ISBN 9788690616923.
