= Lim-Sandžak Chetnik Detachment =

- Active: June 1942 —
- Size: 15,349 men available for military service: 1,500 (standing force)
- Part of: Chetniks
- Engagements: World War II in Yugoslavia: Operation Schwarz

Commanders
- June 1942 — May 1943: Pavle Đurišić
- May 1943 —: Vojislav Lukačević

The Lim-Sandžak Chetnik Detachment (Serbian: Лимско—Санџачки Четнички Одред) was a military unit of Chetniks that was established in northern Montenegro and Sandžak at the end of June 1942, during World War II. In August 1942, it was commanded by Pavle Đurišić, and was the largest and most elite military unit of Draža Mihailović at that time.

== Establishment and initial structure ==
The Lim-Sandžak Chetnik Detachment was established by Pavle Đurišić, based on an agreement between Đorđe Lašić and Italian General Alessandro Pirzio Biroli signed on 24 July 1942 after about two months of negotiations. The agreement "legalised" the detachment with the Italian occupying forces. Chetniks that had not been "legalised" were much more numerous and important. The Italians tolerated groups of illegal Chetniks and gave them the status of a "national peasants' militia". The Lim-Sandžak Chetnik Detachment was a mobile unit consisting of four battalions, one for each region within the sector. Bijelo Polje, Berane, Andrijevica and Kolašin had one battalion each. According to the agreement, the detachment was authorised to a strength of 1,500 men who received a salary, food, clothes and arms from the Italians.

== Expansion ==
On 12 July 1942, Chetnik headquarters met in Zimonjića Kula to decide about the allocation of Chetnik commands and areas of responsibility, and Montenegro was divided into western and eastern sectors. Bajo Stanišić was appointed as the commander of the western sector, while Pavle Đurišić was appointed as the commander of the eastern sector, which matched the existing territory of his detachment. At a further conference held the following month, Đurišić's sector was expanded to include Prijepolje, Priboj, Nova Varoš and Sjenica.

After this expansion the Lim-Sandžak Chetnik Detachment was reorganized into four corps:

- Kom Corps
- Lim Corps
- Mileševa Corps

It was planned to include Dečane Corps, consisting of three brigades (Peć, Istok and Drenica) as part of the detachment, but this plan remained only on paper. According to Chetnik documents, the Lim-Sandžak Chetnik Detachment had 200 officers and 15,349 men available for military service. They were armed with 13,116 rifles, 51 light machine guns, 15 machine guns and 5 mortars. The Italians also authorised Đurišić to raise a gendarmerie in his sector, which was used to terrorise members and supporters of the Partisans and the population in general.

== Battles ==
As a part of the MVAC, the detachment participated in the Third Enemy Offensive against Communist Partisans.

In the middle of May 1943, prior to the formal commencement of Operation Schwarz, around 2,000 men from this detachment, including Đurišić, were captured by German forces. Vojislav Lukačević succeeded Đurišić as the commander of the remaining men of the detachment.

== Sources ==
- Pajović, Radoje (1977). Kontrarevolucija u Crnoj Gori: Četnički i federalistički pokret 1941–1945 (in Serbo-Croatian). Cetinje, Yugoslavia: Obod.
