= Montenegrin National Army =

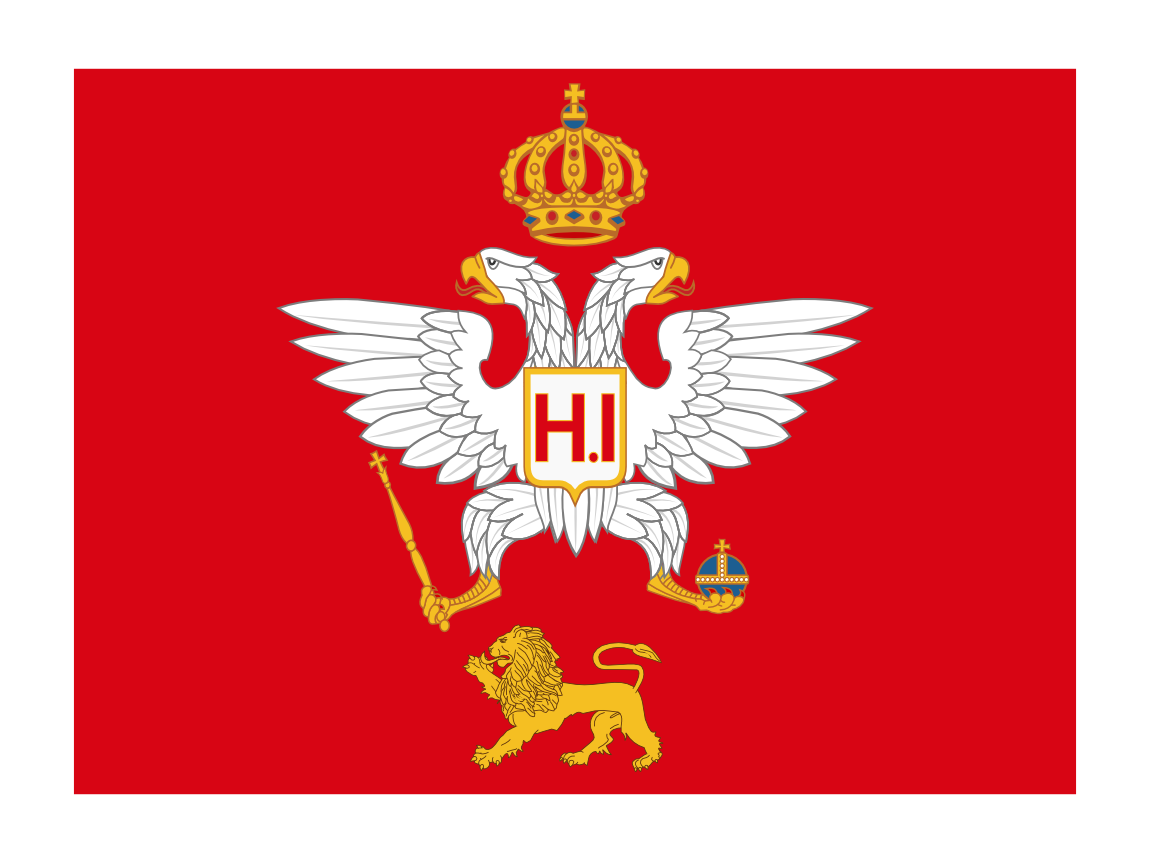
- The Montenegrin alaj-barjak was the army's flag
- Country: Montenegro
- Allegiance: Independent State of Croatia
- Engagements: Battle of Lijevče Field Battle of Poljana

Commanders
- Supreme Commander: Sekula Drljević
- Operational Commander: Pavle Đurišić

Montenegrin National Army (Serbian: Црногорска народна војска / Crnogorska narodna vojska) was an army whose supreme commander was Montenegrin collaborationist politician and separatist Sekula Drljević. When Pavle Đurišić retreated with his forces from Montenegro toward Slovenia in 1945, he made a safe-conduct agreement with Drljević. According to this contract Đurišićs forces were aligned with Drljević as the "Montenegrin National Army" with Đurišić retaining operational command, based on instructions of Drljević.

== Background ==
Montenegrin National Army was a result of Sekula Drljević's attempts to create an army consisting of Montenegrins who lived outside Montenegro.

== Establishment and actions ==
On 22 March 1945 Pavle Đurišić signed an agreement with Drljević. According to this agreement the Chetnik 8th Montenegrin Army was agreed to be under Drljevićs supreme command as the Montenegrin National Army. On 17 April 1945, after he returned to Zagreb, Drljević issued a proclamation with his political program and invited his "army" to fight both the new Yugoslavia and the Chetniks of Draža Mihailović.
