= Vladimir Metikoš =

Croatian general

Vladimir Metikoš (7 July 1899 – 24 September 1945) was a Croatian general in the then Independent State of Croatia (NDH).

Born in Banja Luka, he was posted during World War I to the Italian front as a lieutenant of the Austro-Hungarian Army. Later, he was an officer in the Royal Yugoslav Army. For the first months after the creation of NDH served as liaison officer with the German Command of Bosnian Divisional Area. Distinguished in the battles in Eastern Bosnia as the commander of 7th Jaeger Infantry regiment as of May 1942. As of 3 June 1944 commander of Lika Operational Area (4th Ustasha Active Brigade) and as of October 1944 commander of Banja Luka Brigade. Between December 1944 and the end of the War he served as the commander of the 6th Division.

In May 1945, Metikoš was one of the representatives of the Croatian Armed Forces who attempted to negotiate a surrender with the British at Bleiburg. The Supreme Court of Democratic Federative Yugoslavia condemned him to death on 19 September 1945, and he was executed five days later.
