= Pavle Đurišić =

World War II Chetnik leader (1909–1945)

Vojvoda Pavle Đurišić
- Павле Ђуришић
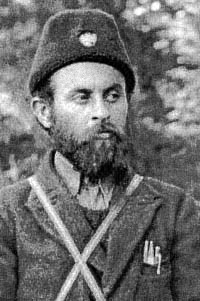
- Born: 9 July 1909; Podgorica, Principality of Montenegro
- Died: 21 April 1945 (aged 35); Jasenovac, Independent State of Croatia
- Military career
- Allegiance: Kingdom of Yugoslavia (1927–1941); Chetniks (1941–1945); Italy (1942–1943); Germany (1943–1945); Government of National Salvation (1943–1944); Montenegrin National Army (1945)
- Branch: Army
- Service years: 1927–1945
- Rank: Lieutenant colonel
- Commands: Lim-Sandžak Chetnik Detachment (1942–1943); Montenegrin Volunteer Corps (1944–1945); Montenegrin National Army (1945)
- Conflicts: World War II in Yugoslavia; Invasion of Yugoslavia; Uprising in Montenegro; Operation Weiss; Battle of Lijevče Field (executed)
- Awards: Order of Karađorđe's Star; Iron Cross (Germany)

Pavle Đurišić (Serbian Cyrillic: Павле Ђуришић, pronounced [pâːvle dʑǔriʃitɕ]; 9 July 1909 – 21 April 1945) was a Montenegrin Serb regular officer of the Royal Yugoslav Army who became a Chetnik commander (vojvoda) and led a significant proportion of the Chetniks in Montenegro during World War II. He distinguished himself and became one of the main commanders during the popular uprising against the Italians in Montenegro in July 1941, but later collaborated with the Italians in actions against the Communist-led Yugoslav Partisans. In 1943, his troops carried out several massacres against the Muslim population of Bosnia, Herzegovina, and the Sandžak in which an estimated 10,000 people were killed between January and March, including thousands of women, children, and the elderly. He then led his troops during their participation in the anti-Partisan Operation Weiss offensive alongside Italian forces. Đurišić was captured by the Germans in May 1943, escaped, and was recaptured.

After the capitulation of Italy, the Germans released Đurišić and he began collaborating with them and the Serbian puppet government. In 1944, he created the Montenegrin Volunteer Corps with assistance from the Germans, the leader of the Serbian puppet government, Milan Nedić, and the leader of the fascist Yugoslav National Movement, Dimitrije Ljotić. In late 1944, the German commander in Montenegro decorated him with the Iron Cross 2nd Class. Đurišić was killed following the Battle of Lijevče Field, after being captured by elements of the Armed Forces of the Independent State of Croatia near Banja Luka in an apparent trap set by them and Montenegrin separatist Sekula Drljević. Some of Đurišić's troops were killed either in this battle or in later attacks by the Partisans as they then continued their withdrawal west. Others attempted to withdraw to Austria; they were forced to surrender to the Partisans and were killed in the Kočevski Rog area of southern Slovenia in May and June 1945. Đurišić was a very able Chetnik leader; his fighting skills were respected by his allies and opponents alike.

== Early life ==
Pavle Đurišić was born on 9 July 1909 in Podgorica, Principality of Montenegro, where he was raised until the death of his father Ilija. His mother was Ivana (née Radović), from the Radović clan. According to some sources he was born in 1907. Đurišić was educated up to lower secondary school. Following his father's death, he moved to Berane, where he lived with his uncle Petar Radović, a judge and former Chetnik who had been a member of the band of Vuk Popović during the Macedonian Struggle. Đurišić attended a teacher training college in Berane for almost two years.

In 1927, Đurišić entered the 55th class of the Military Academy; he was commissioned as an infantry potporučnik (second lieutenant) in the Royal Yugoslav Army (Serbo-Croatian: Vojska Kraljevine Jugoslavije, VKJ) in 1930. He began his service in Sarajevo with the 10th Infantry Regiment Takovska and attended infantry officers' school. Đurišić remained in Sarajevo until 1934 when, upon his request, he was transferred to Berane where he served first as a platoon commander and later as a commander of the 1st Company of the 48th Infantry Regiment. Đurišić had a daughter named Ljiljana, who was born in 1937 but died in 1943.

On 7 April 1939, after the Italian invasion of Albania, Đurišić's company was sent to Plav near the Albanian border to gather intelligence. He established contact with individuals in the Italian protectorate of Albania and obtained intelligence, but the information he obtained was not very useful for the defense of Yugoslavia and he returned to Berane with his company. Contacts Đurišić made during this period would become important a few years later. Đurišić's son Ilija was born in 1940.

== World War II ==
=== Axis invasion and Italian occupation of Montenegro ===
In April 1941, Germany, Italy and Hungary invaded and occupied Yugoslavia. Montenegro was captured by the Germans, who soon withdrew, leaving the Italians to occupy it. The Montenegrins quickly developed grievances against the Italians related to the expulsion of Montenegrins from Kosovo and Vojvodina, the influx of refugees from other parts of Yugoslavia, and those fleeing Ustaše terror in the regions along the borders with Bosnia and Herzegovina. The Montenegrins also had grievances against the Italian annexation of important food-producing territory in Kosovo and a salt-producing facility at Ulcinj to Albania, and the economic damage inflicted on many Montenegrins by the temporary removal of Yugoslav banknotes of 500 dinars and above from circulation. By the time of the invasion, Đurišić had been promoted to the rank of kapetan prve klase (captain first class).

==== Uprising in Montenegro ====
In mid-July 1941, the Communist Party of Yugoslavia (Serbo-Croatian Latin: Komunistička Partija Jugoslavije, KPJ) in Italian-occupied Montenegro initiated a general uprising against the Italians. The uprising was triggered by the proclamation of a restored Kingdom of Montenegro headed by an Italian regent and led by the Montenegrin separatist Sekula Drljević and his supporters, known as "Greens" (zelenaši). The insurgents also included large numbers of Montenegrin Serb nationalists known as "Whites" (bjelaši), who "stood for close ties to Serbia". About 400 former VKJ officers, many of whom were willing to work with the communists, also took part. Some of the officers had recently been released from prisoner-of-war camps by the Germans and Italians, having been captured during the invasion. The VKJ officers assumed command, while the KPJ organised the revolt and provided political commissars. When the uprising commenced, Đurišić joined the committee that had been organised to lead military operations in the Berane district.

In the early phase of the uprising, the rebels seized control of small towns and villages. Đurišić fought alongside communist insurgents, and led a successful attack on Berane. During the heaviest fighting, he distinguished himself, and emerged as one of the main commanders of the uprising. After nearly two days of house-to-house fighting to capture Berane, he was involved in negotiating the surrender of the surviving Italian troops. Following the Italian surrender, he objected to the instructions he received from the communists regarding the handling of Italian prisoners. During the uprising, Đurišić also led fighting against Drljević's forces. Following the Italians' removal from the Lim valley, Đurišić urged rebels to march on Rožaje and Kosovska Mitrovica and attack the Muslims and Albanians there, whom he considered "anational". The leaders of the uprising made it clear they considered such an action unacceptable.

The other main commanders of the uprising included the former VKJ officers Colonel Bajo Stanišić and Major Đorđije Lašić. Within six weeks, a force of 67,000 Italian troops, assisted by Muslim and Albanian irregulars from border areas who provided flank security, regained control of all towns and communication routes in Montenegro. General Alessandro Pirzio Biroli, the Italian military governor of Montenegro, issued orders to crush the revolt but directed his forces to avoid "acts of revenge and useless cruelty". Nevertheless, dozens of villages were burned, hundreds were killed, and between 10,000 and 20,000 inhabitants were interned during the suppression of the revolt. For a while, the Muslim and Albanian irregulars were permitted to pillage and torch villages. As soon as the Italians launched their offensive, politicians in Berane abandoned their support for the uprising and began criticising it. Former VKJ officers deserted their units and Đurišić left the military committee organising the uprising in the Berane district. The politicians and officers formed their own committees and approached the Italians to express their loyalty and denounce the communists.

A division developed between the uprising's communist leadership and the nationalists who were participating. The nationalists recognised the uprising had been crushed and wanted to stop fighting, while the communists were determined to continue the struggle. In late 1941, the nationalists contacted the Italians and offered to help them fight the communists, who had since been renamed Partisans. The nationalists—including Đurišić, who was popular in his own Vasojevići tribe of northern Montenegro—subsequently withdrew into the hinterland. They sought to avoid provoking the Italians and protect the mountain villages if they were attacked. In northern Montenegro, there was a marked distinction between the communists and nationalists. The nationalists had closer ties with Serbia and exhibited a "frontier" mentality towards Muslims. The communists wished to continue the uprising by turning against their class enemies. Ustaše manipulation of the Muslims in the Sandžak and the expulsion of Serbs from areas annexed by Albania made Đurišić and his Chetniks impatient to attack Muslims and Albanians. They subsequently turned on the Muslims and Albanians in the region. The uprising continued with reduced intensity until December 1941. In 1941, Đurišić was awarded the Order of Karađorđe's Star by the Yugoslav government-in-exile on the recommendation of Chetnik leader Draža Mihailović.

==== Mihailović's instructions ====
In October 1941, Mihailović appointed Đurišić as his commander for all regular and reserve troops in central and eastern Montenegro and parts of the Sandžak. In early November, the nationalist leaders in Montenegro quickly became aware of the split between the Chetniks and Partisans in Serbia; later that month they sent Đurišić to visit Mihailović. During this visit, Đurišić received verbal orders from Mihailović and was appointed as the commander of all Chetnik detachments in the Sandžak. Lašić was appointed commander of all Chetnik forces in Old Montenegro. Đurišić's appointment was also included as part of instructions dated 20 December 1941 that were received from Mihailović. The instructions included the following objectives:

- the struggle for the liberty of our whole nation under the sceptre of His Majesty King Peter II;
- the creation of a Great Yugoslavia and within it of a Great Serbia which is to be ethnically pure and is to include Serbia [meaning also Macedonia], Montenegro, Bosnia and Herzegovina, Srijem, the Banat, and Bačka;
- the struggle for the inclusion into Yugoslavia of all still un-liberated Slovene territories under the Italians and Germans (Trieste, Gorizia, Istria and Carinthia) as well as [of areas now under Bulgaria], and northern Albania with Scutari;
- the cleansing of the state territory of all national minorities and anational elements;
- the creation of contiguous frontiers between Serbia and Montenegro, as well as between Serbia and Slovenia by cleansing the Muslim population from the Sandžak and the Muslim and Croat populations from Bosnia and Herzegovina.

These instructions stated that the objectives of the Partisans meant that there could be no cooperation between them and the Chetniks. They also appointed Đurišić as a Chetnik vojvoda. Some historians have challenged the authenticity of these instructions; they say the document was a forgery made by Đurišić after he failed to reach Mihailović. Other historians either do not mention any controversy about the provenance of the instructions, mention evidence supporting their authenticity, or explicitly state they consider them to be authentic.

==== Collaboration with the Italians against the Partisans in Montenegro ====
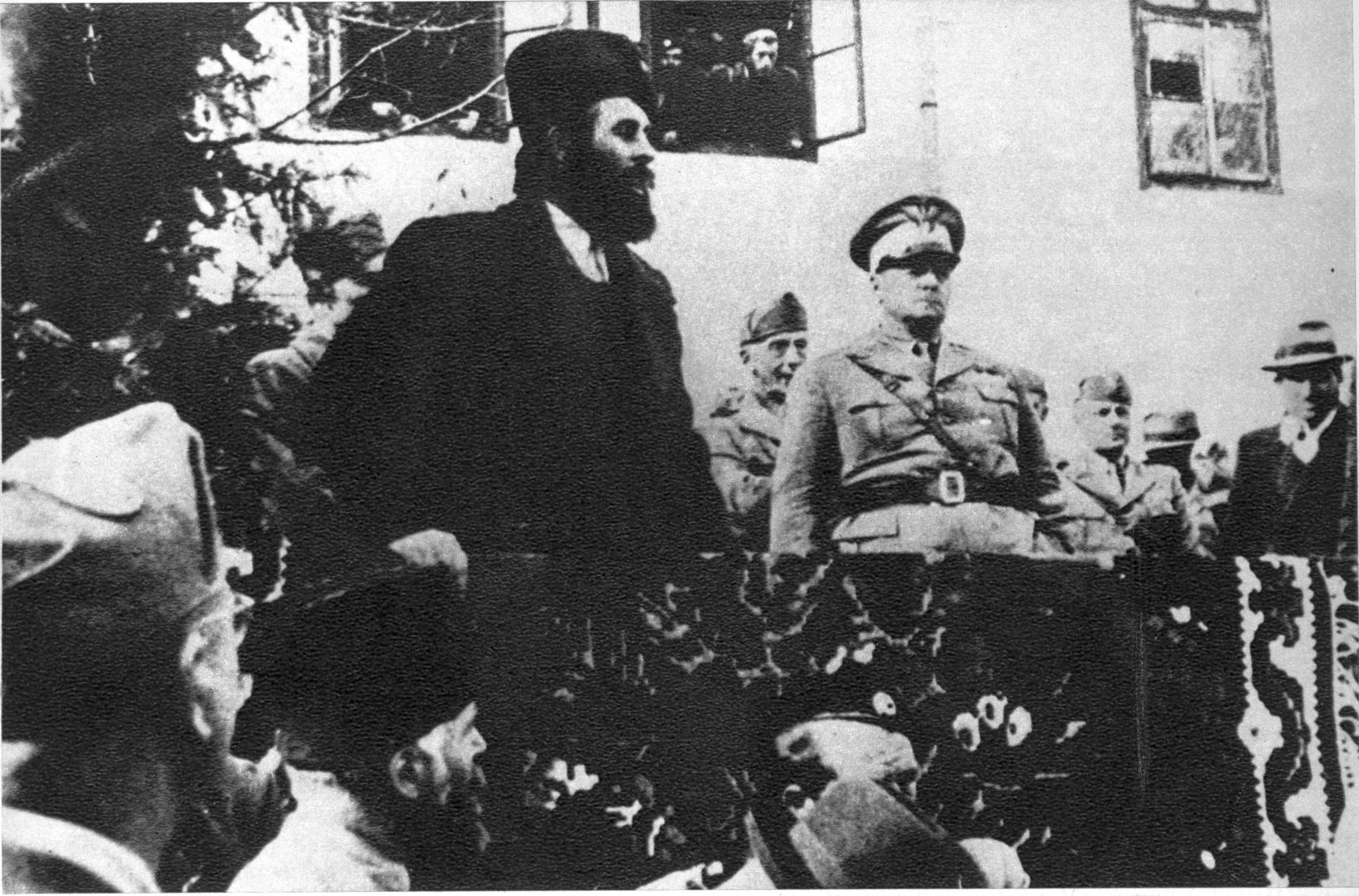
Đurišić making a speech to the Chetniks in the presence of General Pirzio Biroli, Italian governor of Montenegro

In January 1942, Đurišić met with representatives of Generale di brigata (Brigadier) Silvio Bonini, the commander of the Italian 19th Infantry Division Venezia. Đurišić's brother Vaso was responsible for liaising with the Italian division and was stationed at their headquarters in Berane; at this meeting, Đurišić was granted freedom of action against the Partisans in the division's area of responsibility An agreement between Đurišić and the Italian representatives was signed by Vaso on Đurišić's behalf. That March, Đurišić again met with the staff of the division. In the same month, he assembled a group of former VKJ officers, politicians and other non-communists, and passed on Mihailović's instructions. Mihailović codenamed Đurišić's headquarters "Mountain Staff No. 15"; (Note: According to Milazzo, Lašić was designated as commander of "Mountain Staff No. 15".) Đurišić selected the village of Zaostro for its location. Bonini wrote a letter to Italian Montenegro Command that Đurišić

In January, a Chetnik force led by Lašić conducted successful operations against the Partisans in the Andrijevica district, but Lašić suffered a severe head wound during the fighting. Lašić's wounding meant Đurišić soon became the most prominent and important Chetnik commander in Montenegro. By 5 January, Đurišić assumed command over the Berane district and established seven Chetnik detachments in the area. Soon after, a district political committee with responsibility for organising propaganda and finding recruits was formed. Đurišić soon gained control of all anti-communist militia groups in the Berane district, totalling 500 men, and two smaller groups from Kolašin and Bijelo Polje totalling 120 men. On 13 January, after a week of preparation, he launched attacks on two Partisan battalions operating in the Berane district. After four days of fighting, Đurišić succeeded in almost completely clearing the district of Partisans with the help of Italian troops and Muslim militias. By 24 January, Đurišić's forces captured the remaining Partisan-held village in the district, killing 15 Partisans and executing 27 who had been captured. This effectively eliminated the remaining Partisan presence in Berane.

By March, Đurišić had demonstrated to the Italians that he was uncompromising towards the Partisans and that his detachments were expanding beyond the division's area of responsibility. An agreement was negotiated between Đurišić and General Biroli, the military governor and commander of Italian troops in Montenegro. This agreement, signed by Đurišić, is also related to the area of operations of the 19th Infantry Division Venezia. The Italians agreed to supply Đurišić and his troops with arms, food, and wages. The agreement obliged Đurišić to:

- lead the fight against the communists and their supporters;
- maintain contact with the Italian military authorities, so that his actions were carried out in accordance with Italian instructions. North of Lijeva Rijeka, Đurišić agreed to clear his actions with Bonini, and south of Lijeva Rijeka he was to coordinate with Biroli;
- maintain order and guarantee the safety of roads in his area of operations;
- never attack Italian troops and limit his activities to fighting against the communists;
- return all arms provided by the Italians, except for those needed to maintain order, after the destruction of the communists.

Despite his possession of Mihailović's instructions, Đurišić initially had minimal influence on the non-communist elements of the Montenegrin resistance and was unable to develop an effective strategy against the Italians or Partisans in the months after his return to Montenegro. In early 1942, his Chetnik detachment became more active against local Muslims, especially in eastern Montenegro and the Sandžak. The Partisans occupied Kolašin in January and February 1942, and turned against all real and potential opposition; they killed about 300 people and threw their corpses into pits they called the "dogs' cemetery". Because of this and other examples of communist terror, some Montenegrins turned against the Partisans. On 23 February, Đurišić captured Kolašin and held it as a Chetnik bastion until May 1943. Chetnik terror against political opponents intensified following Đurišić's capture of Kolašin on 23 February. Captured Partisans and sympathisers were typically killed on the spot, including 17 wounded Partisans captured in the village of Lipovo. Show trials were staged in March and April for some of the town's prominent citizens, whom the Chetniks considered opponents, and many known or suspected communists were sentenced to death and executed. Đurišić established a Chetnik prison in Kolašin, in which 2,000 people were incarcerated and tortured. At least 74 prisoners were shot at Breza near Kolašin. In late April 1943, 313 inmates of Kolašin Chetnik prison were handed to Italians; 27 of these were executed during an Italian mass execution of 180 hostages on 25 June 1943.

In May 1942, Đurišić attacked and defeated the last significant Partisan detachment in Montenegro. In June 1942, he collaborated with the Ustaše in Foča in south-eastern Bosnia. After being forced out of Serbia by the Germans, Mihailović arrived in Montenegro as the Italians and Chetniks were fighting the Partisans. Mihailović was accompanied by his staff and a British Special Operations Executive (SOE) liaison officer. He eventually established his base in the village of Gornje Lipovo, a few miles from Đurišić's headquarters at Kolašin. Mihailović and his staff had few troops and relied on Đurišić for protection. Soon after Mihailović arrived in Montenegro, Đurišić told Mihailović's SOE liaison officer that he was available to act independently and in defiance of Mihailović. Đurišić and the other Chetnik commanders in Montenegro nominally recognised Mihailović as their supreme commander but they rarely obeyed him.

In June following Chetnik capture of Nova Varoš, dispute happened between Chetnik major Miloš Glišić and Italian to whom town should belong. Glišić didn't want to give control of the town to Italians and was ready to fight them for the town. Chetnik High command representative Ostojić and Đurišić were for peaceful transition of control to Italians. Đurišić, who was in argument with Glišić, made an agreement with General Esposito that Glišić's troops leave Sandžak completely and that Đurišić's troops secure right flank of Drina river, job which Glišić's men did up to this point. Majority of Glišić's troops were forced to flee the region and Glišić will soon be arrested by Gestapo, leaving Đurišić as main Chetnik commander in the region.

On 24 July 1942, Blažo Đukanović, senior commander of all Chetnik forces in Montenegro, signed a comprehensive agreement with Biroli which officially organised and recognised three Chetnik "flying detachments" as Italian auxiliary troops for use against the Partisans. These detachments were supplied, armed, and paid by the Italians; they included 4,500 Chetniks, 1,500 of whom were under the command of Đurišić. The Chetniks became an important part of the Italian occupation regime in Montenegro. The existing "Montenegrin Chetnik committee", which was led by the Brigadier General Đukanović and to which Đurišić was aligned, was recognised by the Italians as the "Nationalist Committee of Montenegro", whose only political aims were to combat the communists and others opposed to the Italian occupation, and "maintain law and order". Arrangements were to be made by mutual understanding for pay, rations, weaponry, and aid to the families of Chetniks.

During the rest of 1942, Italian operations in conjunction with their Chetnik auxiliaries forced the remaining Partisans out of Montenegro, after which the Italians used the Chetnik auxiliaries to police the countryside. For most of this time, Đurišić operated fairly independently in northern Montenegro; he was described as "a law unto himself". In December 1942, Chetniks from Montenegro and the Sandžak met at a conference in the village of Šahovići near Bijelo Polje. The conference was dominated by Đurišić; its resolutions expressed extremism and intolerance, and its agenda focused on restoring the pre-war status quo in Yugoslavia implemented in its initial stages by a Chetnik dictatorship. It also laid claim to parts of the territory of Yugoslavia's neighbours. At this conference, Mihailović was represented by Major Zaharije Ostojić, his chief of staff, who had previously been encouraged by Mihailović to wage a campaign of terror against the Muslim population living along the borders of Montenegro and the Sandžak. One outcome of the conference was the decision to destroy the Muslim villages in the Čajniče district of Bosnia.

=== Operation White and cleansing actions ===
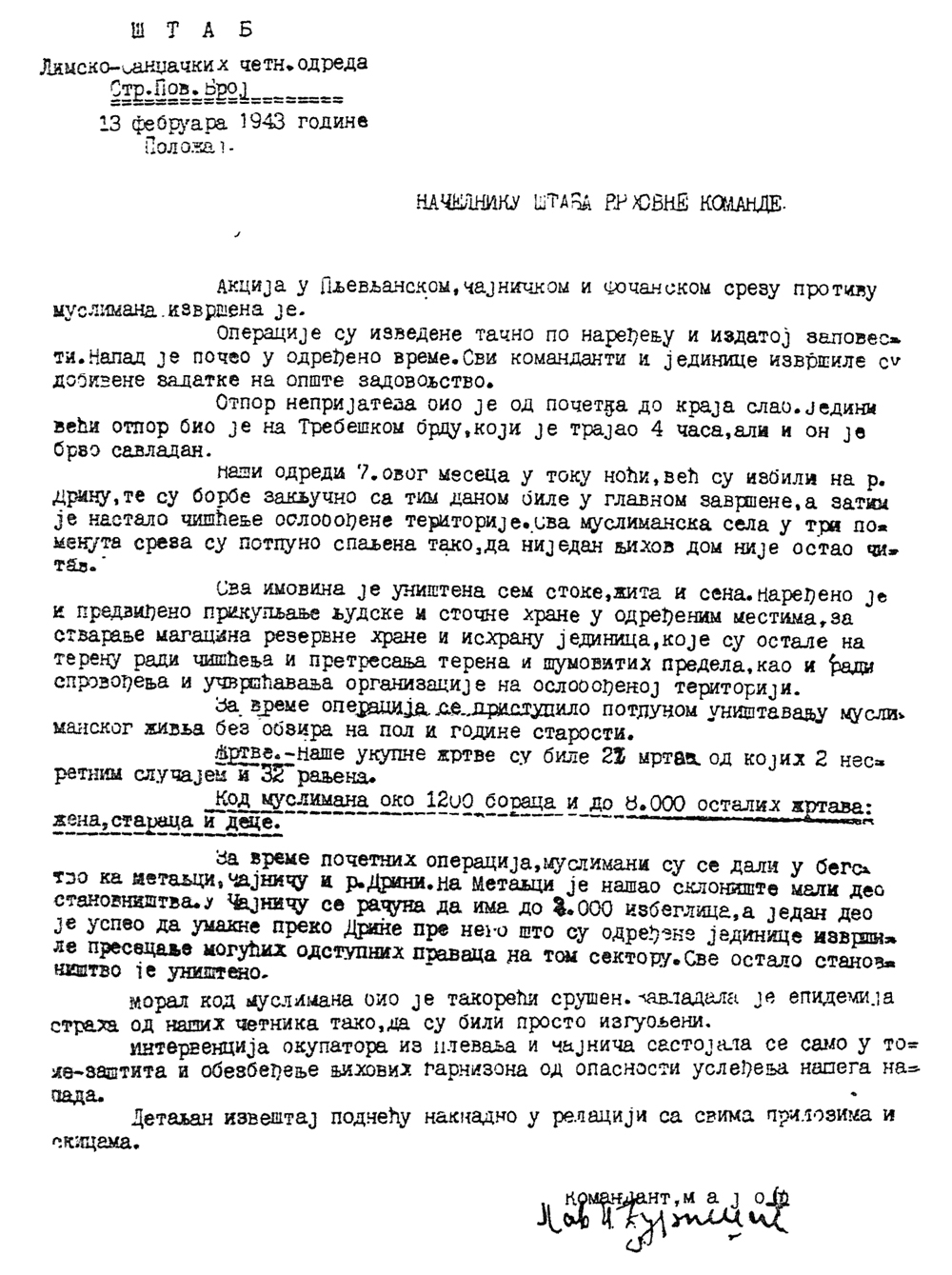
Đurišić's report of 13 February 1943 informing Mihailović of the massacres of Muslims in the counties of Čajniče and Foča in southeastern Bosnia and in the county of Pljevlja in the Sandžak

In December 1942, concerned about the possibility of Allied forces landing in the Balkans, the Germans began planning an anti-Partisan offensive in Bosnia and Herzegovina codenamed "Operation Weiss" ('White'). The size of the planned offensive required the involvement of both the Croatian Home Guard and the Italians. Late in the planning, the Italians began to prepare and equip Chetnik detachments, including that of Đurišić, for involvement in the operation. In early January 1943, the Chetnik Supreme Command ordered Montenegrin Chetnik units to carry out "cleansing operations" against Ustaša forces and Muslim militias in the Bijelo Polje county of north-eastern Montenegro. On 10 January Đurišić reported that Chetniks under his command had burned down 33 Muslim villages, killed 400 Muslim militiamen, and had also killed about 1,000 Muslim women and children.

As Italian auxiliaries, Đurišić's detachment was so dependent on the Italians for arms and transport that it had not left Montenegro until 18 January 1943, two days before the first phase of Operation White was to begin. On 3 January 1943, Ostojić issued orders to "cleanse" the Čajniče district of Ustaše–Muslim organisations. According to the historian Radoje Pajović, Ostojić produced a detailed plan that avoided specifying what was to be done with the district's Muslim population. Instead, these instructions were to be given orally to the responsible commanders. Delays in the movement of Chetnik forces into Bosnia to participate in Operation White alongside the Italians enabled the Chetnik Supreme Command to expand the planned "cleansing" operation to include the Pljevlja district in the Sandžak and the Foča district of Bosnia. A combined Chetnik force of 6,000 divided into four detachments and commanded by Vojislav Lukačević, Andrija Vesković, Zdravko Kasalović and Bajo Nikić was assembled. Mihailović ordered all four detachments to be placed under the overall command of Đurišić.

In early February 1943, during their advance north-west into Herzegovina in preparation for their involvement in Operation White, the combined Chetnik force killed large numbers of Muslims in the area of Pljevlja, Foča and Čajniče. In a report to Mihailović dated 13 February 1943, Đurišić wrote that his Chetniks had killed about 1,200 Muslim combatants and about 8,000 women, children and the elderly, and destroyed all property except livestock, grain and hay, which they seized. Đurišić reported that:

The operations were executed exactly according to orders. [...] All the commanders and units carried out their tasks satisfactorily. [...] All Muslim villages in the three above mentioned districts are entirely burnt, so that not one of the houses remained undamaged. All property has been destroyed except cattle, corn and hay. In certain places the collection of fodder and food has been ordered so that we can set up warehouses for reserved food for the units which have remained on the terrain in order to purge it and to search the wooded areas as well as establish and strengthen the organization on the liberated territory. During operations complete annihilation of the Muslim population was undertaken, regardless of sex and age.

— Pavle Đurišić

About 500 Muslims, mostly women, children and the elderly, were killed in Goražde in March, and several women were raped. An estimated 10,000 people were killed in the anti-Muslim operations commanded by Đurišić between January and February 1943. The casualty rate would have been higher if many Muslims had not already fled the area—most to Sarajevo—when the February action began. Chetnik casualties during the operations were reported as 36 killed and 58 wounded. The orders for the "cleansing" operation stated that the Chetniks should kill all Muslim fighters, communists and Ustaše, but that they should not kill women and children. According to Pajović, these instructions were included to ensure there was no written evidence for the killing of non-combatants. On 8 February, one Chetnik commander made a notation on his copy of written orders issued by Đurišić that the detachments had received additional orders to kill all Muslims they encountered. On 10 February, the commander of the Pljevlja Chetnik Brigade told one of his battalion commanders that he was to kill everyone in accordance with the orders of their highest commanders. According to Tomasevich, despite Chetnik claims that this and previous "cleansing actions" were countermeasures against aggressive Muslim activities, all circumstances point to it being Đurišić's partial achievement of Mihailović's previous directive to clear the Sandžak of Muslims.

By the end of February 1943, Đurišić's Chetniks were resisting Partisan attempts to move east from the Neretva river. After the Battle of Neretva, during which the Partisans forced a crossing of the river against faltering Chetnik opposition, Đurišić's detachment of about 2,000 fighters fell back to Kalinovik, where they were "badly mauled" by the Partisan 2nd Proletarian Division in late March. Falling back further towards the Drina river, Đurišić had assembled about 4,500 Bosnian and Montenegrin Chetniks around Foča by April but was in desperate need of supplies. Shortly after this, the Italians withdrew most of their troops from Foča and abandoned most of the Sandžak. For the rest of April 1943, Đurišić fought a holding action against the Partisans along the Drina river with his 3,000 remaining fighters.

=== Capture ===
The Germans followed up Operation White with a further offensive, codenamed "Operation Schwarz" ('Black'), whose objectives were the "disarming of all Chetniks and the destruction of all Partisans in Montenegro and Sandžak", to secure important bauxite, lead, and chromium mines. According to Tomasevich, the main reasons for the offensive were the threat of an Allied landing in the Balkans and the need to eliminate resistance groups that could assist the Allies. In early May 1943, the Germans entered the Sandžak and eastern Montenegro area. Đurišić withdrew to Kolašin with about 500 fighters and joined forces with Serbian Chetniks commanded by Dragutin Keserović.

On 10 May 1943, Oberstleutnant (Lieutenant Colonel) Heinz, commander of the 4th Regiment of the Brandenburg Division, met Đurišić at Kolašin with the intent of engaging him to help the Germans against the Partisans. Đurišić said he was willing to do this, and once the Partisans were defeated he said he would be ready to fight alongside the Germans on the Russian Front. During the meeting, Đurišić told Heinz that Mihailović had left Kolašin at the end of 1942 and that he refused to accept Mihailović's current policy. Đurišić said Mihailović had been distracted by propaganda and was over-rated, and described him as "an unsteady visionary wandering through the land". Đurišić also stressed that Josip Broz Tito and his Partisans were the only serious enemy. On 11 May 1943, Heinz submitted a proposal to General der Infanterie (Lieutenant General) Rudolf Lüters, the German Commanding General in Croatia, regarding the Chetniks who had been "legalised" by the Italians. He suggested the Germans also "legalise" Đurišić's Chetniks and use them to disarm "non-legalised" Chetniks groups. Heinz also proposed that after the Partisans had been destroyed, the Germans "legalise" only weak detachments of Đurišić's Chetniks. Subsequent events indicate Heinz's approach to Đurišić may not have been authorised by his superiors and that his suggestions were not acted upon.

On 14 May 1943, a forward detachment of the German 1st Mountain Division entered Kolašin and seized Đurišić by deceiving the Italian troops who were guarding his headquarters. Đurišić and the Chetniks did not resist their capture and there were no casualties. The Italians vigorously protested Đurišić's capture but the Germans overruled them. With the capture of Đurišić's Chetniks and another Chetnik group west of Kolašin a few days later, Operation Schwarz became an almost entirely anti-Partisan operation. Đurišić was driven away in a vehicle carrying Red Cross markings; he was then flown from Berane to a prisoner-of-war camp at Stryi in the Lviv region of Galicia which formed part of the German occupation area of the General Government. He escaped three months later and was recaptured by the authorities of the Serbian puppet government in October 1943 while attempting to cross the Danube near Pančevo in southern Banat. He was handed over to the Germans and held in the Gestapo prison in Belgrade.

=== Release and return to Montenegro ===
In September 1943, the Italians capitulated and the Germans occupied Montenegro, establishing an area command (German: Feldkommandantur 1040) under Generalmajor (Brigadier) Wilhelm Keiper. Soon after, the German Special Envoy in Belgrade, Hermann Neubacher, along with the leader of the puppet government in the German-occupied territory of Serbia, Milan Nedić, and the German Military Commander in south-east Europe, General Hans Felber, arranged for Đurišić to be released. Neubacher had developed a plan to establish a union between Serbia and Montenegro, which he called a "Greater Serbian federation". He submitted it to Foreign Minister Joachim von Ribbentrop in October 1943. Đurišić was an important part of this plan. He was well regarded by the Chetniks and pro-Chetnik populace in Montenegro, particularly after Stanišić and Đukanović had been killed on 18 October, following the Partisans' assault on their headquarters at Ostrog monastery. Neubacher, Nedić and Felber believed Đurišić could be used to fight the Partisans in Montenegro and help form closer relations between Serbia and Montenegro. Although Neubacher's plan did not gain Hitler's approval, Đurišić received supplies including arms and ammunition from the Germans and in November 1943 he returned to Montenegro to fight against the Partisans. At this time he established closer ties with Dimitrije Ljotić, whose Serbian Volunteer Corps (SDK) provided him with weapons, food, typewriters, and other supplies. He also worked with Nedić, who promoted him to the rank of lieutenant colonel, and appointed him assistant to the commander of the SDK. According to Pajović, Đurišić was promoted in early to mid-1944 by the Yugoslav government-in-exile on the advice of Mihailović.

=== Collaboration with the Germans against the Partisans in Montenegro ===
==== Winter and spring of 1944 ====
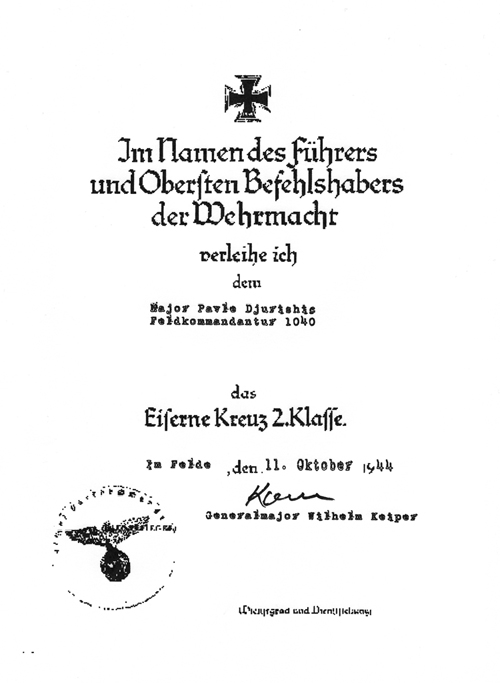
Entitlement document for the award to Đurišić of the Iron Cross – 2nd Class

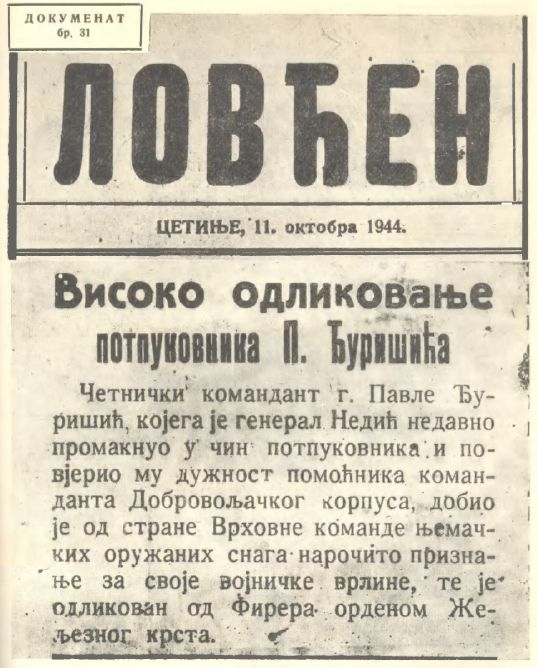
Front page of Lovćen reporting on the award

In February 1944, Nedić sent the 2nd Battalion of the 5th Regiment of the SDK to Montenegro to supplement Đurišić's forces. In the first half of 1944, the Germans in Montenegro and the Sandžak organised offensives against the Partisans, largely relying on forces under the command of Lašić and Đurišić. Because of the weakness of their own forces, the Germans contributed by commanding and supplying the troops involved and providing smaller mobile armoured units with heavy weapons. The Chetnik leaders provided most of the troops. In February and March, the Germans and numerous Chetnik units undertook a series of operations codenamed Bora, Baumblüte and Vorfrühling around Podgorica.

When the Partisan 2nd Proletarian and 5th Krajina Divisions advanced into Serbia in March 1944, Partisan forces in northern Montenegro and the Sandžak were reduced to the 37th Sandžak Division. To exploit this weakness, Đurišić proposed to the Germans that they launch an offensive operation. Operation Frühlingserwachen was planned for the northern parts of Montenegro and the Sandžak; its primary objective was the capture of Kolašin through concentric attacks launched from Pljevlja, Prijepolje and Pešter. This would permit them to link up with forces advancing from Podgorica in the south and to drive a wedge through the middle of the Partisan lines. Operation Frühlingserwachen involved an Axis force of about 5,000 men comprising some of Đurišić's forces, the SS Polizei-Selbstschutz-Regiment Sandschak, the 2nd Battalion of the 5th Regiment of the SDK, and two reinforced German motorised companies. The operation began on 9 April; on 12 April they reached Bijelo Polje. Đurišić's forces seized Berane on 17 April, but the 37th Sandžak Division halted the advancing forces on the line of the Tara River at Mojkovac. On 24 April, after nine days of attacks and counter-attacks, the 37th Sandžak Division, reinforced by the 7th Montenegro Youth Brigade "Budo Tomović" of the 3rd Shock Division, regained the initiative. They retook Bijelo Polje on 30 April, and Berane on 5 May.

This reversal consolidated the poor German–Chetnik position in Montenegro; their forces in the south were completely isolated from those in the north. Chetnik forces and their allies suffered heavy casualties; the 2nd Battalion of the 5th Regiment of the SDK was reduced from 893 men to 350.

==== Summer 1944 ====
In mid-May 1944, Đurišić visited Belgrade and asked Nedić, Neubacher, and Generalfeldmarschall (Field Marshal) Maximilian von Weichs, German Commander-in-Chief Southeast, to urgently send arms and other supplies to his unit, which was authorised to a strength of 5,000 men. Đurišić—with help from the Germans, Nedić, and Ljotić—then established the Montenegrin Volunteer Corps (Serbian: Crnogorski dobrovoljački korpus, CDK), which was formally part of the SDK. The CDK consisted of some of Đurišić's former soldiers who had been released from German captivity, but most were Chetniks who had remained in Montenegro and were gathered under the umbrella term "national forces". By this time, although he still formally owed allegiance to Yugoslavia through Mihailović, he also owed some allegiance to the Germans and to Nedić, who had released, promoted, and supported him.

The German 2nd Panzer Army organised Đurišić's troops into three regiments numbered 6th, 7th, and 8th, following the five regiments of the SDK. The CDK was subordinated to the headquarters of the 2nd Panzer Army. Đurišić was appointed commander; his corps headquarters were in Prijepolje. The 6th Regiment, based in Prijepolje, was commanded by Captain Vuksan Cimbaljević and included Chetniks from the districts of Andrijevica and Berane. The 7th Regiment, headquartered in Pljevlja, was commanded by Captain Radoman Rajlić and consisted of Sandžak Chetniks. The 8th Regiment, based in Podgorica, was commanded by Captain Miloš Pavićević and consisted of Chetniks from Podgorica, Danilovgrad, and Nikšić. Each regiment was planned to consist of two "corps" of 800 men each. The CDK comprised between 7,000 and 8,000 men. Leutnant Heusz, a former German liaison officer for Lukačević, was assigned to watch Đurišić. On 30 May 1944, Heusz sent a detailed briefing to Đurišić instructing him to ensure that joint operations were progressing smoothly. In mid-June, with German consent, Đurišić moved to the Podgorica area with a group of associates to personally direct the formation of the 8th Regiment of the CDK. He reorganised the Chetnik forces under his command, dividing them into two territorial structures (one under a command staff for Montenegro and Boka Kotorska and the other under a command staff for Stari Ras).

Collaboration between Đurišić's forces and the Germans continued into late 1944. On 13 July 1944, Radio Belgrade praised Đurišić "for his services to the Axis cause". The 8th Regiment of the CDK was nearly destroyed in August by the 7th Montenegro Youth Brigade "Budo Tomović" during Operation Rübezahl. The CDK suffered heavy losses in the fighting, and the Germans ordered its re-formation on 21 September 1944. Đurišić and his forces conducted reprisals against the population in Pljevlja, Prijepolje, Priboj, and Nova Varoš. The Chetniks also raided villages to intimidate and eradicate Partisan sympathisers, notably at Bjelopavlići, where 48 communists were executed.

Đurišić remained in Montenegro until the end of Operation Rübezahl in late August 1944, after which he returned to the Sandžak. Following Operation Rübezahl, the presence of Partisan and German forces in northern Montenegro and the Sandžak was reduced and the focus of operations shifted to Serbia. Remaining Partisan units quickly re-established domination over temporarily lost territories and the German 181st Infantry Division ordered its three battalions that remained isolated in the Pljevlja area to break through Partisan-held territory and reunite with the rest of the division at Mateševo. This plan, codenamed Nordsturm, relied on the substantial participation of Đurišić's units. It fitted well with Đurišić's general orientation to move towards the coast, where an Allied landing was expected. Nordsturm began on 31 August. Đurišić and the Germans made progress at first, capturing Kolašin and Berane, but the towns were quickly retaken by the Partisans, who went on the counterattack and proceeded to capture a string of towns in northern and western Montenegro and eastern Herzegovina.

Đurišić maintained contact with Lukačević, who at that time had begun to attack the Germans in Herzegovina with his own forces. Đurišić considered the possibility of joining Lukačević in fighting the Germans in anticipation of an Allied landing. However, because Lukačević was quickly defeated and no Allied landing occurred, Đurišić remained tied to the Germans. German intelligence closely tracked Đurišić's communications and movements, and German commands continued to make use of his forces. The Germans counted Đurišić's Chetniks as part of Army Group E in a survey of available forces dated 16 November 1944. In the survey, German forces in Montenegro at that time were estimated at 47,000 soldiers, including Đurišić's 10,000 Chetniks. On 21 October 1944, the Partisans took the Grahovo garrison after a five-day battle. On 6 November, the Partisans surrounded Cetinje, which was defended by the Germans, remaining Italian fascist Blackshirts, and about 600 Chetniks. On 8 November, the Germans and Chetniks in Cetinje were reinforced with a formation of 800–1,000 Chetniks led by Đurišić, which eventually succeeded in breaking through the Partisan blockade.

On 11 October 1944, at the suggestion of von Weichs, Wilhelm Keiper, the German Plenipotentiary General in Montenegro, awarded Đurišić the Iron Cross (2nd Class) in the name of the Führer and the German High Command for fighting against the Partisans. (Note: There are a substantial number of sources that mention this award.)

=== Withdrawal from Montenegro and death ===
On 14 November, the German XXI Mountain Corps launched an assault from Podgorica towards Nikšić to clear a corridor through which the German forces in Montenegro could withdraw towards the Reich. This task was entrusted to the 363rd Grenadier Regiment of the 181st Infantry Division reinforced with artillery. It was supported by two combined German battle groups and the Italian 86th National Republican Guard (GNR) Battalion—formerly the 86th Blackshirts (CCNN) Battalion. Around 1,200 of Đurišić's Chetniks were deployed on the flanks of the attack. The main Partisan formation facing this assault was the 6th Montenegrin Brigade, which was supported by the artillery group of the 2nd Shock Corps and the 211th (East Lancashire) Battery of the British 111th Field Artillery Regiment, Royal Artillery, which had been landed at Dubrovnik in late October to support the Partisans with their 25-pounder guns as part of the Operation Floydforce. Twelve days of fierce fighting resulted in significant casualties, and the Germans made no progress, losing Boka in the meantime. On 25 November, the Germans decided to abandon this line of attack and attack Kolašin. Chetniks under Đurišić's command continued to fight alongside the Germans. After reaching Kolašin, Đurišić's force separated from the Germans and headed towards Bosnia, marching to the west of the Germans and bypassing Pljevlja. During the breakout and subsequent withdrawal, both the Germans and Chetniks were subjected to frequent attacks by the Allies. According to German documents, Đurišić's forces forcibly recruited men, beat women and looted villages during their withdrawal from Montenegro.

Đurišić's forces proceeded to north-eastern Bosnia to join Mihailović. Đurišić had wanted to withdraw through Albania to Greece but Mihailović told him to prepare for an Allied landing, the return of the king, and the establishment of a national government. After Đurišić joined Mihailović in north-eastern Bosnia, he was critical of Mihailović's leadership and argued strongly for all remaining Chetnik troops to move to Slovenia. Mihailović was not persuaded; Đurišić decided to move to Slovenia independently of Mihailović and arranged for Ljotić's forces, which were already there, to meet him near Bihać in western Bosnia to assist his movement. When he left Mihailović, he was joined by Chetnik ideologue Dragiša Vasić and the detachments commanded by Ostojić and Petar Baćović, and around 10,000 refugees. This force was formed into the Chetnik 8th Montenegrin Army consisting of the 1st, 5th, 8th and 9th (Herzegovina) divisions. During January 1945, Đurišić's Montenegrin Chetniks clashed with Ustaše forces near Sokolac east of Sarajevo, and 50 Chetniks were killed and 100 wounded, after which a truce was agreed between the sides. Đurišić's force than fought the Partisans near Kladanj between Sarajevo and Tuzla, losing another 29 men. In early February, Đurišić attempted to push toward Tuzla, but suffered 150 dead and 200 wounded. These clashes served to erode Đurišić's strength and increase the number of wounded in his group.

To reach Bihać, Đurišić made a safe-conduct agreement with elements of the Armed Forces of the Independent State of Croatia (NDH) and with the Montenegrin separatist Drljević. The details of the agreement are not known, but it is thought he and his troops intended to cross the Sava river into Slavonia where they would join Drljević as the Montenegrin National Army, of which Đurišić was the operational commander. Đurišić apparently tried to outsmart them and sent only his sick and wounded troops across the river, keeping his fit troops south of the river. He began moving his command westwards; harassed by the NDH troops and Partisans, Đurišić's forces reached the Vrbas river north of Banja Luka in late March. Between 30 March and 8 April, the combined Chetnik force was defeated by a strong NDH force armed with German-supplied tanks, in the Battle of Lijevče Field. This was probably the largest combat action between NDH forces and the Chetniks in the previous two years.

After this defeat and the defection of one of his sub-units to Drljević, Đurišić was forced to negotiate directly with the leaders of the NDH forces about the further movement of his Chetniks towards Slovenia. This appears to have been a trap; he was attacked and captured by the NDH on his way to the meeting. Events after his capture are unclear, but Đurišić, Vasić, Ostojić, and Baćović were subsequently killed along with others, including some Serbian Orthodox priests. According to Pajović, the Ustaše executed Đurišić in late April 1945 at the Jasenovac concentration camp. Milan Radanović states that Đurišić was most likely killed on 21 April, and that Đurišić and 31 other Chetnik officers were most likely killed at the main camp site, whereas the rest of the captured Chetniks – around 100 – were executed at the Stara Gradiška sub-camp. The website of the Jasenovac Memorial Site says Đurišić was killed at the camp by the Ustaše in 1945. The location of Đurišić's grave, if any, is unknown.

Both the NDH forces and Drljević had reasons for ensnaring Đurišić. The NDH forces were motivated by Đurišić's terror attacks against the Muslim population in Sandžak and south-eastern Bosnia. Drljević opposed Đurišić's support of a union of Serbia and Montenegro, which was counter to Drljević's separatism.

=== Aftermath ===
Some of Đurišić's troops escaped and travelled west. Some were killed by Partisan forces, who were to the south of their intended withdrawal route west to Slovenia. Đurišić's wife and child, as well as wives of two other officers, were captured by the Partisans after the remnants of Đurišić's column were defeated. The majority, left without a leader, were integrated into Drljević's Montenegrin National Army and withdrew towards the Austrian border. Portions of both groups were later captured in Slovenia by the Partisans. About 1,000 of Đurišić's Chetniks crossed into Austria but were forced to return to Yugoslavia, where some were killed by the Partisans near the Yugoslav–Austrian border. Most were taken to southern Slovenia, where they were killed and their bodies thrown into deep abysses in the Kočevski Rog area.

According to Tomasevich, the killing of the Montenegrin Chetniks by the Partisans at Kočevski Rog was an "act of mass terror and brutal political surgery" similar to that carried out by the Chetniks earlier in the war. It was partly an act of revenge for the mass terror carried out by the Chetniks against the Partisans and pro-Partisan segments of the population and partly to stop the Chetniks from continuing an armed struggle against the communists, perhaps with Western assistance. Less than a quarter of the force that began with Đurišić in Montenegro, and other Chetniks who joined him during the journey north and west, survived. A few weeks later, Drljević, who had fled to Austria, was discovered by followers of Đurišić and killed. Đurišić was one of the most able Yugoslav Chetnik leaders; his fighting skills were respected by his allies and opponents.

== Commemoration controversy ==
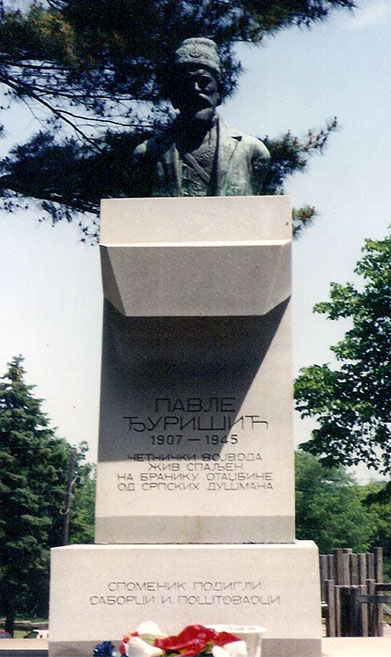
The monument to Đurišić erected in the Serbian cemetery in Libertyville, Illinois

The Serbian diaspora in the United States set up a monument dedicated to Đurišić at the Serbian cemetery in Libertyville, Illinois. The management and players of the football club Red Star Belgrade visited it on 23 May 2010.

In May 2002, plans for a "Montenegrin Ravna Gora" memorial complex to be located near Berane were prepared. The complex was to be dedicated to Đurišić, who spent some of his youth in Berane and established his wartime headquarters there. In June 2003, the Montenegrin Minister of Culture Vesna Kilibarda banned the construction of the monument, saying the Ministry of Culture had not received an application to erect it. The Association of War Veterans of the National Liberation Army (SUBNOR) objected to the construction of the monument, saying Đurišić was a war criminal who was responsible for the deaths of many colleagues of the veterans association and 7,000 Muslims.

The Muslim Association of Montenegro condemned the construction and stated, "this is an attempt to rehabilitate him and it is a great insult to the children of the innocent victims and the Muslim people in Montenegro". On 4 July 2002, the Montenegrin government forbade the unveiling of the monument, stating that it "caused public concern, encouraged division among the citizens of Montenegro, and incited national and religious hatred and intolerance". A press release from the committee in charge of the monument's construction said the actions taken by the government were "absolutely illegal and inappropriate". On 7 July, the police removed the stand that had been prepared for the monument.

In 2011, the Montenegrin Serb political party New Serb Democracy (NOVA) renewed efforts to build a monument; they stated that Đurišić and other royal Yugoslav officers were "leaders of the 13 July uprising" and they "continued their struggle to liberate the country under the leadership of King Peter and the Government of the Kingdom of Yugoslavia".

A street in the Bosnian town of Čajniče, is named after Đurišić.
