= Breakout of Germans and Chetniks from Montenegro =

- Part of World War II
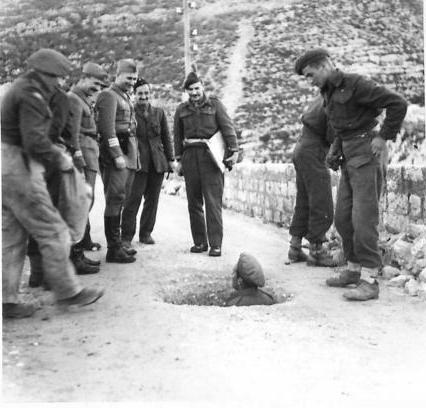
- British and Partisan saboteurs preparing to demolish a bridge near Nikšić in order to hinder the German withdrawal.
Date	October–December 1944
Location	Montenegro and Sandžak
Result	German–Chetnik victory

Belligerents
Yugoslav Partisans	Germany; Chetniks

Commanders and leaders
(Yugoslav Partisans) Radovan Vukanović	(Nazi Germany) Alexander Löhr (Nazi Germany) Werner von Erdmannsdorff (Chetniks) Pavle Đurišić

Units involved
2nd Shock Corps	XXI Mountain Corps; XCI Army Corps; Montenegrin Volunteer Corps

Strength
About 12,000 during November	Unknown

Breakout of Germans and Chetniks from Montenegro was an operation conducted by the German XXI Army Corps, assisted by the Montenegrin Volunteer Corps, to break out from Partisan encirclement in Montenegro at the end of 1944. It formed part of the broader German operation known as the Breakout of Army Group E from Greece.

The German XXI Corps occupied Albania and Montenegro. During September and October 1944, Partisan forces captured Gacko, Berane, Nikšić, Kolašin, Mojkovac, Bijelo Polje, Prijepolje, Pljevlja, Trebinje, Bileća, and Grahovo, thereby cutting off the XXI Corps from elements of the 2nd Panzer Army to the north and east. During the withdrawal of the main body of Army Group E from Skopje to Novi Pazar, the XXI Corps also lost direct contact with those forces, leaving it in complete isolation.

On 14 October, the XXI Corps launched an offensive from Danilovgrad toward Nikšić, with the aim of linking up with elements of the V SS Mountain Corps near Mostar. However, units of the Primorje Operational Group repelled all attempts to break through toward Nikšić, inflicting serious losses on the Germans. In addition, the Primorje Operational Group managed to push back elements of the XXI Corps and the Montenegrin Volunteer Corps on the southern flank and liberated Cetinje and the Bay of Kotor by 22 November. As a result, on 23 November the commander of Army Group E ordered the XXI Corps to abandon the breakout attempt toward Nikšić and Mostar and instead direct its withdrawal from Podgorica via Kolašin toward Prijepolje. To facilitate this breakout, the XCI Army Corps launched an offensive from the direction of Prijepolje to meet the XXI Corps.

After prolonged heavy fighting and serious losses on both sides, the spearheads of the XXI and XCI Corps linked up on 18 December 1944 between Kolašin and Mojkovac, thereby breaking the blockade around the XXI Corps. The 2nd Shock Corps continued to carry out flank attacks against the withdrawing German columns. Pushing back German rear guards, elements of the 2nd Shock Corps liberated Podgorica on 19 December, Kolašin on 29 December, and Bijelo Polje on 3 January 1945. During these battles, a British artillery battalion operated under the tactical command of the 2nd Shock Corps. Allied aircraft closely cooperated in the fighting, attacking German and Montenegrin Volunteer Corps columns on the move and installations along the roads. The XXI German Corps also commanded the Montenegrin Volunteer Corps, which the Germans estimated at around 10,000 men.

== Forces involved ==
Montenegro: On the bridgehead on the western bank of the Lim River, 1,000 Chetniks employed in combat against the communists.

— German report of 3 November 1944

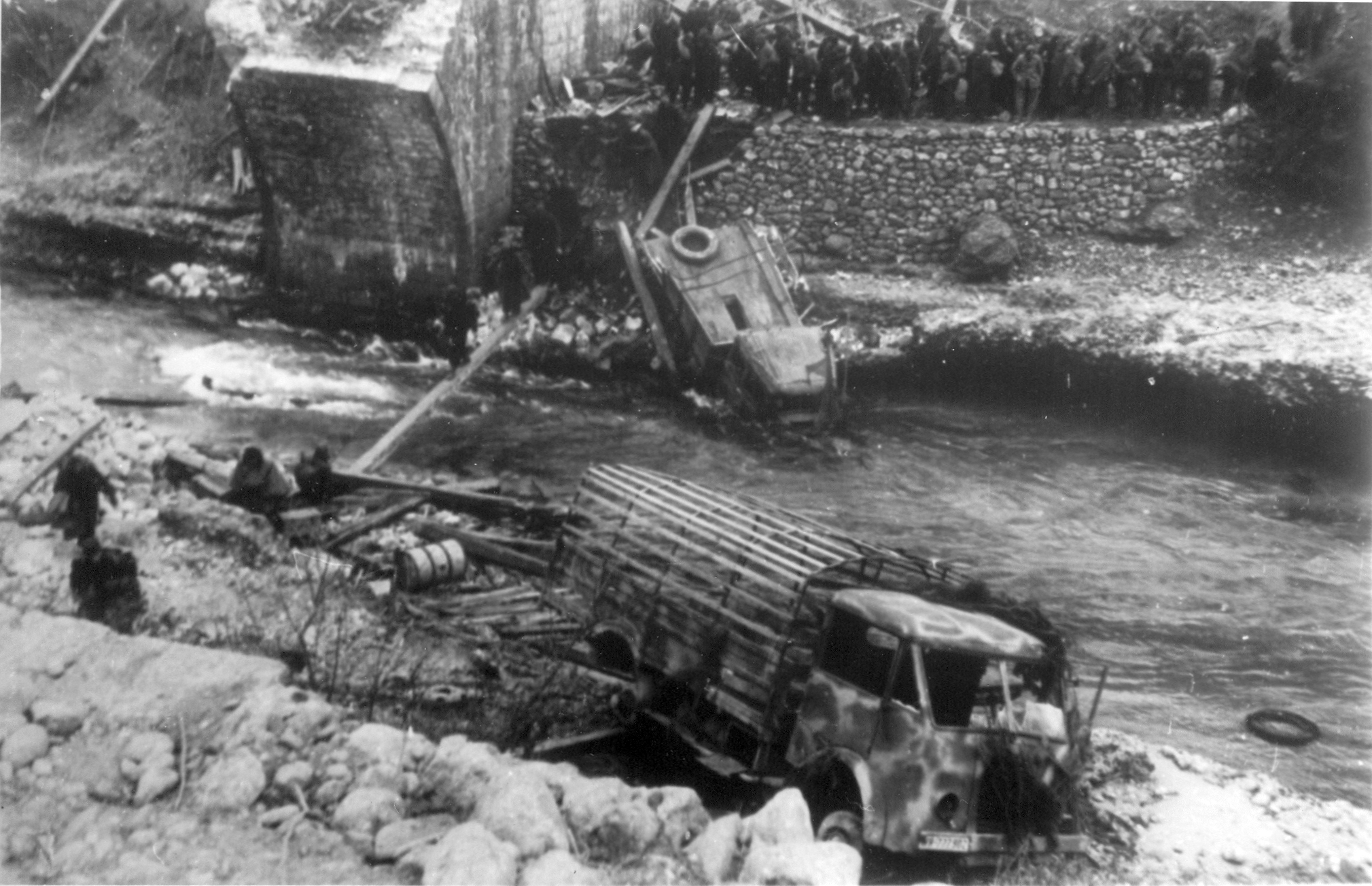
Destroyed enemy trucks in Morača near Podgorica.

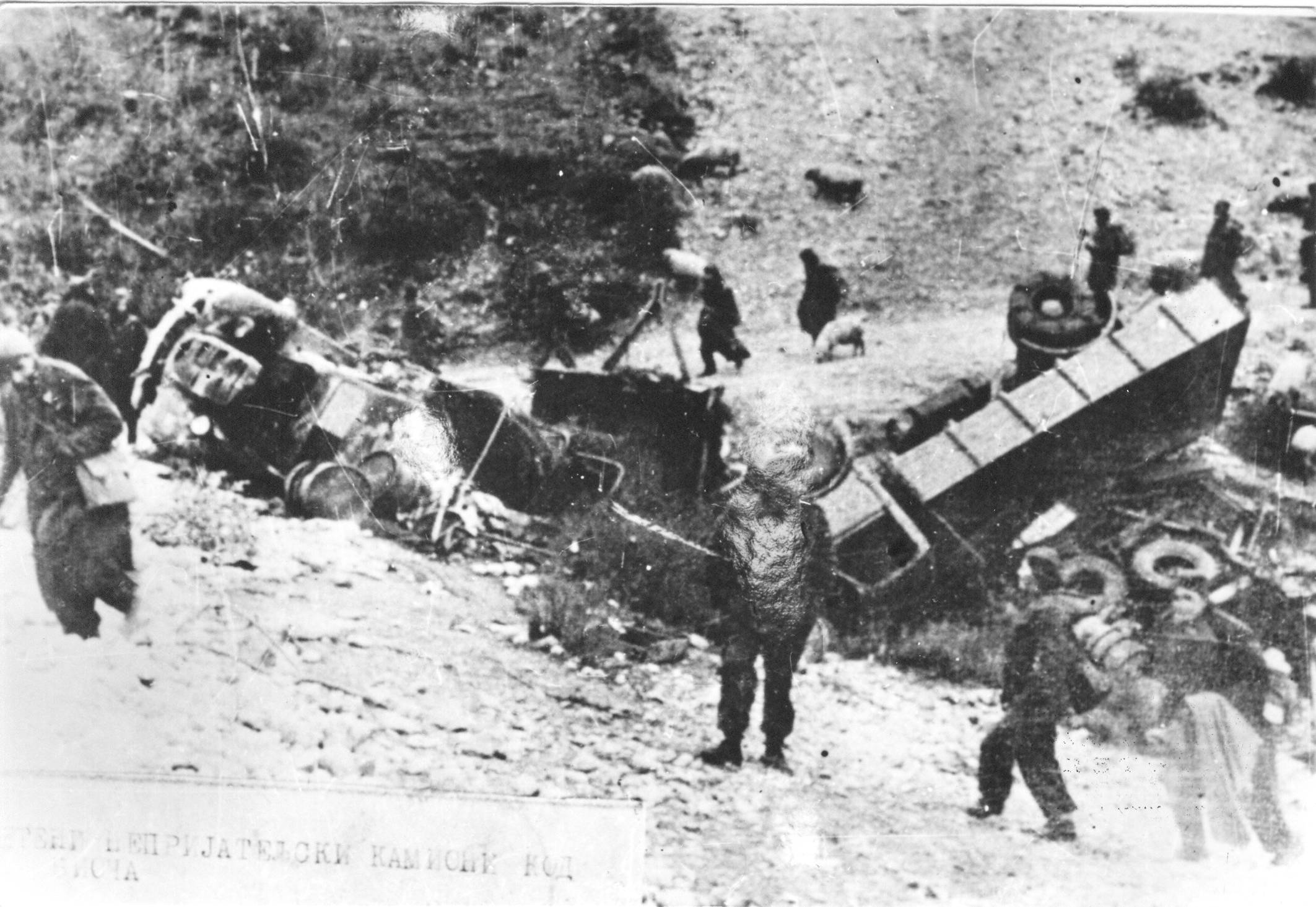
Destroyed mechanized German column during the breakout from encirclement in Montenegro.

=== Wehrmacht ===
• XXI Mountain Corps

  - 181st Division (10,000 troops)
  - 297th Division (11,000 troops)

• Corps troops of the XXI Corps (3,000 troops) • Battle Group Steirer (German: Steirer) (8,000 troops) • Air force units (5,000 troops) • Chetniks of Pavle Đurišić (10,000 troops) • XCI Army Corps

  - 22nd Division (12,000 troops)
  - 41st Division (10,000 troops)

=== Yugoslav Partisans ===
• 2nd Shock Corps

  - 3rd Shock Division
  - 37th Sandžak Division
  - Primorje Operational Group
  - British artillery battalion

In the war memoirs of Hermann Neubacher, the withdrawal of German occupation troops from the Balkans together with Montenegrin Chetniks is mentioned. Neubacher concluded that members of the Yugoslav Army in the Homeland from Montenegro, as well as their family members and many civilians, had thereby tied their fate to the army of the Third Reich:

The withdrawal of German forces from the Balkans took place largely on foot. From Greece, Albania, and Montenegro columns of German soldiers marched northward for days and weeks without rest in exhausting marches. In Montenegro thousands of civilians joined the German column, as did the Chetniks of Pavle Đurišić, who moved in disciplined fashion toward Višegrad and further through Bosnia, which German forces defended for another half year.

— Hermann Neubacher, Sonderauftrag Südost

== Attempted breakout to the west ==
During fighting in mid-September, German–Chetnik forces were defeated and expelled from Nikšić, within the zone of responsibility of the XXI Corps. At the beginning of October, Trebinje was liberated in the zone of responsibility of the V SS Mountain Corps, followed by Bileća and Grahovo on the boundary between the two corps. This isolated the two formations from one another. The XXI Corps carried out unsuccessful local counterattacks.

On 16 October 1944, the command of Army Group E ordered the XXI Corps to open and keep open routes toward Mostar using its own forces. Corps headquarters was informed that this route, codenamed the “Blue Route”, was of decisive importance for the XXI Corps and potentially of great importance for other parts of Army Group E.

The route Skadar–Podgorica–Nikšić must be kept open. The command of the XXI Mountain Corps must bear in mind that during future withdrawal movements the Podgorica–Nikšić–Trebinje–Mostar route, as a marching route, will be of decisive importance for all forces of the XXI Mountain Corps, and additionally for forces withdrawing from southern Greece.

Major General Erich Schmidt-Richberg, Chief of Staff of Army Group E, recorded that the 181st Division was intended to spearhead the westward offensive aimed at opening the “Blue Route” from Shkodër via Podgorica to Mostar.

== Breakout to the north ==
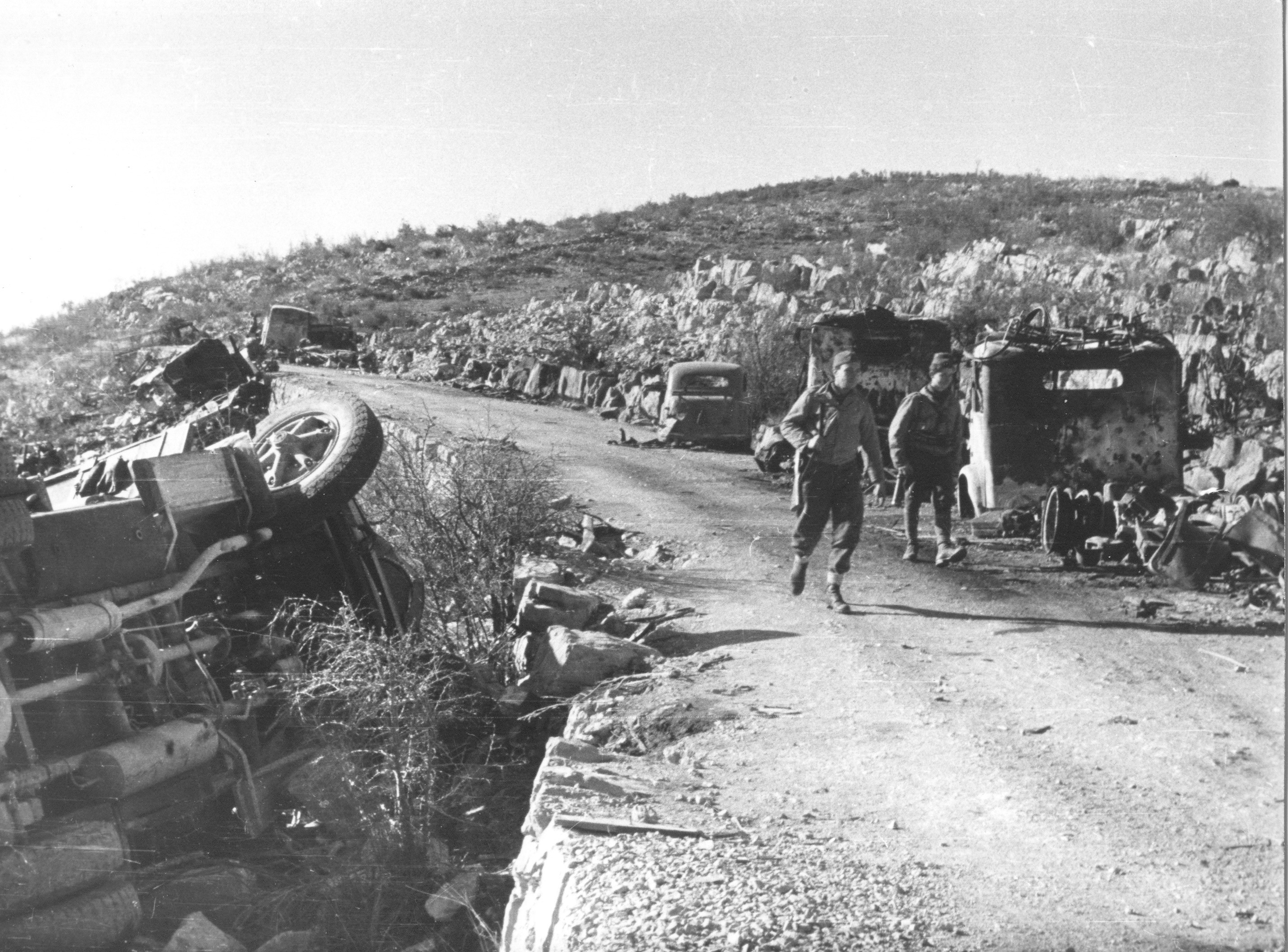
Destroyed German column at the entrance to Podgorica in 1944.

Around middle of December German advance units together with Chetniks managed to reach Sjerogošte near Kolašin:

According to a report of the 22nd Infantry Division, 300 Chetniks arrived in Sjerogošte with the vanguard of the XXI Mountain Corps. According to the Chetnik commander, another 3,000–4,000 Chetniks are accompanying the XXI Mountain Corps.

— War diary of the XCI Army Corps, 19 December 1944

The Chetniks of Pavle Đurišić separated from the German main force in the area of Prijepolje and continued through Sandžak into eastern Bosnia, west of the German forces.

The German breakout through Yugoslav territory was made especially difficult by the fact that Partisans sometimes disguised themselves in German uniforms and called out to guards in the German language.

An intelligence report of the XCI Army Corps of the Wehrmacht gave the following assessment of the Chetniks:

The attitudes of individual nationalist Chetnik groups are unclear and wavering. Nationalist Chetniks captured by Tito’s bands are usually immediately reused within Tito’s ranks against German troops. Caution and restraint, as well as political understanding, are recommended.
