= Grabowo =

Grabowo may refer to the following places:

- Grabowo, Gniezno County in Greater Poland Voivodeship (west-central Poland)
- Grabowo, Wągrowiec County in Greater Poland Voivodeship (west-central Poland)
- Grabowo, German name of Grabowo Królewskie, Września County in Greater Poland Voivodeship (west-central Poland)
- Grabowo, Kuyavian-Pomeranian Voivodeship (north-central Poland)
- Grabowo, Maków County in Masovian Voivodeship (east-central Poland)
- Grabowo, Gmina Olszewo-Borki in Masovian Voivodeship (east-central Poland)
- Grabowo, Gmina Zaręby Kościelne, Ostrów County in Masovian Voivodeship (east-central Poland)
- Grabowo, Przasnysz County in Masovian Voivodeship (east-central Poland)
- Grabowo, Sierpc County in Masovian Voivodeship (east-central Poland)
- Grabowo, Gmina Goworowo in Masovian Voivodeship (east-central Poland)
- Grabowo, Augustów County in Podlaskie Voivodeship (north-east Poland)
- Grabowo, Kolno County in Podlaskie Voivodeship (north-east Poland)
- Grabowo, Łomża County in Podlaskie Voivodeship (north-east Poland)
- Grabowo, Sokółka County in Podlaskie Voivodeship (north-east Poland)
- Grabowo, Gdańsk County in Pomeranian Voivodeship (north Poland)
- Grabowo, Kwidzyn County in Pomeranian Voivodeship (north Poland)
- Grabowo, Gołdap County in Warmian-Masurian Voivodeship (north Poland)
- Grabowo, Iława County in Warmian-Masurian Voivodeship (north Poland)
- Grabowo, Mrągowo County in Warmian-Masurian Voivodeship (north Poland)
- Grabowo, Nidzica County in Warmian-Masurian Voivodeship (north Poland)
- Grabowo, Gryfino County in West Pomeranian Voivodeship (north-west Poland)
- Grabowo, Kamień County in West Pomeranian Voivodeship (north-west Poland)
- Grabowo, Kołobrzeg County in West Pomeranian Voivodeship (north-west Poland)
- Grabowo, Łobez County in West Pomeranian Voivodeship (north-west Poland)
- Grabowo, Sławno County in West Pomeranian Voivodeship (north-west Poland)
- Grabowo, Stargard County in West Pomeranian Voivodeship (north-west Poland)
- Grabowo, Szczecinek County in West Pomeranian Voivodeship (north-west Poland)
- Grabowo, Szczecin

== See also ==
- The same name may be transliterated differently from different native languages:
  - Grabovo (disambiguation)
  - Grahovo (disambiguation)
  - Graovo (disambiguation)
  - Hrabove (disambiguation)
