= Battle of Serbia =

1944 battle in Yugoslavia during WWII

- Part of World War II in Yugoslavia
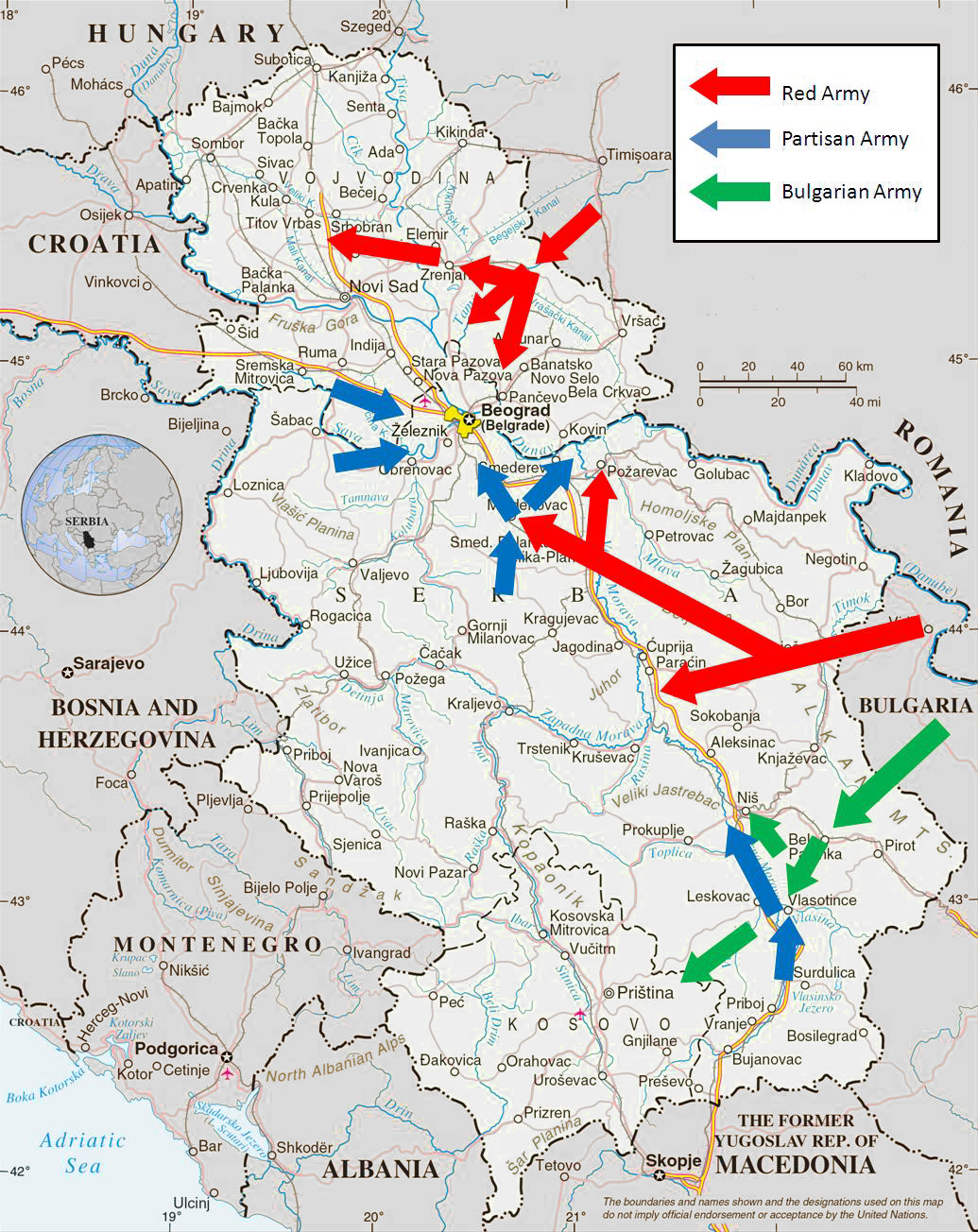
- Belgrade offensive
Date	15 September – 21 October 1944
Location	Serbia
Result	Allied–Yugoslav victory: Fall of Nedić’s Serbia

Belligerents
Yugoslav Partisans; Soviet Union; Bulgaria; United Kingdom; United States	Germany; Government of National Salvation; Chetniks

Commanders and leaders
(Yugoslav Partisans) Josip Broz Tito (Soviet Union) Fyodor Tolbukhin (United Kingdom) Henry Wilson	(Nazi Germany) Maximilian Weichs (Nazi Germany) Hans Felber (Chetniks) Dragoljub Mihailović (Chetniks) Miroslav Trifunović (Government of National Salvation) Milan Nedić

The Battle of Serbia was a joint Allied effort with the aim of establishing a strong foothold and mastering the central communication area of the German forces on the Balkans, i.e. Army Group F, during World War II. Actions on the ground were carried out by the NOVJ, and the Allies provided combat assistance, supplies and air support.

The territory of Serbia was, however, of key importance for all actors. All four specific actors: the German Southeast Command, Allied Mediterranean Command, NOVJ and JVuO, they had specific interests in Serbia, and based on them they formulated their strategies. Coalitions were formed based on matching interests.

From the end of 1943. The Allies changed their attitude towards Mihailović's forces, and the priority of their policy in Yugoslavia became helping to strengthen the NOVJ forces in Serbia The Supreme Headquarters of the NOVJ made plans to support the strengthening of partisan forces in Serbia by the penetration of stronger forces from Bosnia and Montenegro. The German command, as well as Mihailović, were determined to prevent it.

Considering the Drina as a natural obstacle suitable for defense, the NOVJ plans consisted in concentrating forces on the left side of the Lim, where units collected and prepared for penetration deep into Serbia. Germany Southeast Command with this in mind decided to defend Serbia with active actions - by preventing the movement of units of the NOVJ through Bosnia across the west, as well as a series of large and ambitious operations in Sandžak and eastern Bosnia calculated to break the NOVJ concentrations and disable them for offensive operations. The forces of the JVuO, for their part, participated with great enthusiasm in these operations, as well as in those organized by the German commander of Serbia against local partisans.

The peak of this collaboration occurred in August 1944, which was also a turning point in which the most intense and massive actions took place. The efforts of the NOVJ ended in success after long, exhausting battles. During the first days of August, a group of NOVJ divisions (2,5) managed to break through from Montenegro Gore and forces Ibar. On August 21, the First Proletarian Division penetrated into western Serbia, soon followed by the Sixth Lička, and in early September the Twelfth Corps. These forces liberated many towns (Gornji Milanovac on September 12, Valjevo on September 18, Arandjelovac on September 20) and established a base for the upcoming attack on Belgrade. In the first half of September, the German defense of Serbia from the west, already compromised by major penetrations of the NOVJ, experienced a breakdown due to the outbreak of the Red Army threat from the east.

At that moment, Allies and NOVJ had a decisive advantage. Operation Ratweek and the fighting in Macedonia prevented the Germans from trying to effectively reinforce the defenses of Serbia, and the battle for Serbia was definitely decided during October, Belgrade operation - the invasion of the well-equipped forces of the Red Army, to which the NOVJ represented a valuable partner, both by covering the territory and communications in depth, as well and as frontline infantry.

The battle for Serbia was thus resolved. Further fighting in the southwestern part was not aimed at regaining control over Serbia, but the breakthrough of German Army Group E from Greece.

During the Battle of Serbia 1944, the partisans, with the support of the allies, led the fight for liberation from the occupiers and the coming to power, while the Chetnik units, left without the support of the allies, entered into full collaboration at all levels in an attempt to prevent the arrival communist competitors for power.

== Background ==
Tell anyone who tells you that there are still people from Nedić, Dražino, and Ljotić that it is a lie, because from today there are only Serbs, on the one hand, and communists, on the other. Novo vreme' from March 24, 1944.

After the collapse of the uprising at the end of 1941, Serbia was largely a pacified territory. Except for a couple of short-lived episodes, there were no more operational troops on its territory until September 1944. To maintain order and peace, the Germans used a police regiment, various Quisling guards, territorial battalions, and "a bug. Occup. disposition to fight, barely matched the combat value of the German Landeschichen units". November 4, 1944 The focus of war moved west of the Drina and south of the Lim.

When asked by Field Marshal von Weichs where the communists imprisoned in the concentration camp were, the Higher SS and police leader Hermann Behrends replied that they had all been killed. He then drew attention to the fact that he had managed to insert sufficiently strong Security Services groups into the Chetnik ranks, which should remain with the Chetniks in the future. To that, the Commander-in-Chief remarked that this alone was a sufficient reason why the leadership of the Chetniks should be entrusted exclusively to the Senior SS and Police Leader. Notes from the consultation of the German occupation leadership on the Chetnik issue in Serbia, October 8, 1944.

=== Strategic importance of Serbia ===
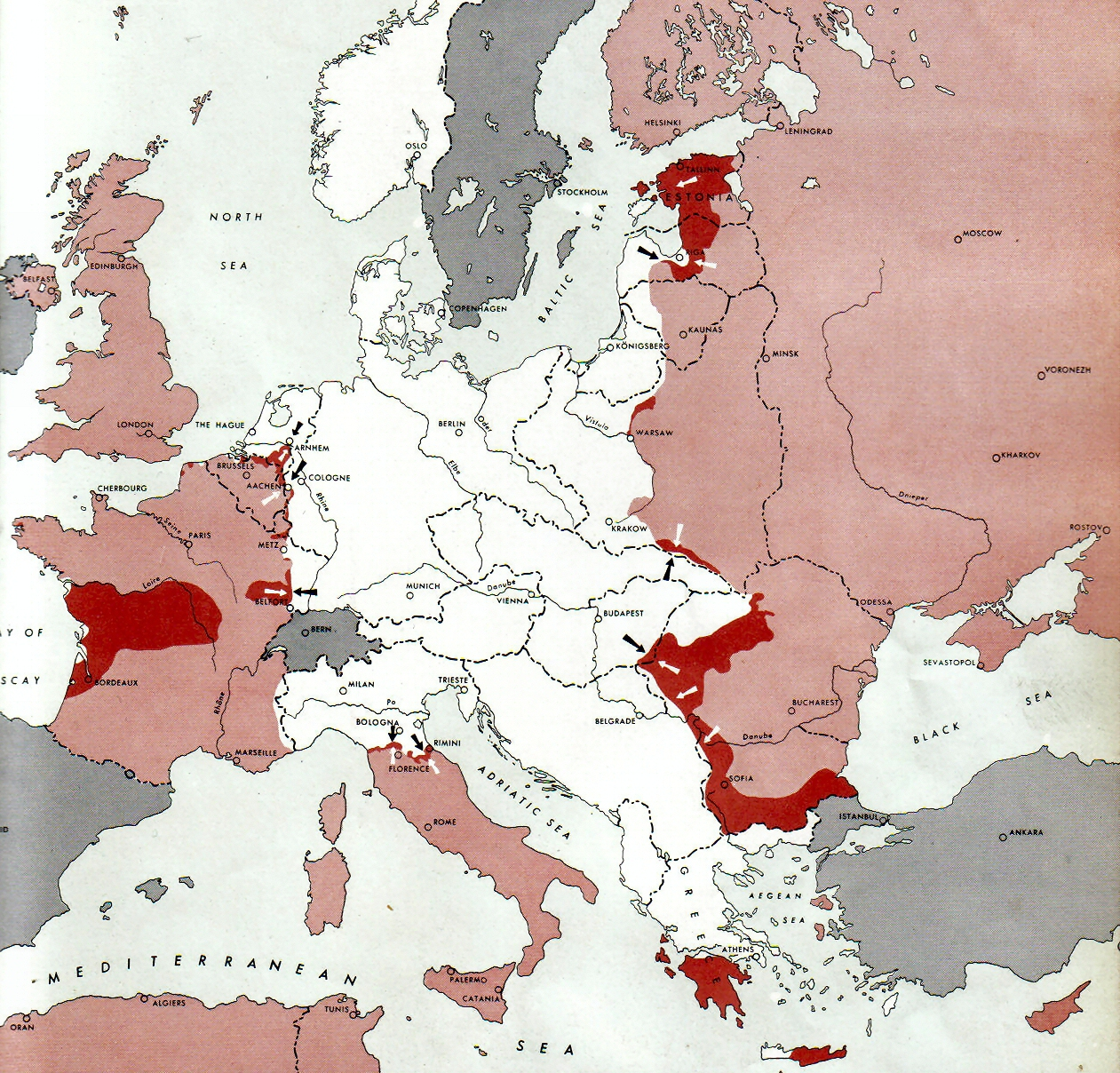
Eastern Front on the borders of Serbia, October 1, 1944

Of course, Serbia is primarily important to its inhabitants as the homeland and the place where they live. Two military-political movements, Titov National Liberation Movement and Mihailović Ravnogorsk Movement, had conflicting concepts and conflicting intentions regarding the character of society and the organization of the state. Both movements were determined to dominate Serbia. A special reason was that both movements declared themselves as Yugoslav, and Serbia represented a key factor without which Yugoslavia is not possible.

Serbia was important to foreign belligerents for several reasons:

1. It had certain resources important for waging war - primarily agricultural and mining.

2. Serbia is in a particularly important strategic position. Considering the development of the war in the Mediterranean basin, the Germans allocated two large operational formations to the Balkans: the Second Panzer Army in Yugoslavia and the Army Group E in Greece. Considering all possible operational scenarios, good, broadband communications between them were of key importance, both for supply and for eventual deployment of forces. However, due to the configuration of the terrain and underdeveloped infrastructure, there was only one suitable communication channel: the Moravian-Vardar route. As a result, the Balkan, although geographically a wide peninsula, represented a communication strait.

This dependence on one communication was a problem for the Germans on the one hand, and an attractive motive for action for the Allies on the other. From the Allied point of view, given its length, the communication was difficult to defend, and very significant results could be achieved on it with a relatively modest force.

Thus, from the point of view of the Allied Mediterranean Command, Serbia was a platform from which to attack German vital communications.

3. There was also a political motive. Hitler had views on the political future of Europe that are incompatible with the views of the other subjects, but the visions of the Allies differed to a considerable extent. Therefore, establishing some future political influence was not an insignificant motive for either side. So in the second half of 1943. profiled the intentions and interests of the main contenders for Serbia:

1. NOVJ had plans to conquer strategic positions in Serbia, to ensure political and military dominance
2. JVuO intended to prevent this at all costs
3. The Allied Mediterranean Command planned to use the NOVJ to create problems for the Germans on vital communications
4. Germany's Southeast Command intended to firmly hold and defend Serbia and maintain communications security.
5. The Red Army did not exert influence or intentions towards Serbia until September 1944. Then Serbia became a good operational opportunity for it, in case of successful blocking of German forces by the NOVJ and the western Allies.

=== Evolution of the Allies attitude ===
In these fateful and great days for Yugoslavia, when the victorious armies of the Soviet Union stand on our border on one side, and the American and British armies on the other, when the day of our freedom is in full dawn, I call on all Serbs, Croats and Slovenes to unite and join the People's Liberation Army under Marshal Tito. (...) by our people's army, which is unanimously recognized, supported and helped by our great allies, Great Britain, the Soviet Union and the United States of America. All those, who rely on the enemy against the interests of their own people and its future, and who would not respond to this call, will not succeed in getting rid of the traitor mark, neither in front of the people nor in front of history. With this message of mine to you, I strongly condemn the abuse of the name of the king and the authority of the crown, which tried to justify cooperation with the enemy and cause discord among the fighting people in the most difficult hours of its history, thus benefiting only the enemy. Invitation of King Peter II to join the People's Liberation Army of Yugoslavia Invitation of King Peter II to join the People's Liberation Army of Yugoslavia (September 12, 1944)

Great Britain is for reasons of ideological closeness and loyalty to the Yugoslav king and government in November 1941. promised full support to Mihailović, albeit on the condition that he reach an agreement with "other elements of the resistance". However, the actual situation on the ground was quite well known. As early as July 1942, Glenconner wrote to the Southern Department of the Foreign Office:

»As we know, we would actually have to attribute all activity in Yugoslavia to the partisans. However, when it comes to the public use (of that data), I don't see why it would be harmful to credit some of it to Mihailović.«

Many authors explain the genesis of the attitudes of the Allies towards the events in Yugoslavia primarily with political motives. They ended up playing a significant role. However, in this period, from the summer of 1943. until the summer of 1944, there was still a dominant concept that the basic goal was to defeat Germany militarily, that everything possible should be done to inflict as large a state as possible on it, while everything else was of secondary importance. The political theory of the genesis of the allied attitude towards Yugoslavia is also based on an incorrect assumption about the negligibly small importance of events in Yugoslavia to the war as a whole.

Contrary to this conception, it was the army, not politics, that exerted pressure and took steps in this evolution.

Contrary to David Martin's conspiracy theory, the Allied Commander in the Mediterranean depended very little on information gathered through SOE. He had several sources of quality and comprehensive information:

- Allied experts succeeded in decoding the German codes of the Ultra series, so that General Wilson had a report on German radio traffic on his desk every day. Basil Davidson of SOE stated that in early 1943, apparently by decision of some higher command, those reports began to reach SOE:

I think that we started receiving intercepts in early January 1943 and that they probably started arriving on my desk already at the beginning of January. It was very clear that these were intercepted telegrams of the "Sicherheitsdienst" in Yugoslavia, so that they were extremely valuable information... They were telegrams with, for example, content like this: "Partisans who were previously in X or Y are in movement towards Z. We are sending Chetniks against them." Another factor of historical significance is that these notifications played a very large role in the Prime Minister's (Churchill's) decision, which occurred when he arrived in Cairo in February 1943, to initiate changes in our policy.

- The Axis press, especially in Italy, wrote a lot about operations in Yugoslavia, openly portraying extensive cooperation with the Chetniks.
- Allied officers in Yugoslavia, especially Bill Hudson, succeeded in the second half of 1942. to describe to some extent the situation on the ground on which they were moving through radio messages.

Due to a significantly greater number of sources, the commander of the Mediterranean, General Wilson, who was then in Cairo, had a clearer overall picture of the situation and factors in Yugoslavia than Colonel Bailey, who was in Mihailović headquarters in Lipovo near Kolašina.

==== "Ibarski telegram" ====
After the defeat at Neretva, with Mihailović's forces allied with the Italians while the British Army was fighting the Italians in Africa, from the perspective of the Mediterranean Command, the situation in Yugoslavia looked like this:

Partisan forces fight and provide effective resistance to the Axis. However, it seems that the partisans lost their foothold in Serbia after the collapse of the uprising. There are still some Mihailović's forces there who could perhaps be induced to undertake something useful for the Allied cause. Based on this view of the situation, the Commander of the Mediterranean in May 1943, before the SOE mission even reached Tito's Supreme Headquarters, sent Mihailović the famous so-called "Ibar telegram", which was sent to the liaison officer, Colonel Bailey, to deliver it to Mihailović, which he did 29 May 1943:

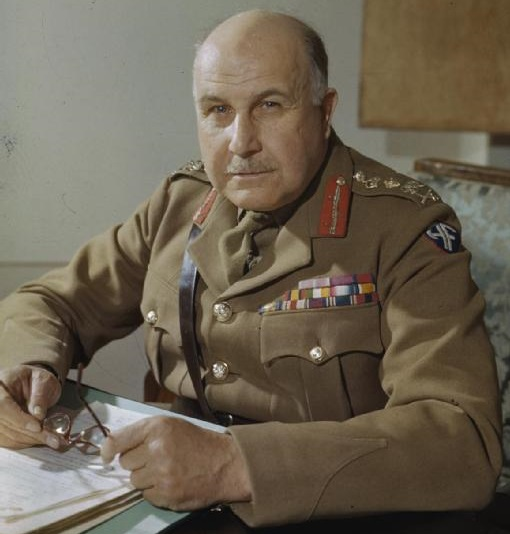
Henry Maitland Wilson, Supreme Allied Commander in the Mediterranean.

The war in the Mediterranean has reached a stage when an Allied offensive can be considered imminent. It is absolutely necessary that General Mihailović now begins to fulfill the obligations he accepted earlier and that he cooperates fully at this moment... Mihailović does not represent a fighting force of any significance west of Kopaonik. Its units in Montenegro, Herzegovina and Bosnia have already been destroyed or are closely cooperating with the Axis. It is also difficult to say that his units exist in Croatia, Slovenia and Slavonia... The Partisans represent a good and efficient fighting force in all regions, where only the Quislings represent General Mihailović.

That's why it was decided: you will inform Mihailovic that the British Central Command of the Middle East demands that he, as an ally, stop all cooperation with the Axis and go east, to Serbia. There he should establish full authority and personal influence to continue his attacks on enemy communications. You will inform Mihailovic to immediately go to Kopaonik with all his loyal officers and men; if necessary, let it be broken through by force, with the armed forces. The British High Command will in future consider the area under its command and influence to be limited to the west by the combat elements that already exist on the right bank of the Ibar River and southward to Skopje. To this territory the British High Command will send a great deal of aid by air.

Please explain all this to Mihailović, convey these decisions to him as categorically as possible and try to get his quick and unequivocal consent for their implementation. You and the entire British mission will accompany Mihailović to Kopaonik and strive to make his cooperation sincere and successful... We ask London to agree with King Peter and Jovanovic to send instructions to Mihailović, informing him that the closest coordination of action with the allied forces is necessary in view of to future operations in southern Europe.

This request, originating from the relevant military command, inspired by wartime operational interests, was withdrawn at the request of the British government. There was a period of adjustment, weighing and negotiation.

==== December telegram ====
Although in the meantime Mihailović led an action against German and NDH forces that "lasted six weeks". The commander of the Mediterranean assessed that these were secondary and short-term activities, while avoiding to take any action on communications important for the Allies and for the Germans. Therefore, 9 December 1943 sent Mihailović a telegram demanding the execution of specified attacks on communication, which begins with the words:

'The freedom with which the Germans use the railways from Greece to Belgrade for the transport and maintenance of troops is intolerable. December 1943 to Draž Mihailović on the request of the Command of British troops in the Middle East that the Chetniks carry out two acts of sabotage against the Germans],

This telegram is considered a kind of ultimatum to Mihailović. The aforementioned attacks on communications were never carried out, and in mid-December General Wilson instructed all allied officers in Mihailović's forces that they were free to leave the Chetniks and link up with the nearest Partisan forces. However, this action to evacuate Allied officers for security reasons took place in stages until the end of May, 1944.

Prime Minister Great Britain Winston Churchill made a formal decision to withdraw support for Mihailović 17 February 1944. After that, allied aid was directed at strengthening the forces of the Yugoslav Partisans

In the meantime, the Allied High Command began to focus more and more attention on Serbia.

The strategic importance of Serbia was obvious. It was located on the Belgrade-Thessaloniki railway line, a communication of vital importance to the enemy. Its importance would be increased if the Allies landed somewhere in the Balkans, which at that time was still a possible possibility. Until then, we considered Serbia to be primarily a Chetnik domain. The material that we delivered to them there earlier was thrown out to Mihailović. But the results, according to the Middle East Command, were disappointing. In particular, there was very little or no interruption of traffic on the Belgrade-Thessalonica line... In the Lower House Mr. Churchill explained the government's action. "The reason - he said - why we stopped supplying Mihailovic with weapons and did not give him support was simple. He did not fight against the enemy and, moreover, some of his subordinates made agreements with the enemy." This is how a relationship that was based on a misunderstanding from the beginning ended. With the help of our propaganda, we made Mihailović something in our imagination that he never seriously presented. Now we have rejected it, because it did not meet our own expectations.

Since it was decided to reject the Chetniks, the task of our policy was to help strengthen the partisans in Serbia as soon as possible... Now the Serbian partisans had a high degree of priority for obtaining materials...

After a series of complex battles, the envisioned major combined ground and air force operation against vital communications was carried out in the first week of September 1944. in cooperation with the NOVJ and the Allied Air Force. It is known by its code name "Operation Ratweek" Ratweek, and was of great importance to the further development of the war in Europe.

==== Support for partisans ====
The change in our attitude also had a significant psychological effect. All the prestige that the Chetniks had enjoyed until then due to allied assistance was transferred to the Partisans. The effect was increased by the news that Tito had reached an agreement with King Peter, and by the king's proclamation calling on his subjects to support the partisans, which dispelled General Mihailović's claim that he was fighting for the monarchy.

As it often happens, all these events, one after the other, acted like an avalanche. Allied support and material aid attracted an even greater number of volunteers; better equipped and more numerous, the partisans were able to increase the scope of their activities; their successes on the battlefield, on the other hand, brought larger stocks of seized weapons and increased their prestige all the more; thus, in a few months, the movement strengthened considerably.

Finally, the civilian population also understood that the more active politics of the partisans was not frivolous, as it once seemed to them. Then it suddenly became clear to them that this very policy secured Tito's allied support, which Mihailović, no matter how well-intentioned, eventually lost due to his caution and inactivity.Fitzroy MacLean

Every day, more and more former supporters left the Chetniks, and more and more volunteers joined the ranks of the Partisans. In the following days, long lines of men and boys made their way to Partisan headquarters to take rifles and ammunition; partly deserters, partly prisoners, partly conscripts, partly volunteers, some in their old uniforms and with traditional Chetnik beards, others in ordinary work clothes.

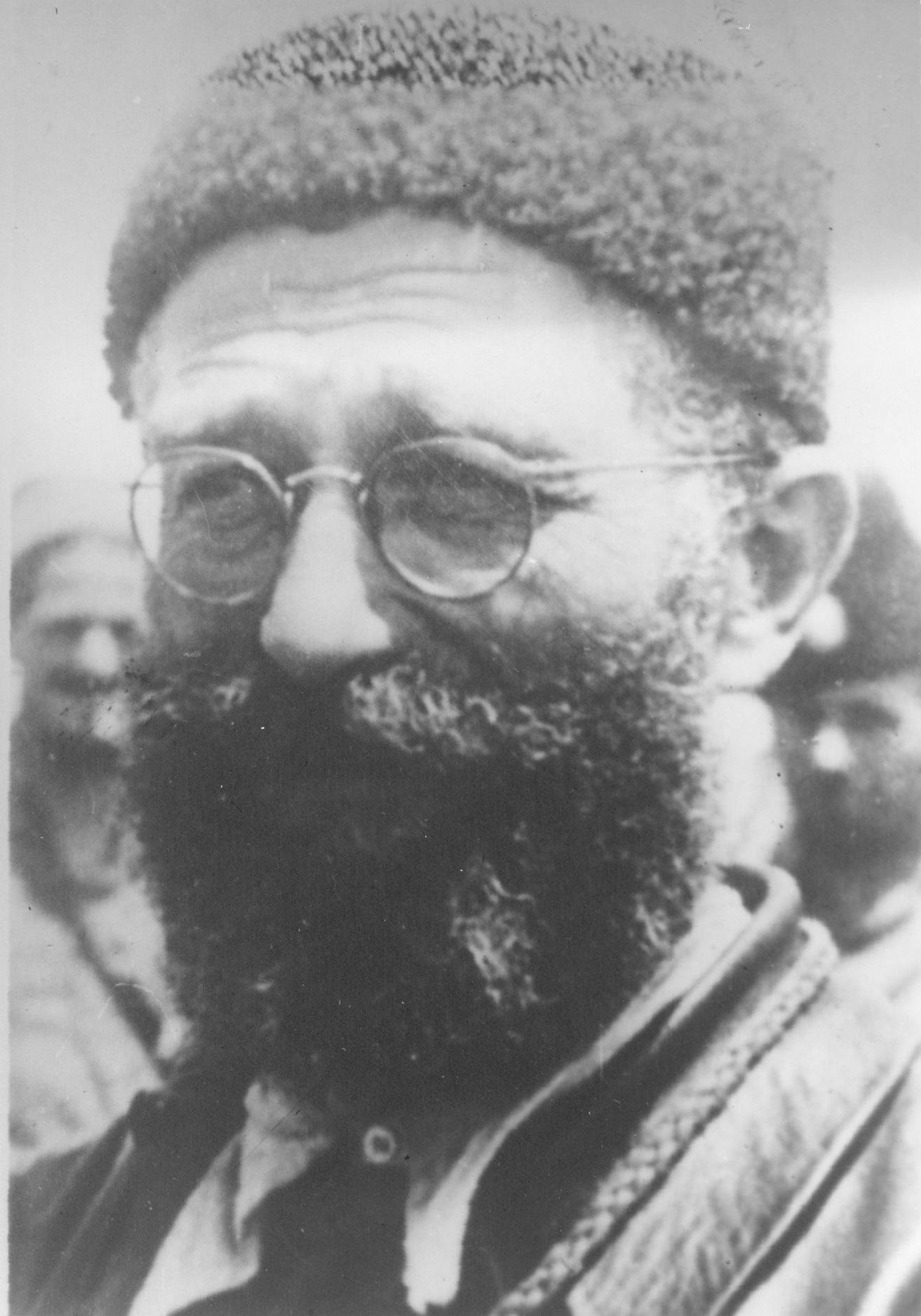
Dragoljub Mihailović, Chetnik leader.

"Serbia:[...] due to constant incidents caused by the Chetniks, it was ordered to stop aid to those D.M.-Chetniks participating in the fight against the communists."

"Serbia: bandit activity at the local level. Chetnik raids continue. On the other hand, the increasing willingness of larger D.M.-units to continue the fight against communism in Montenegro and Eastern Serbia under German command. June 1, 1944 (June 2, 1944)

"D.M.'s behavior so far has the following characteristics:

a. The active fight against the communists in Serbia, Montenegro and Croatia, with the fact that this fight is always risky for the forces of D.M. due to the numerical and especially material and technical superiority of the communists.
b. Failure to fulfill the special tasks set by the Allies.
c. Local, sometimes very active cooperation with German troops, intelligence and other occupation authorities.
d. Full readiness to carry out tactical instructions issued by German liaison officers.

e. Constantly repeating the request for ammunition and weapons to fight the communists, as a reward for proven loyalty."

Due to strong partisan pressure, more Chetnik units, including those from Eastern Serbia, expressed their readiness for further struggle against communism in cooperation with the Wehrmacht.

"Serbia: Chetnik attitude still different." Serbian Chetniks fight together with the Wehrmacht against the communists. Even D.M. requested German insurance for the planned transfer of his headquarters from northwestern Serbia to the area southwest of Belgrade. However, this plan did not materialize. In contrast, the Chetniks in Eastern Bosnia, Herzegovina and southern Montenegro are hostile. They are moving towards the coast, in order to establish contact with them in the event of an Allied landing and receive Allied protection from the Reds. It is known from a reliable source that D.M. expressly condemned their anti-German attitude."

"The Ockoljić Chetnik group from Eastern Serbia provided the rear for Müller's corps during the fight against the Russians in the Danube-Zaječar bend area.

"According to information from a reliable source, Chetnik troops in southwestern Serbia and Sandzak are still fighting the Communists, under the express orders of D.M."

"Uncertainty among the Chetnik units regarding taking a final stance towards the development of events in Yugoslavia is partially confirmed by Keserović's unsuccessful attempt to establish cooperation with the Russians, as well as Damjanović's friendly gestures towards the 1st Mountain Division. In addition, according to the latest reports, Baćević asked for talks in Vienna. Judging by the latest reports, we should expect close cooperation on the line England-Subašić-Russia-Tito. In that case, the Chetniks would be left all alone, unless they decided to radically change their current course.

"After his intentions to get closer to the Russians failed, and after it turned out that the desired landing of the Allies in the Adriatic and establishing contact with them was nothing, D.M. feels alone in the struggle for bare survival. Accordingly, new attempts are being made to approach our own occupation troops.”

"Contrary to Tito's gangs, which the Russians firmly lead, D.M. the movement finds itself in a gap between the fear of the red enemy and the hope for the hitherto absent Anglo-American help. Their will to fight communism is undiminished; partly they lead it with German help, and partly they hope for English help, especially in the Albanian-Montenegrin area and in Macedonia. ... Although rejected from all sides, the Chetniks' course is obvious, which, on the one hand, strives for the destruction of their main enemy Tito at any cost, and on the other, still hopes for political and practical help from the Anglo-Americans."

In October 1944, the Chetniks in Dragačevo attacked the Germans on the Čačak-Zablaće road. They handed over several hundred prisoners to the Russians.

=== Available forces ===
• NOVJ strength estimated at 25,000

• German, Bulgarian and Quisling units: 67,921

In the summer of 1944, the Chetniks numbered around 9,000 armed fighters.

SOE in a memorandum to the Chiefs of Staff of October, 1943. estimated the forces of the NOVJ at around 180,000 armed fighters, and Mihailović's at around 20,000. German Southeast Command estimated Mihailović's forces in December, 1943. to 31 thousand people (Slovenia 500, northern Dalmatia and Lika 2,000, western Bosnia 1,500, eastern Bosnia 3,000, Herzegovina 3,000, Montenegro 5,000, southwestern Serbia 2,500, northwestern Serbia 3,000, central Serbia 3,000, Kopaonik 1,500, southeastern Serbia 3–4,000 and northeastern Serbia about 2,000). In July 1944, the Germans estimated Mihailović's forces in Serbia at 25,000 (northwest Serbia 2,500; southwest Serbia 3,000; southeast Serbia 1,500; northeastern Serbia 5,500 and central Serbia 12,500). Some believed that Mihailovićev was larger than the number of fighters in the units indicated, so von Weichs was convinced that, with German help and equipment, was able to organize an army of 50,000 men.

The forces of the NOVJ were significantly more numerous, and, starting with the capitulation of Italy, significantly better armed. However, their organization in Serbia itself was rebuilt more slowly. In November, 1943. in Serbia they had only about 1,700 people with the tendency of further rapid growth. The Supreme Headquarters of the NOVJ was determined to take advantage of this tendency, and for that purpose to insert strong and experienced troops from the west into Serbia. The Germans carried out actions against the transfer of NOVJ forces with great determination and significant success (they were greatly helped by insight into the radio traffic of the NOVJ headquarters, whose codes they broke). However, in the last days of July, one operational group (three divisions, about 8,000 people), and at the end of August another one (two divisions, about 7,000 people) - both of high combat value - managed to break the German obstacles, overcome the operational pressure Other Armored Armies and penetrate deep into Serbia. All these formations practically doubled in number in the first weeks, but the combat value did not increase at the same rate.

How dramatic the situation was from the perspective of the German occupier is best evidenced by the report dated November 4, 1944, jointly signed by Field Marshal Maximilian von Weichs and General Hans Felber. The report is a recapitulation of events from the previous period (August–November 1944). Two of the highest commanders of the German Wehrmacht in occupied Yugoslavia even state that there was "the formation of a new Eastern Front":

Despite the mobilization of alert units and the concentration of insignificant reserves, and recklessly leaving wider parts of the country exposed, the penetration of Tito's forces across the Ibar Valley towards the southeast of Serbia could not be prevented in fierce battles.

Army Group "F" threw the 1st Brigade into battle against Tito's forces, prepared in Montenegro. Eluding his pressure, other Tito units crossed the southwestern border of Serbia at the beginning of August. At first, the intention of the Military Administrative Commander of Serbia was to eliminate the main danger in Southeastern Serbia. For this purpose, on August 28, the "Auleb" Group Command was entrusted with the command of all units that were engaged in southeastern Serbia. The attack was supposed to start after bringing the 1st Brd. giant from Montenegro.

The situation demanded the immediate mobilization of all forces available in that area, as well as the bringing of other German forces from the rest of the southeastern region and their engagement to form a new Eastern front.

For their part, the Germans in Serbia had only symbolic police and territorial forces of second-rate combat value, as well as some 5,000 fighters of the SDK, and the same number of RZK. Serbian State Guard and border guard had about 13,000 men in their composition. The bulk of this formation was reformed in September into a unit called the Serbian Strike Corps (6,800 strong) and placed under Mihailović's command. In addition, there were about 25,000 Bulgarian reservists in Serbia by the end of August.

Front units were deployed in the surrounding areas: 21. mountain corps (about 60,000 people) in Montenegro and northern Albania, V SS Mountain Corps (60,000) in eastern Bosnia, and southern Dalmatia, 15. mountain corps (about 60,000) in the area west of the Bosna river and south of the Sava, and the 69th reserve corps (30,000-40,000) north of the Sava. In addition to them, Southeast Command formed a mobile operational group, which in August numbered around 50,000 men, was under the tactical command of the headquarters of the 5th SS Corps, and which carried out operations against the NOVJ in Sandžak, Montenegro and eastern Bosnia.

However, during September, this operational group had to be moved in parts to eastern Serbia, in order to form a front against the advancing Red Army. Despite the evacuation of Greece, until November, 1944. Command Southeast succeeded, from its over 600,000 men, against the Red Army and the NOVJ in Serbia (including Banat) only 80,000 to 90,000 people. And those smaller movements of forces from the territory of the Second Panzer Army were paid for by the loss of many positions and cities.

== Chronology of fights ==
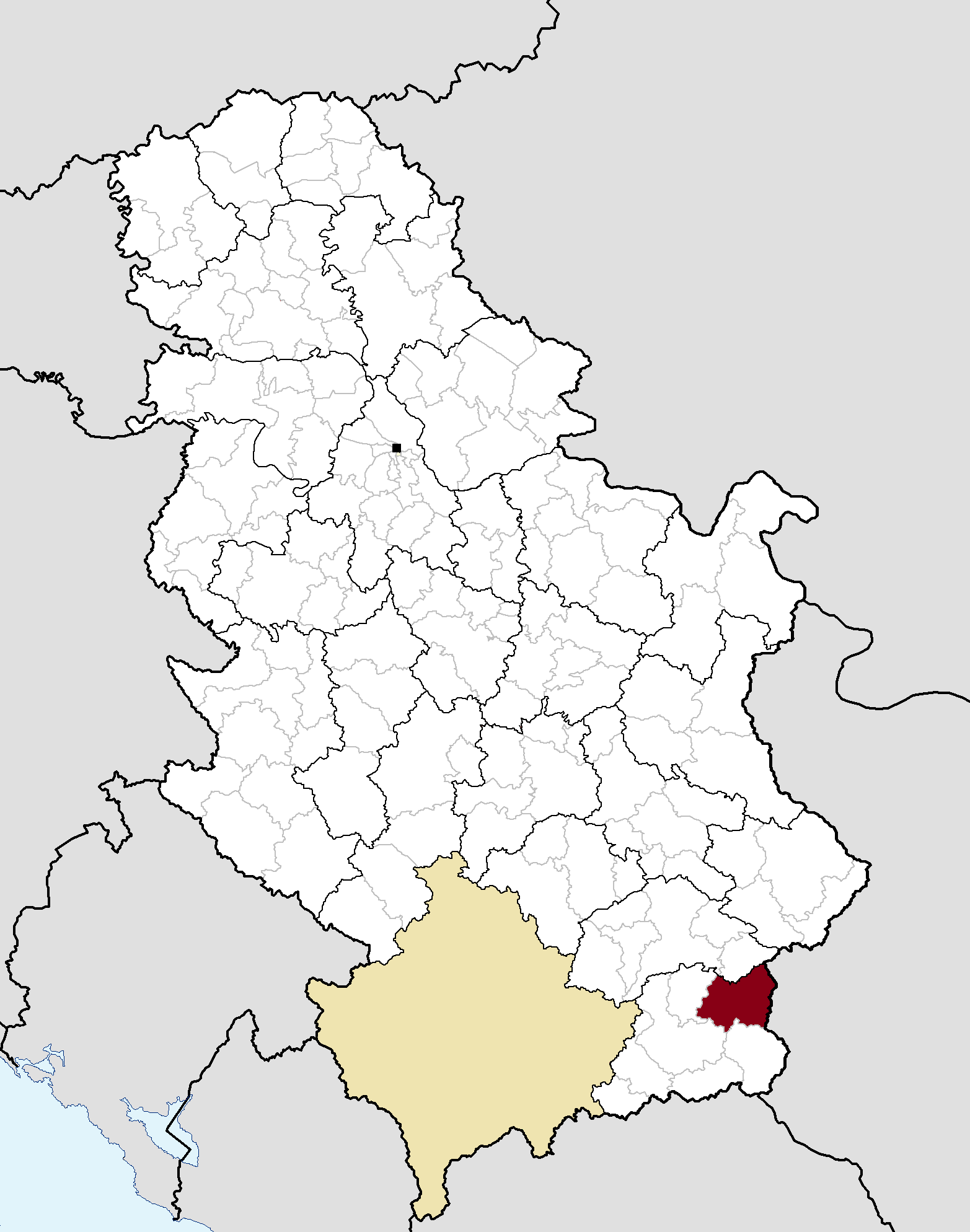
Location of Ivanjica in Serbia

Already in January 1944, the Partisans began major operations for the liberation of cities in Serbia. Battle of Ivanjica was fought in January, 1944. between the Yugoslav partisans on the one hand, and the joint Axis forces (Chetniks, Germans, Bulgarians, Ljotićevci, Nedićevci) on the other.

Partisans initially managed to liberate Ivanjica, but were repulsed by the intervention of much stronger Axis forces. After that, Ivanjica was reoccupied and remained under the control of the Germans until the autumn of that year, when it was finally liberated.

=== Partisan breakthrough into Serbia in the spring of 1944 ===
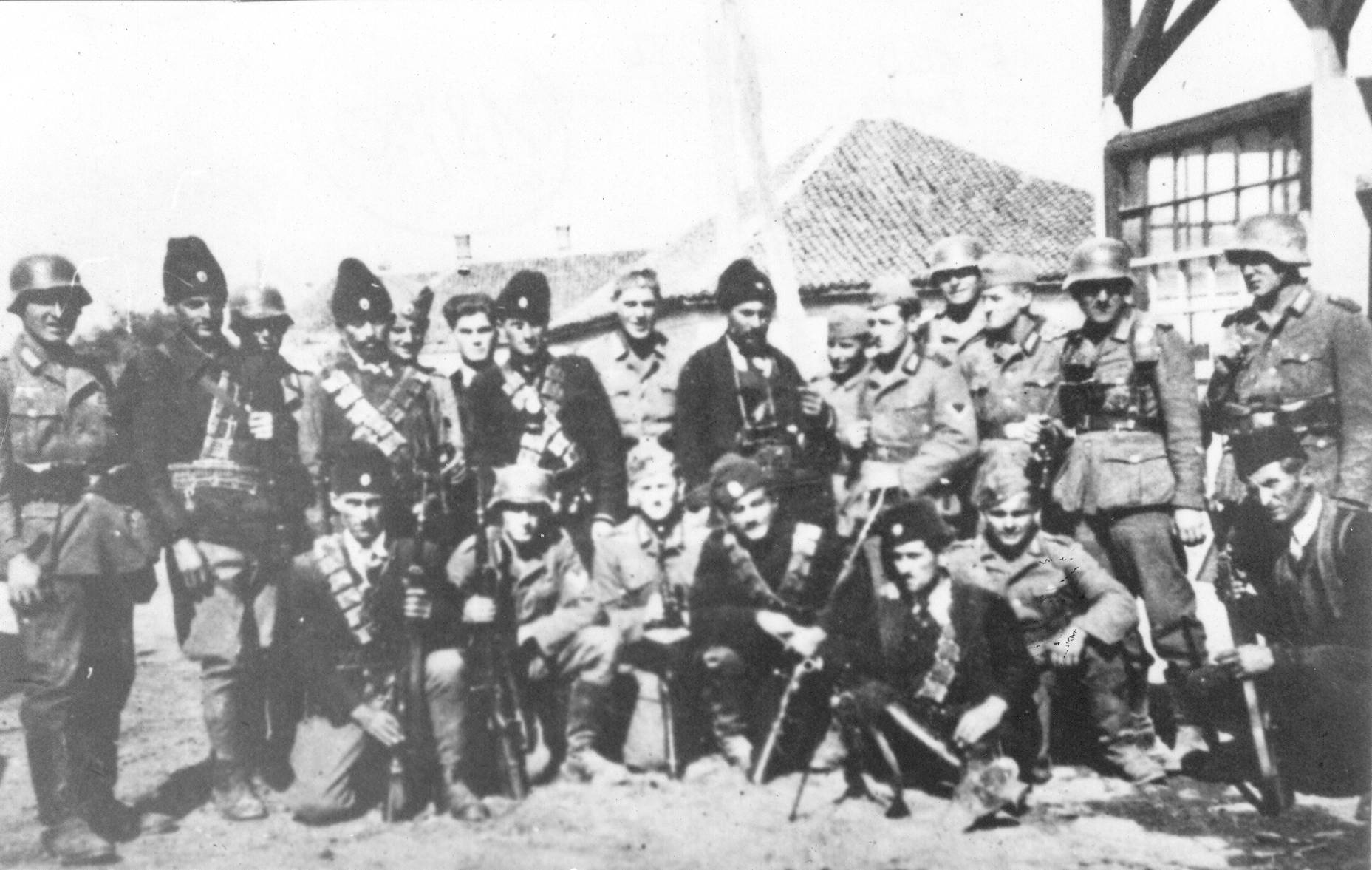
A group of German soldiers and Chetniks of Draža Mihailović during the breakthrough into Serbia of the 2nd Proletarian and 5th Krajina Divisions of the NOVJ

At the behest of D.M., Raković specified again: 1. Certain (written) guarantees that there are not even the slightest intentions to plan a general uprising or to carry out sabotage actions.
2. Readiness to fight against communists outside of Serbia, along with ammunition deliveries.
Raković further announced that the main headquarters of the DM were afraid of the advance of the Russians on the Eastern front.

The command of Army Group F considered this threat serious and made a plan of its own countermeasures. It took measures to take the initiative, curtail and prevent the NOVJ operation. For the tactical command of operations in Serbia, she assigned the Military-administrative commander of the Southeast, General Felber. At the same time, Command Ag F took care of the coordination of General Felber's actions with 2. armored army, i.e. with 5. SS Corps in eastern Bosnia and 21. corps in Sandžak.

Military Commander of the Southeast General Felber, although he did not have front-line forces, formed a combined detachment from rear German, Bulgarian and RZK and SDK forces. The main mass of his forces consisted of the JVuO forces, which took a large part in this operation on their own initiative. With these combined forces he managed to prevent the NOVJ forces from forcing the Ibar, and managed to keep them under constant pressure, constantly attacking, disrupting, harassing and weakening them.

For its part, 5. SS Corps effectively prevented attempts to force the Drina by 17. division NOVJ, and 21. Corps in the starting area managed to threaten some important areas for the NOVJ, both with significant involvement of Chetniks.

Thus, after 66 days of grueling fighting, the NOVJ division were forced to retreat to their initial positions, failing to establish the planned connections and stronghold zones, thus the NOVJ operation ended in failure.

“Serbia: the remnants of the 2nd and 5th divisions united on Zlatar Mountain (south of Nova Varoša). Thus, after two months, the attempt of the Morača Group, which lost three quarters of its strength, to carry out Tito's order to create a communist base in southeastern Serbia ended. Against small German and in some places considerable Chetnik and volunteer losses, the enemy lost 2,736 dead, 108 captured and 64 defected [...]."

=== Penetration of partisans into western Serbia ===
In addition to the agreement of 15 August, it is announced that the following weapons can be made available for issue to Chetnik units, in the best case: 7,000 rifles 6.5 mm (Italian) with 100 bullets each 50 tesh. machine guns 8 mm (ital.) with 13,000 bullets each 42 light launchers 4.5 mm (ital.) with 250 bullets each. It is warned that the entire supply of Italian infantry ammunition in the domain of the Commander of the Southeast has been exhausted and that new shipments can only be expected from October 1944 and that in a limited volume. Notification of the Southeast Command on the approval of weapons and ammunition to the Chetniks (August 16, 1944)

On September 9, 1944, the Partisan First Proletarian Corps defeated the main Chetniks in the Battle on Jelova Gora. from that moment Draža Mihailović and his units ceased to be a political and military factor in Serbia.

The first corps had a lot of trouble to liberate Valjevo. The Germans, who retreated, and for whom this was a key position, decided to keep it at all costs and the garrison fortified itself to the last man in the last stronghold around the barracks turned into a fortress by a very well planned and executed fortification system. In the battle that ensued, the partisans suffered heavy losses and only defeated the enemy when two allied "Bowfighters" with rockets, called from Italy, delivered the final blow to the besieged garrison, crashing down and firing rockets from close range at the barracks building.

The rapid fall of Valjevo surprised many residents who cooperated with the occupier and did not have time to organize their escape. This included: supporters of Nedić and Ljotić, as well as some Chetniks. On the facade of one house there were still slogans: "Long live Ljotić! Death to the Bolshevik scum!", which the owner, despite frantic efforts in the last hour, was unable to erase.

In the liberated Valjevo, the concentration of people was carried out and then they headed towards Arandjelovac, 60 km south of Belgrade.

In September 1944, the Kolubar Corps of the JVUO and the Germans together defended Ub from the units of the People's Liberation Army.

=== Allied bombing ===
The operation was carried out with great military success, which prevented the German command from maneuvering its forces from Greece on neighboring European battlefields. The Germans were prevented from marching maneuvers - their forces on the move were separated into many groups, tied to positions and forced to break through for a long time under combat. This isolation of large German forces enabled the rapid liberation of Serbia, the successful execution of the Belgrade operations and the forced advance of the Red Army into southern Hungary, which was of great importance for ending the war in Europe.

Due to the massive use of heavy bombers, the operation caused significant civilian casualties.

Allied air forces repeatedly bombed German strongholds in Belgrade. The infrastructure in Belgrade was successively bombed in April, May, June, July and the last time in September 1944. The heaviest civilian casualties were recorded during the April bombing, which coincided with the Orthodox Easter. The lead unit in this action was the US 15th Airborne Division, based at Fođa on south of Italy. Only in the strikes on April 16 and 17, 600 large four-engine bombers took part, dropping bombs from 3000 to 5000 meters. On April 17, the concentration camp Staro Sajmište was also hit, when 60 inmates died and around 150 were wounded. During the allied bombings of Belgrade (eleven in total, from April to September 1944), almost 1,200 citizens died, and over 5,000 were injured. battles in Belgrade 1941–44.

A particularly large number of civilian victims were during the bombing of Leskovac on September 6, 1944.

=== Niš operation ===
The Niš operation was carried out by the NOVJ and the Bulgarian Army with the assistance of the Soviet Air Force against the German forces in the Niš - Leskovac - Vlasotince. The operation started 8. October, 1944. and it lasted 7 days. The attacking forces achieved significant numerical superiority and occupied favorable positions before the start of the operation, and during the action they forced the German units to retreat, surrounded them, defeated them and inflicted a heavy defeat on them. The Južne Morava valley and all places east of it were liberated.

During the operation, weaknesses in the cooperation between the Yugoslav and Bulgarian units became apparent, which hindered the achievement of even greater success. The unacceptable behavior of the Bulgarian units during and outside the battle led to tension and crisis in the relations between the two sides.

=== Belgrade operation ===
The operation lasted from the 12 October to the 20 October 1944. year and was part of the extensive operational plan of the Third Ukrainian Front of the Red Army and the NOVJ, building on without interruption the operations in eastern Serbia and continuing with the pursuit of the enemy through Srem. The combined units of the NOVJ and the Red Army inflicted a heavy defeat on the German Army Group "Serbia" in this operation, they liberated Belgrade, the capital of Yugoslavia and a large part of Serbia

The liberation of Belgrade ended the 1,287-day long German occupation of the capital of Yugoslavia. Belgrade (along with Paris in part) was the only capital city in Europe in whose liberation the regular national army, The National Liberation Army of Yugoslavia participated equally with the armies of the major anti-fascist powers. After liberation, Belgrade became a military, political and administrative center and seat of the government of the new, SFRJ.

== Later development ==
Draža Mihailović will continue the fight against communism. Chetnik units could serve as vanguards and security for communications during the transfer of German troops from Serbia. Following the defeat in Serbia, the remaining German forces attempted to break through to the west toward the borders of the Third Reich. These units consisted of remnants from five or six divisions, including the First Alpine Division and the Prince Eugen division, which had previously operated in the Bosnian mountains.

With the liberation of Belgrade, the guerrilla phase of the national liberation struggle ended. In a few weeks, Serbia, Macedonia, Montenegro, Herzegovina, Dalmatia and large areas of Bosnia and Croatia were liberated. The Germans were now in full retreat and their strategy was focused solely on preserving the communications they had lost. Accordingly, they gathered the bulk of their forces to maintain the main line of communication on the line Sarajevo—Brod—Zagreb with the bare minimum of territory needed for defense.

Northeast of Brod, protecting the other flank of the retreat that was seriously threatened by the Red Army, the Germans offered strong resistance in Srem. The Srem front was stabilized here, where the Germans desperately resisted the combined forces of the Russians, Yugoslavs and Bulgarians. Meanwhile, in the north of Yugoslavia, in Croatia and Slovenia, the Germans were preparing defense lines to which they thought they would finally retreat. In a period of two or three months, guerrilla warfare turned into a frontal war, which was completely new for the partisans.

== Sources ==
- Milan Radanović (2015). Kazna i zločin: Snage kolaboracije u Srbiji (PDF). Beograd: Rosa Luxemburg Stiftung. ISBN 978-88-383-1882-5. Archived from the original (PDF) on 2016-08-26.
- Bataković, Dušan T., ed. (2005). Histoire du peuple serbe (in French). Lausanne: L’Age d’Homme. ISBN 9782825119587.
- Cohen, Philip J. (1996). Serbia's Secret War: Propaganda and the Deceit of History. Texas A&M University Press. ISBN 0-89096-760-1.
- Pavličević, Dragutin (2007). Povijest Hrvatske. Naklada Pavičić. ISBN 978-953-6308-71-2.
- Krivosheyev, Grigoriy Fedotovich (1997). Soviet Casualties and Combat Losses in the Twentieth Century. Greenhill Books. ISBN 9781853672804.
- Christopher Chant (18 October 2013). The Encyclopedia of Codenames of World War II. (Routledge Revivals; 2013). ISBN 978-1134647873.
- Maclean, Fitzroy (1991). Eastern Approaches. London: Penguin Books. ISBN 978-0-141-04284-8.
- McConville, Michael (2007). A Small War in the Balkans. Uckfield: The Naval & Military Press Ltd. ISBN 978-1-847347-13-8.
- Williams, Heather (2003). Parachutes, Patriots, and Partisans. London: C. Hurst & Co. (Publishers) Ltd. ISBN 1-85065-592-8.
