= Hrabove =

Hrabove or Hrabové can mean:

== Slovakia ==
- Hrabové (Slovakia), a populated place in Slovakia

== Ukraine ==
- Hrabove, Donetsk Oblast, a village in Donetsk Oblast, Ukraine
- Hrabove, Odesa Oblast, a village in Odesa Oblast, Ukraine
- Hrabove, Shatsk Raion, a village in Shatsk Raion, Volyn Oblast, Ukraine
- Hrabove, Stara Vyzhivka Raion, a village in Stara Vyzhivka Raion, Volyn Oblast, Ukraine

== See also ==
- The same name may be transliterated differently from different native languages:
  - Hrabove (disambiguation)
  - Grabovo (disambiguation)
  - Grabowo (disambiguation)
- Hrabovec (disambiguation)
