= Grabovo =

Grabovo may refer to:

- Grabovo, Croatia, a settlement near Vukovar, Croatia
- Grabovo, Russia, several rural localities in Russia
- Grabovo, Beočin, a village in Vojvodina, Serbia
- Grabovo, Ražanj, a village in Nišava District, Serbia
- In Ukraine:
  - Grabovo, Zakarpattia Oblast
  - Grabovo, Lviv Oblast
  - Russian-language versions of places called "Hrabove" in Ukrainian

== See also ==
- The same name may be transliterated differently from different native languages:
  - Hrabove (disambiguation)
  - Graovo (disambiguation)
  - Grahovo (disambiguation)
  - Grabowo (disambiguation)
