= General Fischer =

General Fischer may refer to:

- Adolf Fischer (officer) (1893–1947), German Wehrmacht major general
- Gotthard Fischer (1891–1969), German Wehrmacht lieutenant general
- Hermann Fischer (general) (1894–1968), German Wehrmacht lieutenant general
- Jean Chrétien Fischer (1713–1762), German-born French Army general
- Wolfgang Fischer (1888–1943), German Wehrmacht general

== See also ==
- General Fisher (disambiguation)
