= Graovac =

Graovac (pronounced [ɡrâoʋats]) is a Serbo-Croatian surname, derived from the toponym Graovo. Notable people with the surname include:

- Ante Graovac (1945–2012), Croatian scientist
- Daniel Graovac (born 1993), Bosnian footballer
- Kristina Graovac (born 1991), Serbian handballer
- Tyler Graovac (born 1993), Canadian ice hockey player
- Mark Graovac (born 1957), Australian engineer

== See also ==
- Grahovac (disambiguation)
