= Montenegrin Volunteer Corps =

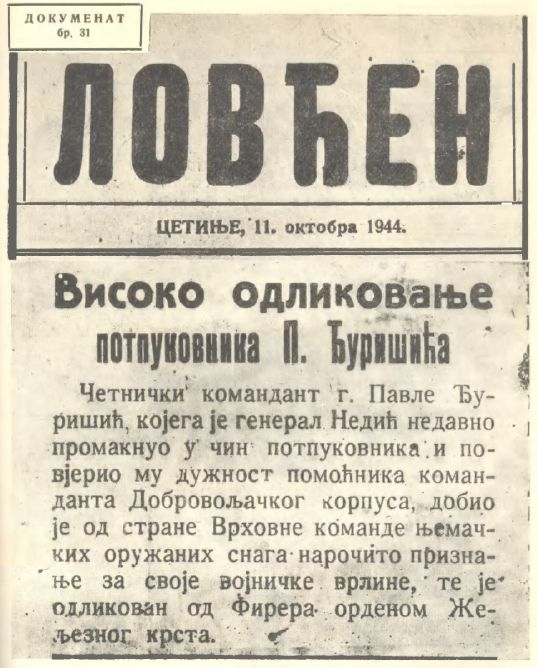
- The newspaper Lovćen stating that Pavle Đurišić got awarded the Iron Cross after forming Montenegrin Volunteer Corps.
- Active: 1944–45
- Disbanded: 15 May 1945
- Allegiance: Nazi Germany: Government of National Salvation
- Branch: German Army
- Size: 10,000
- Part of: Serbian Volunteer Corps (officially); Wehrmacht
- Engagements: Operation Draufgänger (Andrijevica); Operation Rübezahl; Breakout of Germans and Chetniks from Montenegro; Battle of Poljana

Commanders
- Notable commanders: Pavle Đurišić

The Montenegrin Volunteer Corps (Serbian: Crnogorski dobrovoljački korpus, Црногорски добровољачки корпус; German: Montenegrinisches Freiwilligenkorps) was a collaborationist military formation that was created in the spring of 1944 under Chetnik leader Pavle Đurišić with assistance from the Germans, Milan Nedić, and Dimitrije Ljotić. It was formally a part of the Serbian Volunteer Corps. The Corps consisted of some of Đurišić's former troopers that were released from German captivity, but the majority were Chetniks that remained in Montenegro under the name of "national forces". Đurišić developed the force in Montenegro and Sandžak and it consisted of between 7,000 and 8,000 men.

In April 1945, negotiations were launched between Đurišić, Sekula Drljević, and the Ustaša for safe passage to German-occupied Slovenia and a safe-conduct agreement was formed. The details of the agreement are not known, but it appears Đurišić and his troops were meant to cross the Sava River into Slavonia where they would be aligned with Drljević as the "Montenegrin National Army" with Đurišić retaining operational command. Đurišić, however, along with some other Chetnik commanders, including Zaharije Ostojić and Petar Baćović, some political leaders, and a number of Orthodox priests were killed in apparent trap set by Drljević and the Ustaša. A small part of Đurišić's troops escaped and went west; however a larger part of them, left without a leader, were integrated into Drljević's forces and were dispatched towards the Austrian border. A portion of both groups were later caught by the Yugoslav Partisans in Slovenia. The majority of those who successfully crossed into Austria were returned by the Partisans to Slovenia, where, alongside other collaborationist forces, they met their doom in May. Of the entire force that began with Đurišić in Montenegro and other Chetniks that joined him for the trek less than a fourth survived.
