= Operation Draufgänger =

1944 German military operation

- Part of World War II in Yugoslavia
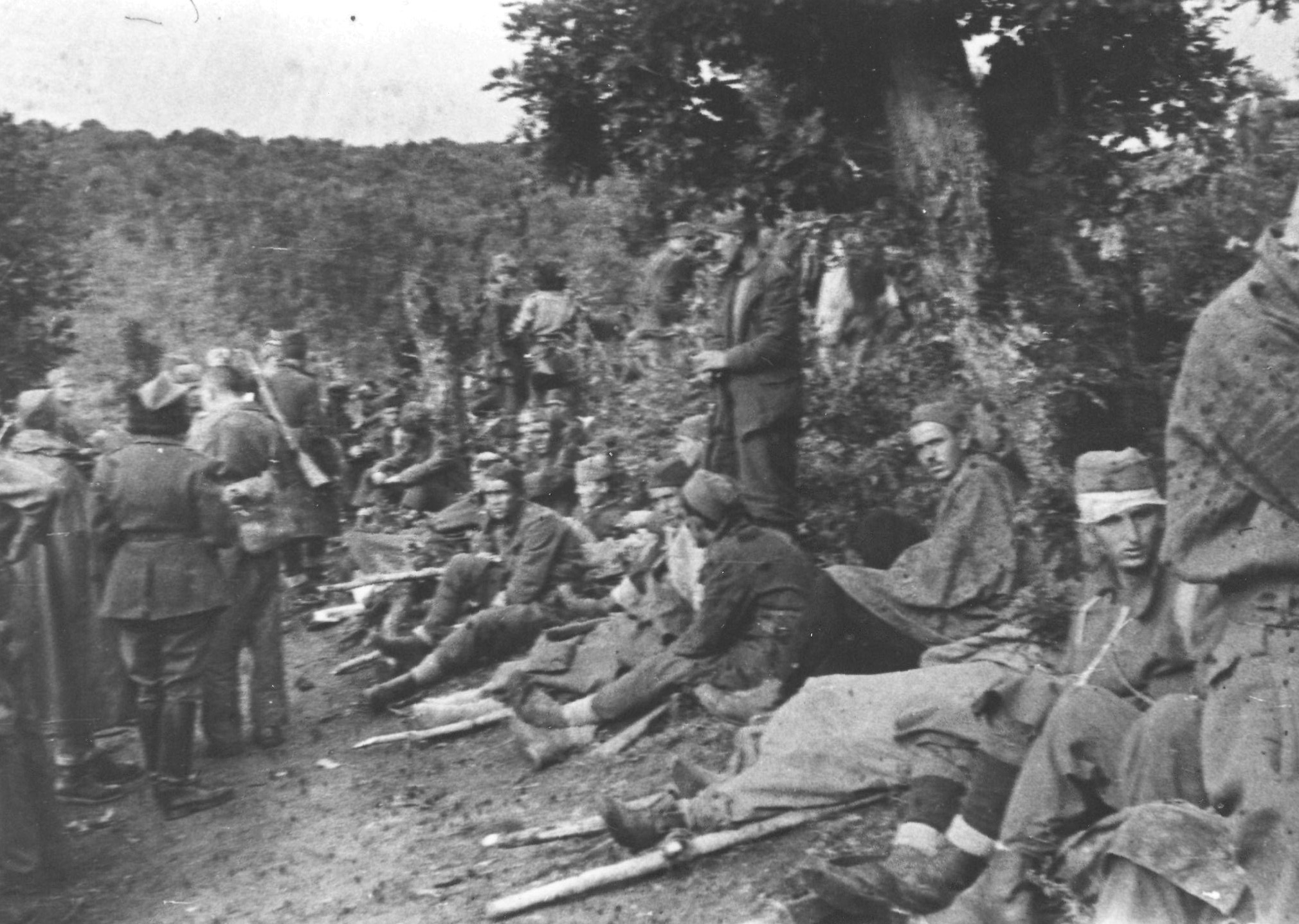
- Exhausted partisans after defeating Germans and breaking into Serbia, 4 August 1944
| Date | 18 July – 1 August 1944 |
| Location | parts of German-occupied Montenegro and Albania (northeastern Montenegro and southwestern Serbia) |
| Result | Yugoslav Partisan victory: Heavy casualties on 21st SS Skanderbeg |

Belligerents
| Germany: Albania | Yugoslav Partisans |

Commanders and leaders
| Artur Phleps | Peko Dapčević |

Units involved
| 21st SS Skanderbeg and support units | (Yugoslav Partisans) Parts of the II Assault Corps |

Strength
| Unknown | Unknown |

Casualties and losses
| 900 killed 200 captured | (Yugoslav Partisans) Very light |
- 500+ civilians (mostly Montenegrins and Serbs)

The Operation Draufgänger (German for "daredevil"; Serbian: Операција Драуфгенгер/Operacija Draufgenger) was a German Wehrmacht military operation against the Yugoslav Partisans at the Montenegrin-Serbian border area, aimed at breaking the Partisan foothold on the Lim river which was a potential penetration point into Serbia. In turn, it was a Partisan counter-operation, known as the Andrijevica Operation (Serbian: Андријевичка операција/Andrijevačka operacija). The operation began on 18 July on the Čakor–Gusinje–Andrijevica–Berane line, when Kampfgruppe E burnt down at least 16 villages and killed several hundred inhabitants. From different directions, German troops attacked villages and a part approached Andrijevica, pushed out parts of two Partisan brigades, and then took over the town on 19 July and continued attacking. The staffs of the Partisan brigades assessed the combined German forces as inadequate and decided to attack, resulting in great German losses. With the possibility to surround and destroy German forces, the II Assault Corps gave the operational command on 23 July to launch a general attack. From different directions the German troops were surrounded in the wider region of Murino on 24 July. On 28 July the Partisan 2nd, 5th and 17th divisions were ordered to move across the Ibar, which gave the opportunity for the 14th Regiment SS to break through Čakor towards Peć, with a larger part of the 21st Division SS Albanian division following the retreat. The German troops were decisively defeated, and the Partisans moved into Serbia to undertake further operations. Operation Rübezahl followed.

At Velika, on 28 July, the 21st Division made up of Albanians killed at least 428 civilians, mostly children, women and elderly, as a reprisal for local support for the Partisans.

== Order of battle ==
=== Axis ===
- 21st Waffen Mountain Division of the SS Skanderbeg (main force)
- 14th Regiment of the 7th SS Volunteer Mountain Division Prinz Eugen
- Brandenburgers
- Krempler Legion
- Part of 201 Brigade assault artillery
- Kampfgruppe Strippel, reinforced by the Grenadier-Regiment 363 of the 181st Infantry Division
- Kampfgruppe Bendl, made up of two Albanian army/militia battalions The Krempler Legion was attached to this battlegroup in September 1944
- Parts of the 5th SS Police Regiment
- Vulnetari

=== Yugoslav Partisans ===
- Parts of the 2nd Assault Corps
  - 2nd Proletarian Division
  - 3rd Assault Division
  - 5th Krajina Division
  - 17th East-Bosnian Assault Division

== Sources ==
- Antonijević, Nenad (2009). Mirković, Jovan (ed.). Албански злочини над Србима на Косову и Метохији у Другом светском рату, документа, друго измењено и допуњено издање (PDF). Belgrade: Музеј жртава геноцида.
- Božović, Branislav (1991). Surova vremena na Kosovu i Metohiji: kvislinzi i kolaboracija u drugom svetskom ratu. Institut za savremenu istoriju. ISBN 9788674030400.
- Colić, Mladenko (1988). Pregled operacija na jugoslovenskom ratištu 1941–1945. Vojnoistorijski Institut.
- Glišić, Venceslav (1970). Teror i zločini nacističke Nemačke u Srbiji 1941–1944. Belgrade: Rad.
- Tomasevich, Jozo (1975). War and Revolution in Yugoslavia, 1941–1945: The Chetniks. Stanford, California: Stanford University Press. ISBN 978-0-8047-0857-9.
- Vojnoistorijski institut (1965). Oslobodilački rat naroda Jugoslavije 1941–1945. Vol. 2. Belgrade: Vojnoistorijski institut.
- Vukanović, Radovan (1970). "Други дио – ДЕЈСТВА ДИВИЗИЈЕ У САСТАВУ 2. НОУ КОРПУСА — стварање и одбрана слободне територије у Црној Гори" (PDF). РАТНИ ПУТ ТРЕЋЕ ДИВИЗИЈЕ. Београд: Војноиздавачки завод.
- Vukanović, Radovan (1982). "Глава IV – СТВАРАЊЕ И ОБЕЗБЈЕЂЕЊЕ ОПЕРАТИВНЕ ОСНОВЕ ЗА ПРИКУПЉАЊЕ ЈЕДИНИЦА НОВЈ И ЊИХОВ ПРОДОР У СРБИЈУ" (PDF). Други ударни корпус. Београд: Војноиздавачки завод.
- Друга пролетерска бригада 1942—1992 – илустрована монографија. Београд. 1992.
  - "1944: Продор у Србију" (PDF). Друга пролетерска бригада 1942—1992 – илустрована монографија.
- Draufgenger. Izveštaj 21. SS-brdske divizije Skenderbeg od 1. avgusta 1944. komandi 21. brdskog armijskog korpusa o toku i rezultatima operacije Draufgenger na prostoru Andrijevica – Berane – Murino [Report on SS "Skanderbeg" during Operation Draufgänger].
