= Velika massacre =

1944 SS killing of Serbs in Yugoslavia

- Part of World War II in Yugoslavia
- Location: Velika, German-occupied Montenegro
- Date: 28 July 1944
- Target: Serbs
- Attack type: Mass killings
- Deaths: 428–550
- Perpetrators: SS Prinz Eugen; SS Skanderbeg; Vullnetari
- Motive: Reprisal; Anti-Serb sentiment

The Velika massacre was the mass killing of between 428 and 550 Serb civilians by the 7th SS Volunteer Mountain Division Prinz Eugen and 21st Waffen Mountain Division of the SS Skanderbeg on 28 July 1944 in the settlement of Velika, in Plav, Montenegro during World War II.

== Background ==
Following the invasion of Yugoslavia by the Axis powers in April 1941, the country was partitioned and Montenegro was occupied by Fascist Italy. After the Italian surrender in September 1943, the territory was occupied by German forces which withdrew in December 1944. In parts of Montenegro, Chetniks collaborated with German and Italian forces while in the northern region some local ethnic Albanians and Bosnian Muslims collaborated with Germans, either as part of the Albanian nationalist Balli Kombëtar movement or local Muslim units.

In July 1944, the German Wehrmacht conducted Operation Draufgänger against the Serb-led Yugoslav Partisans of the region who had established a firm foothold in the Lim River in the Montenegrin part of Sandžak. The operation began on 18 July on the Čakor–Gusinje–Andrijevica–Berane line, when Kampfgruppe E consisting of SS Skanderbeg soldiers along with Vulnetari burnt down at least 16 villages and killed several hundreds inhabitants.

The operation resulted in a Partisan victory and military defeat for the Germans and their allies. As reprisal for the defeat, the civilian population of Velika was massacred.

== Massacre ==
The main perpetrators of the massacre, the 7th SS Volunteer Mountain Division Prinz Eugen, was notorious for the cruelty they inflicted on the civilian population. They were formed in 1941 by both Germans and ethnic German volunteers from Yugoslavia, Hungary and Romania. The 21st Waffen Mountain Division of the SS Skanderbeg, primarily consisting of ethnic Albanians, also participated in the atrocities along with Muslim collaborators.

Historian Nenad Antonijevic writes that there were at least 428 victims, primarily women, children and the elderly. Other historians put the number of victims at around 550. The manner in which they were killed was particularly brutal. The Montenegrin journalist Gojko Knezevic cites the testimony of an 11-year-old child who watched as her parents were killed by soldiers cursing in Serbian. A nine-year-old boy was skinned alive by two men, while pregnant women and others were burned alive. It is estimated that the rampage lasted for two hours and roughly half of Velika's population was killed that day.

== Legacy ==
The massacre was first reported by the Montenegrin Pobjeda newspaper in 1945 following testimonials from Partisans who buried the victims. The testimonies of survivors were first published in 1989, prior to the Breakup of Yugoslavia. The atrocities were never fully investigated. Historians point out that the Yugoslav government remained silent on crimes that weren't solely perpetrated by German units in order to avoid ethnic tensions in the post-war state.

Velika locals erected a monument for the victims and in May 2017 the Serbian Orthodox Church declared them as martyrs. Velika villagers have called on Montenegrin political representatives to declare the massacre as a genocide, which has caused some controversy. In 2021, representatives of the Montenegrin government attended a commemoration for the event for the first time; these include the Minister of Economic Development Jakov Milatović and Interior Minister Sergej Sekulović.

== Sources ==
- Antonijević, Nenad (2009). "Albanski Zlocini nad Srbima na Kosovu i Metohiji u Drugom Svetskom Ratu" [Albanian Crimes against Serbs in Kosovo and Metohija in World War II] (PDF) (in Serbian). Muzej žrtava genocida.
- Kajosevic, Samir (28 July 2021). "'Genocide' Controversy Erupts over WWII Massacres in Montenegro". Balkan Investigative Reporting Network.
- Zdravkovski, Aleksander (2022). The Sandžak of Novi Pazar: Millets, Nations, Empires. Rowman & Littlefield. ISBN 9781793641816.
