= 21st Waffen Mountain Division of the SS Skanderbeg =

German mountain division of World War II

21st Waffen Mountain Division of the SS Skanderbeg (1st Albanian)
- Divisional symbol (Note: This symbol (exactly as depicted) is described by Keegan and Bishop as the divisional badge, and by Littlejohn as the "official vehicle sign of the division".)
- Active: 1 May – 1 November 1944
- Country: Germany
- Branch: Waffen-SS
- Type: Mountain infantry
- Role: Anti-partisan operations
- Size: Division (6,000–6,500 men – never reached divisional strength)
- Part of: XXI Mountain Corps
- Garrison/HQ: Prizren
- Nickname: Skanderbeg
- Engagements: World War II; Operation Endlich; Operation Falkenauge; Operation Rübezahl; Operation Draufgänger; Stracin–Kumanovo operation; Kosovo Operation; First Battle of Preševo

Commanders
- Notable commanders: August Schmidhuber

Insignia
- Identification symbol: Albanian double-headed eagle

The 21st Waffen Mountain Division of the SS Skanderbeg (1st Albanian) was a German mountain infantry division of the Waffen-SS, the armed wing of the German Nazi Party that served alongside, but was never formally part of, the Wehrmacht during World War II. SS Skanderbeg was based on the priority of the government of Rexhep Mitrovica.. At the post-war Nuremberg trials, the Waffen-SS was declared to be a criminal organisation due to its major involvement in war crimes and crimes against humanity.

The division was developed around the nucleus of an ethnic Albanian battalion which had briefly seen combat against the Yugoslav Partisans in eastern Bosnia as part of the 13th Waffen Mountain Division of the SS Handschar (1st Croatian). The rank-and-file were mostly Muslim Albanians with a few hundred Catholic Albanians and mostly German and Yugoslav Volksdeutsche (ethnic German) officers and non-commissioned officers, it was given the title Skanderbeg after medieval Albanian lord George Kastrioti Skanderbeg, who defended the region of Albania against the Ottoman Empire for more than two decades in the 15th century.

Skanderbeg never reached divisional strength, being at most a brigade-sized formation of between 6,000 and 6,500 troops. In May 1944, members of the division arrested 281 Jews in Pristina and handed them over to the Germans, who transported them to the Bergen-Belsen concentration camp, where many were killed. The division itself was better known for this action and for murdering, raping, and looting in predominantly Serb areas than for participating in combat operations on behalf of the German war effort. Its only significant military actions took place during a German anti-Partisan offensive in the German occupied territory of Montenegro in June and July 1944. Following those operations, the unit was deployed as a guard force at the chromium mines in Kosovo, where it was quickly overrun by the Partisans, leading to widespread desertion. Reinforced by German Kriegsmarine personnel and with fewer than 500 Albanians remaining in its ranks, it was disbanded on 1 November 1944. The remaining members were incorporated into the 7th SS Volunteer Mountain Division Prinz Eugen. After the war, divisional commander SS-Brigadeführer und Generalmajor der Waffen-SS August Schmidhuber was found guilty of war crimes by a court in Belgrade and executed in 1947.

== History ==
=== Background ===
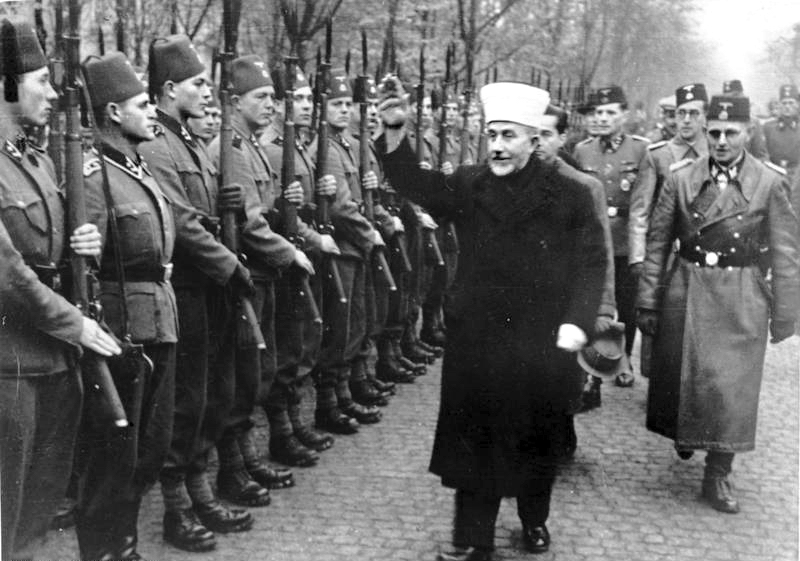
The Mufti of Jerusalem, Mohammad Amin al-Husayni, reviewing soldiers of the 13th SS Division in November 1943. The division included an estimated 1,000 Albanians from Kosovo and the Sandžak who later formed the nucleus of Skanderbeg.

On 7 April 1939, five months prior to the outbreak of World War II, Italy invaded Albania. The country was overrun in five days, and Italian King Victor Emmanuel III accepted the crown offered by the Parliament of Albania. The Royal Albanian Army was incorporated into the Royal Italian Army and a viceroy was appointed to administer the country as a protectorate. Following the Axis invasion of Yugoslavia on 6 April 1941, Italian Albania was expanded to include adjacent parts of the Kingdom of Yugoslavia incorporated mainly from the Yugoslav banovinas (regional subdivisions) of Vardar and Morava. Most of Kosovo was annexed to Albania, and in the beginning, Albanians living there enthusiastically welcomed the Italian occupation. Some Kosovo Albanians even suggested that Albanians were "Aryans of Illyrian heritage". Although officially under Italian rule, the Albanians in Kosovo were given control of the region and encouraged to open Albanian-language schools, which had been banned by the Yugoslav government. The Italians also gave the inhabitants Albanian citizenship and allowed them to fly the flag of Albania. The Royal Italian Army expelled most of the Serbs and Montenegrins that had settled Kosovo during the interwar period. The Kosovo Albanians despised the Serbs for the oppression they had experienced at their hands during the Balkan Wars, World War I, and under Yugoslav rule. They took advantage of their changed circumstances, attacked their Serb neighbours, and burned the homes of as many as 30,000 Serb and Montenegrin settlers.

Albania remained occupied by Italy until its surrender to the Allies in September 1943. In August of that year, faced with the imminent collapse of the Italian war effort, Germany deployed the 2nd Panzer Army to the Balkans to take over areas previously occupied by Italy. One of the Italian areas seized by the Germans was Albania, where the XXI Mountain Corps of Generaloberst (Note: Equivalent to a U.S. Army general.) Lothar Rendulic's 2nd Panzer Army had been deployed. A Wehrmacht plenipotentiary general, and a special representative of Heinrich Himmler, SS-Brigadeführer und Generalmajor der Waffen-SS und Polizei (Note: Equivalent to a U.S. Army brigadier general.) Josef Fitzthum, were both based in the Albanian capital of Tirana. The Germans took control of all Albanian forces that had been collaborating with the Italians prior to their capitulation, including the Balli Kombëtar, an anti-communist and nationalist militia. The Germans strengthened the Albanian army and gendarmerie, but quickly decided those troops were unreliable. That year, a number of Albanians from Kosovo and the Sandžak region were recruited into the 13th Waffen Mountain Division of the SS Handschar (1st Croatian), a Waffen-SS division composed largely of Bosnian Muslims and Croats with mostly German officers, that operated in the puppet Independent State of Croatia (Croatian: Nezavisna Država Hrvatska, NDH). A key recruiter amongst Albanians for the Waffen-SS was SS-Standartenführer (Note: Equivalent to a U.S. Army colonel.) Karl von Krempler. For about six months the division included about 1,000 ethnic Albanians from Kosovo and the Sandžak who made up the 1st Battalion of the 2nd Regiment (I/2), which later became the 1st Battalion of the 28th Regiment (I/28). The division later recruited a further 500 men from the Sandžak. The Mufti of Jerusalem, Haj Amin al-Husseini assisted in organising and recruiting Muslims into the Waffen-SS and other units. The Mufti also visited in order to bless and inspect the 13th SS Division, during which he used the Nazi salute.

The formation of an Albanian Waffen-SS division was Fitzthum's idea, initially opposed by the German Foreign Ministry representative for the Balkans Hermann Neubacher, and also by the head of the Reich Security Main Office SS-Obergruppenführer und General der Polizei (Note: Equivalent to a U.S. Army lieutenant general.) Ernst Kaltenbrunner, who influenced Himmler to shelve it. But the Albanian government supported the idea; in the face of increasing difficulties Himmler soon changed his mind, and in February 1944 the idea received Adolf Hitler's approval.

=== Formation ===
In February 1944, Hitler approved the creation of an Albanian Waffen-SS division that was to serve only inside Kosovo, and was intended to protect ethnic Albanians but remain under German control. It was meant to be one of three Muslim Waffen-SS divisions serving in the Balkans, the other two being the 13th SS Division and the 23rd Waffen Mountain Division of the SS Kama (2nd Croatian). Himmler's goal was to expand Waffen-SS recruiting in the Balkans and form two corps of two divisions each, with one corps to operate in the region of Bosnia in the Independent State of Croatia and the other in Albania. These corps would then be combined with the Volksdeutsche 7th SS Volunteer Mountain Division Prinz Eugen and together would form a Balkan Waffen-SS mountain army of five divisions. In March 1944, Bedri Pejani, the chairman of the Second League of Prizren, an organisation created after the Italian surrender to advance the interests of Kosovo Albanians, proposed to Hitler that a force of 120,000–150,000 Kosovo Albanian volunteers be raised to fight the Yugoslav and Albanian partisans. Pejani asked the German leadership to give the Albanians equipment and supplies to fight the communist insurgency, and requested the expansion of the borders of the German puppet state of Albania at the expense of the German occupied territory of Serbia and the German occupied territory of Montenegro. These requests were not fulfilled. Nevertheless, in April 1944, Himmler ordered the establishment of the new Albanian volunteer division that Hitler had authorised. It was subsequently named after the medieval Albanian warrior Skanderbeg. By this point, the Germans and some members of the Albanian puppet government believed that about 50,000 ethnic Albanians could be recruited to join the Waffen-SS. The Germans had initially envisioned a force of 10,000–12,000 men for the Albanian SS division. Himmler saw the Muslim Albanians as a potential source of manpower in Germany's war against the Yugoslav Partisans, who faced significant difficulties in recruiting Kosovo Albanians to join their ranks.

On 17 April 1944, the Albanian battalion of the 13th SS Division was transferred via rail directly from combat in Bosnia to Kosovo to form part of the new Albanian division. (Note: Neubacher reported that about 4,000 Albanians had served in the 13th SS Division. The historians Xavier Bougarel, Alexander Korb, Stefan Petke and Franziska Zaugg observe that this estimate seems "overly high" given there was only one Albanian battalion in that division.) The head of Waffen-SS recruitment, SS-Obergruppenführer Gottlob Berger, reported to Himmler that the Albanians "... were quite sad about leaving." Himmler himself expected "great usefulness" from the unit since the Albanians that fought in the 13th SS Division had proven to be "highly motivated and disciplined" in the fight against the Partisans in the NDH. After the war, Bosnian Muslim former members of the 13th SS Division stated that while with the division the Albanians had shot unarmed civilians and were "very brutal".

On 23 May, Fitzthum noted the failure of the Albanian units that had been used in operations against the Partisans. He reported that he had dissolved four Albanian battalions organised by the Wehrmacht, describing most Albanian army and gendarmerie officers as "totally corrupt, unusable, undisciplined and untrainable." (Note: In a report to Himmler, Fitzthum wrote that, "[f]or the currently existing Albanian formations an alteration in the future cannot be expected to be brought about even by thorough training. They will never become a serious and employable troop." Despite the Germans trying to depict them as "the perfect Albanian warrior", Fitzthum argued that the Albanians from Kosovo and the northern part of Albania proper had a completely different conception of warfare than the Germans and were not familiar with fighting in large units or against artillery.) The Germans found that Kosovo Albanians were more cooperative than Albanians from Albania-proper. This was mainly because they feared a return to Yugoslav rule. Thus, many of the division's recruits were Kosovo Albanians, although some were refugees from Albania-proper. The quality of most of these recruits was poor, and only between 6,000 and 6,500 were considered suitable to receive training. Those that were accepted were a combination of about 1,500 former Royal Yugoslav Army prisoners of war, elements of the failed Albanian army and gendarmerie, volunteers from both pre-war and expanded Albania, and conscripts from families that had more than two sons. Unlike the Albanians in the Handschar division, who received extensive training in France and then Neuhammer training grounds in Germany, the new recruits underwent a very short training period of only six weeks. The Albanians may have joined for a range of reasons, including access to modern weapons and military training, to help revise the borders of Albania, revenge, and even the opportunity for looting.

The enlistment of Albanian civilians was organised in close cooperation with the Albanian puppet government. In June 1944, Neubacher successfully displaced Pejani, whom he considered "insane". The Albanian Minister of the Interior and new chairman of the Second League of Prizren, Xhafer Deva, was a key factor in recruiting Albanians for the new division. Fitzthum, who had developed a close friendship with Deva, noted that the right-wing and anti-Serb politician was vital for German recruitment efforts. In contrast to the 13th SS Division, the use of Islam as an incentive to join the Waffen-SS disappeared completely from the German agenda, while the utilisation of ethnic tensions became much more important. No field imam is documented in the new division and ideological training was avoided entirely, because the Germans feared that such instruction would upset their new recruits. According to Nazi propaganda, the division was to source its manpower exclusively from Muslim Albanians, but the reality was different. While the vast majority of the division's Albanians were Bektashi or Sunni Muslims, "several hundred" Albanian Catholics also served in the division.

=== Operations ===
==== May–August 1944 ====
The division was founded as the 21. Waffen-SS Gebirgsdivision der SS Skanderbeg (albanische Nr.1) on 1 May 1944, as part of the XXI Mountain Corps. Most or all of the division's officers, non-commissioned officers (NCOs), and specialists were German, and were mainly provided by the 7th and 13th SS Divisions, which noticeably weakened those formations. The divisional artillery regiment was formed from the 1st Albanian Artillery Regiment. The division was placed under the command of SS-Standartenführer August Schmidhuber, who was promoted to SS-Oberführer (Note: This rank had no U.S. Army equivalent. It was senior to a colonel but junior to a brigadier general.) in June. Members took a religious oath using the Quran, pledging "jihad against unbelievers." The division was originally equipped with captured Italian Carro Armato M15/42 tanks, which proved to be unreliable. Its garrison was located in the town of Prizren.

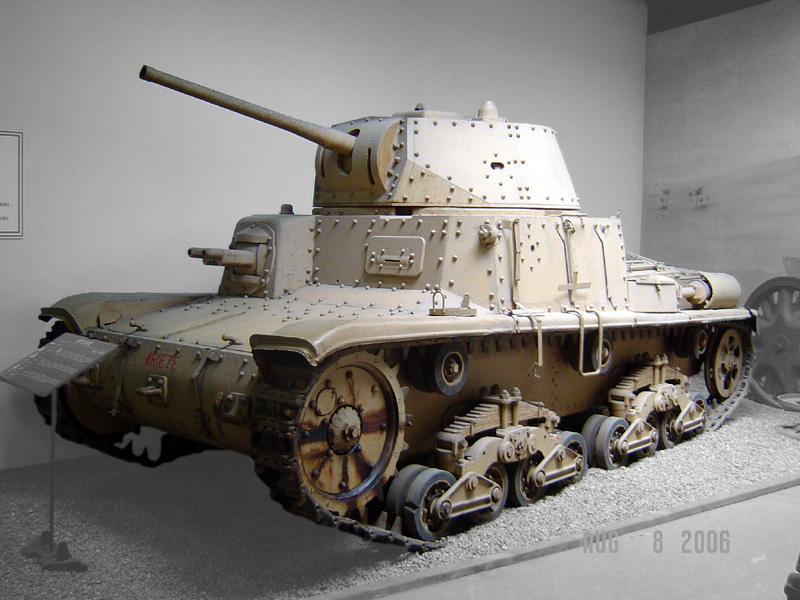
The division was supplied with captured Italian Carro Armato M15/42 tanks, but they proved to be unreliable.

The division was to be responsible for security in Kosovo, including transport routes, the defence of economically important objects such as the chrome ore mines in Kukës and Đakovica, as well as offensive action against Yugoslav Partisans operating in the region. Men who had already served in the 13th SS Division were also deployed as guards at a concentration camp in Pristina. Early on, it became clear that most of the division's Muslim Albanian members seemed to be interested only in settling scores with their Christian Serb adversaries, who became the target of numerous atrocities. In order to put a stop to the crimes, the Germans had to disarm battalions of the division in the towns of Peć and Prizren and arrest the Albanian officers, with one commanding officer even being sent to prison in Germany. On 14 May 1944, members of the division raided Jewish homes in Pristina, arrested 281 Jews and handed them over to the Germans, who sent them to the Bergen-Belsen concentration camp, where many were killed. The historian Noel Malcolm describes this event as "the most shameful episode in Kosovo's wartime history." The division was later involved in a massacre of Albanian partisans. It was also responsible for the expulsion of up to 10,000 Slavic families from Kosovo as new Albanian settlers arrived from the poor areas of northern Albania. The arrival of these Albanians was encouraged by Italian authorities, and it is estimated that as many as 72,000 Albanians were settled or re-settled in Kosovo during the war. Between 28 May and 5 July 1944, the division apprehended a total of 510 Jews, communists and other anti-fascists and turned them over to the Germans. It also carried out retaliatory hangings of suspected saboteurs.

In June 1944, Skanderbeg engaged in large-scale field manoeuvres in eastern Montenegro. In Andrijevica, the division summarily executed more than 400 Orthodox Christian civilians. It participated in Operations Endlich (Finally) and Falkenauge (Hawkeye) in June and July, as well as Operation Draufgänger (Daredevil), the first phase of Operation Rübezahl, which ran from 5 to 22 August. During Operation Draufgänger Skanderbeg was the main force used by the Germans. These operations were focused on the destruction of strong Partisan forces in the Đakovica, Peć and Mokra Gora areas. During the operation on 28 July 1944, the division together with the 7th SS Volunteer Mountain Division Prinz Eugen, massacred around 550 Serb villagers in the settlement of Velika, in Plav, Montenegro. By the end of Operation Draufgänger, more than 400 men of the division had deserted or otherwise gone missing. According to Neubacher, the division was carelessly committed to fighting in the early stages of its training and performed poorly. Between 18 and 27 August, the division fought the Partisans in and around Debar but failed to capture the city. During the summer of 1944, Deva was sidelined within the League. Fitzthum was so concerned about the impact that this would have on the development of the division that he wrote to Himmler. By the end of August 1944, the Germans had decided that the division was only of use for basic guarding duties. Some members were charged with guarding chromium mines near Kosovo before the area was overrun by the Partisans. In the ensuing clashes, one of the division's regiments lost more than 1,000 men and many Albanians deserted. Some of the desertions occurred after a Partisan offensive northeast of Gusinje. Army Group E reported that the division's performance showed that it had "absolutely no military value."

==== September–November 1944 ====
On 1 September 1944, members of the division stationed in Tetovo and Gostivar mutinied, killing their German officers and NCOs. By this time, the division numbered fewer than 7,000 men, less than one third of its intended strength. Within two months of its initial deployment, 3,500 had deserted. Himmler brought in 3,000–4,000 Kriegsmarine (German navy) personnel from Greece to make up the numbers, but this had little effect on the division's fighting ability. The desertions were mainly caused by Germany's defeats, serious shortfalls in food and equipment, as well as from observing constant overflights by the United States Army Air Force, Allied propaganda, and the approaching end of Germany's military hegemony in the Balkans. Further reasons for the escalating number of desertions included the news that both Bulgaria and Romania had joined the Allies, Josip Broz Tito's amnesty which ended on 15 September, and a demand by Albania's Party of Labour that fighting-age men join the National Liberation Front.

By the beginning of October 1944, the division's strength had fallen to about 4,900 men, fewer than 1,500 of whom were fit for combat. Between April and October, 3,425 had deserted, constituting over half the division's strength. Schmidhuber reported that even the 697 members of the battalion that had served in the 13th SS Division had deserted. The unit was blighted by shortages of equipment and armaments, and a lack of German staff to train new recruits, as demonstrated by the fact that over the summer and autumn only a single battalion had been readied for combat. Schmidhuber held his men in contempt, and he, his superiors, and Fitzthum attempted to justify their failure to create an effective security force by denigrating the Albanians' culture and military reputation. Schmidhuber also linked the failure of the division to the lack of time for proper military training, ideological training and the absence of suitable instructors. Later, less-involved members of the Wehrmacht stated that the principal issue regarding the unit's reliability may have been that the Germans did not work closely with the Albanians at the local level. In mid-October, the division was engaged in heavy fighting around Đakovica. It also aided the Wehrmacht in its orderly withdrawal from Kosovo, covering the Wehrmacht's flanks and engaging the Partisans. By this time, desertions had significantly affected the division's strength, and its 86 officers and 467 NCOs were left with a force of only 899 men, about half of whom were Albanian. On 24 October, Generaloberst Alexander Löhr, the commander of Army Group E, ordered that all Albanian members of the division be disarmed and released. Between 19 September and 23 October, 131 anti-fascist guerrillas had been shot or hanged by members of the division acting on Schmidhuber's orders.

On 1 November 1944, the division was disbanded. Kosovo Albanians took up arms against the Partisans upon learning that the region would not be unified with Albania after the war, despite earlier Partisan promises. Atrocities occurred when 30,000 Partisans were sent to Kosovo to quell Albanian resistance in the region. Between 3,000 and 25,000 Kosovo Albanians were killed in the ensuing violence. (Note: Some Albanian sources place the number of deaths at between 36,000 and 47,000, but according to Malcolm, such claims are greatly exaggerated.)

== Aftermath and legacy ==
The remaining German troops and former naval personnel were reorganised as the regimental Kampfgruppe Skanderbeg under the command of SS-Obersturmbannführer Alfred Graf. The unit withdrew from the Kosovo region in mid-November along with the rest of the German troops in the area. Many Serbs and Montenegrins then took revenge against the region's ethnic Albanians, especially collaborators and those who had been members of the division. In his strongly apologetic history of the 7th SS Division, which he commanded at the time, Otto Kumm wrote that Kampfgruppe Skanderbeg reached Ljubovija on the Drina river, it was placed under the command of the 7th SS Division, which was securing the river crossings in that area. According to Kumm, the Kampfgruppe held the towns of Zvornik and Drinjača during the first half of December 1944 as part of the Ljubovija bridgehead. It withdrew across the Drina and fought its way north, towards Brčko on the Sava river, where it relieved the Wehrmacht forces holding the town. In late December, the Kampfgruppe's assault gun battery was committed to the Syrmian Front at Vinkovci. The remainder of the Kampfgruppe was deployed to Bijeljina.

In January 1945, the handful of naval personnel that survived were transferred to the 32nd SS Volunteer Grenadier Division 30 Januar, and the remnants of the former division were reorganised as II Battalion of the 14th SS Volunteer Mountain Infantry Regiment of the 7th SS Division. On 21 January 1945, Schmidhuber was promoted to SS-Brigadeführer und Generalmajor der Waffen-SS and placed in command of the 7th SS Division. After the war, he was found guilty of war crimes and hanged. In February 1945, the battalion was disbanded altogether and its remaining manpower was assigned to the German police regiment near Zagreb. (Note: According to George H. Stein, the men from II Battalion fought with the 7th SS Division until February 1945, when they were sent north to defend the Oder–Neisse line.)

The division itself was considered to have been a military failure. Not one of its members was awarded an Iron Cross while serving in it. Schmidhuber and the staff of XXI Mountain Corps blamed the division's failure solely on the Albanian personnel. Schmidhuber claimed that Albanians had stagnated culturally since Skanderbeg's time in the fifteenth century, and both he and the corps staff claimed that the Albanians had not developed national or state traditions. Schmidhuber argued that the legend of Albanian military achievements was just a saga. Further, he claimed that "[w]ith a light mortar you can basically chase him [the Albanian] around the world. During the attack he goes only as far as he finds something to steal or sack. For him, the war is over when he captures a goat, a ploughshare or the wheel of a sewing machine." Fitzthum was one of the harshest critics of their soldiers. Fitzthum complained to Hitler personally: 'For the currently existing Albanian formations an alteration in the future cannot be expected to be brought about even by thorough training. They will never become a serious and employable troop'. Fitzthum went as far as saying that "the Albanian soldier is undisciplined and cowardly". Fitzthum additionally angrily wrote to Himmler, that one battalion dissolved after being attacked by a few planes and the rest just disappeared. Professor Paul Mojzes writes that the division was better known for committing atrocities against Serbs than it was for contributing to the German war effort. Its role in deporting Jews from Kosovo has been challenged by the Albanian historian Shaban Sinani, who claims that the division did not participate in any deportations on the Germans' behalf. It was reported that some soldiers from the division deserted the division to join the partisan unit led by Gani Kryeziu after refusing to fight it.

The post-war Nuremberg trials made the declaratory judgement that the Waffen-SS was a criminal organisation due to its major involvement in war crimes and crimes against humanity, including the killing of prisoners-of-war and atrocities committed in occupied countries. Excluded from this judgement were those who were conscripted into the Waffen-SS and had not personally committed war crimes and crimes against humanity.

During the Kosovo War of 1998–1999, the American journalist Chris Hedges alleged that some Kosovo Liberation Army leaders were directly descended from members of the division and were ideologically influenced by it. Malcolm has challenged this claim.

== Insignia ==
The division's identification symbol, used on its vehicles, was a black Albanian double-headed eagle. Despite its short existence, a collar patch depicting the goat-crested helmet of Skanderbeg was designed and manufactured for the division, but it was withdrawn from service after a trial as it was unrecognisable from a distance. As a result, officers of the division wore the collar patch with the SS runes, and enlisted ranks wore a plain black collar patch. Photographs exist of a machine-woven cuff band with the title Skanderbeg, but this was awarded to the 14th SS Volunteer Gebirgsjäger Regiment of the 7th SS Division in the latter part of 1944, and not to this division. Albanian members of the division wore an arm shield on their upper left arm depicting a black Albanian double-headed eagle on a red shield with black backing. Many of the division's Muslim members wore traditional grey-coloured skull caps with the SS eagle and death's head on the front instead of the standard SS field cap. Others wore the traditional Albanian highlander hat, the qeleshe.

== Order of battle ==
The principal units of the division and order of battle were:

- 50th Waffen Gebirgsjäger (Mountain Infantry) Regiment of the SS (1st Albanian) (I, II, III battalions)
- 51st Waffen Gebirgsjäger Regiment of the SS (2nd Albanian) (I, II, III battalions)
- 21st SS Reconnaissance Battalion (four companies)
- 21st SS Freiwilligen (Volunteer) Panzerjäger (Anti-tank) Battalion (three companies)
- 21st SS Gebirgs (Mountain) Artillery Regiment (four battalions)
- 21st SS Freiwilligen Pioneer Battalion (three companies)
- 21st SS Feldersatz (Replacement) Battalion
- 21st SS Freiwilligen Signals Battalion (three companies)
- 21st SS Mountain Supply Troop

== See also ==
- List of Waffen-SS units
- Table of ranks and insignia of the Waffen-SS
- Waffen-SS foreign volunteers and conscripts
- The Holocaust in Albania
- List of military units named after people
