= Graovo =

Graovo may refer to:

- Graovo, a village in Jablanica District, Serbia
- Graovo, a region in western Bulgaria
- Graovo Rocks, a group of rocks in the South Shetland Islands, Antarctica

== See also ==
- Grahovo (disambiguation)
- Grabovo (disambiguation)
