= General Fisher =

General Fisher may refer to:

- Bertie Fisher (1878–1972), British Army lieutenant general
- George A. Fisher Jr. (born 1942), U.S. Army lieutenant general
- Louis Matshwenyego Fisher (fl. 1990s–2000s), Botswana Defence Force general

== See also ==
- General Fischer (disambiguation)
- Attorney General Fisher (disambiguation)
