= Attorney General Fisher =

Attorney General Fisher may refer to:

- Charles Fisher (Canadian politician) (1808–1880), Attorney General of Canada
- D. Michael Fisher (born 1944), Attorney General of Pennsylvania
- George P. Fisher (1817–1899), Attorney General of Delaware
- Lee Fisher (born 1951), Attorney General of Ohio

== See also ==
- General Fisher (disambiguation)
