= Eugen-Heinrich Bleyer =

German WWII general

- Born: 20 November 1896; Mainz, Grand Duchy of Hesse, German Empire
- Died: 18 March 1979 (aged 82); Bad Tölz, Bavaria, West Germany
- Military career
- Allegiance: German Empire (to 1918); Weimar Republic (to 1933); Nazi Germany
- Branch: Army (Wehrmacht)
- Service years: 1914–1945
- Rank: Generalleutnant
- Commands: 258. Infanterie-Division; 181. Infanterie-Division
- Conflicts: World War I World War II
- Awards: Knight's Cross of the Iron Cross

Eugen-Heinrich Bleyer (20 November 1896 – 18 March 1979) was a German general during World War II and a recipient of the Knight's Cross of the Iron Cross.

== Biography ==
Eugen-Heinrich Bleyer was born on 20 November 1896 in Mainz in the Grand Duchy of Hesse, German Empire, as the son of Heinrich Bleyer, a railway inspector, and Elise, née Zilles.

Bleyer commenced his military service on 13 August 1914, shortly after the beginning of World War I, as a Fahnenjunker (officer candidate) in Infanterie-Leib-Regiment „Großherzogin“ (3. Großherzoglich Hessisches) Nr. 117. On 8 October 1914, he joined his regiment on the Western Front and was promoted to Leutnant (lieutenant) on 8 May 1915 (with a patent of 22 May 1914). He was transferred to Infanterie-Regiment Nr. 186 on 20 May 1915.

Bleyer spent the entire war on the Western Front and was wounded five times. For his achievements, he earned both classes of the Iron Cross, the Wound Badge in Gold, the Hessian General Honor Decoration "For Bravery" and the Hessian Warrior Decoration in Iron.

Bleyer returned to Infanterie-Regiment Nr. 117 on 5 April 1919 and was soon transferred to the newly formed Reichswehr. He served initially in the Reichswehr-Infanterie-Regiment 36 and then in the Reichswehr-Schützen-Regiment 22 before being transferred to the 15. Infanterie-Regiment on 1 January 1921. On 1 July 1922, he received a seniority date as lieutenant of 1 September 1915. On 31 July 1925, he was promoted to Oberleutnant with effect from 1 April 1925. On 1 October 1930 he was transferred to the 1. Infanterie-Regiment and on 1 January 1931 he was named a company commander in that regiment. He was promoted to Hauptmann on 1 February 1931.

With the formation of the Wehrmacht, Bleyer served as a company commander in Infanterie-Regiment Königsberg and in the Radfahr-Bataillon 1 (Bicycle Battalion 1), on the staff of the 29th Division, and on the staff of the Kommandantur Erfurt. He was promoted to Major on 1 January 1936 and Oberstleutnant on 1 February 1939.

Early in World War II, Bleyer was named commander of the 1st Battalion of the 36th Infantry Regiment (Infanterie-Regiment 36) and led that battalion in the Western campaign. He was named commander of the 379th Infantry Regiment (Infanterie-Regiment 379) on 17 March 1941 and was promoted to Oberst on 1 January 1942. Bleyer commanded the regiment until 24 April 1943 when he was transferred to the Führerreserve (Leaders Reserve) in order to attend a divisional commander's course. On 1 October 1943, Bleyer was tasked with the leadership of the 258th Infantry Division. Upon his promotion to Generalmajor on 1 December 1943, he was named commander of the division. On 1 June 1944, he was promoted to Generalleutnant. From 1 October 1944, Bleyer commanded the 181st Infantry Division.

Bleyer surrendered to the Yugoslavian troops in May 1945. In 1949 he was sentenced to death. However, in 1950, his sentence was commuted to 18 years in prison. He was released from prison in 1952.

After Bleyer's return to Germany, he was engaged in various social projects, for which he was awarded the Federal Republic of Germany's Merit Cross 1st Class. Bleyer died in Bad Tölz, Bavaria on 18 March 1979.

== Awards and decorations ==
- Kingdom of Prussia: Iron Cross (1914) 2nd Class (5 October 1915)
- Kingdom of Prussia: Iron Cross (1914) 1st Class (13 August 1916)
- Grand Duchy of Hesse: General Honor Decoration "For Bravery" (27 October 1915)
- Grand Duchy of Hesse: Warrior Decoration in Iron (Krieger-Ehrenzeichen in Eisen) (22 August 1917)
- German Empire: Wound Badge in Gold (28 June 1918)
- Germany: German Sports Badge, 13 December 1922
- Germany: Honor Cross for Combatants 1914/1918 (15 January 1935)
- Germany: Wehrmacht Long Service Award, 2nd through 4th Class (2 October 1936)
- Germany: 1939 Clasp to the Iron Cross 2nd Class (27 January 1940)
- Germany: 1939 Clasp to the Iron Cross 1st Class (16 June 1940)
- Germany: Knight's Cross of the Iron Cross (14 December 1941)
- Germany: Eastern Front Medal (22 August 1942)
- Germany: Order of Merit of the Federal Republic of Germany, Merit Cross 1st Class (17 August 1967)

Military offices
Preceded by Generalleutnant Hanskurt Höcker	Commander of 258th Infantry Division; 1 October 1943 – 4 September 1944	Succeeded by Oberst Rudolf Hielscher
Preceded by Generalleutnant Hermann Fischer	Commander of 181st Infantry Division; 1 October 1944 – May 1945	Succeeded by None
