= Grahovac (surname) =

Grahovac is a South Slavic surname.

Notable people with the surname include:

- Blagoje Grahovac (born 1949), Montenegrin military officer and journalist
- Branko Grahovac (born 1983), Bosnian footballer
- Gavin Grahovac (born 2005), American baseball player
- Gregor Grahovac (born 2000), Slovenian athlete
- Nebojša Grahovac (born 1984), Bosnian handball player
- Srđan Grahovac (born 1992), Bosnian footballer
- Vladimir Grahovac (born 1975), Serbian politician
