= Grahovo =

Grahovo is a South Slavic toponym that may refer to:

== Places ==
=== Bosnia and Herzegovina ===
- Bosansko Grahovo, a town and municipality
- Grahovo, Velika Kladuša, a village near Velika Kladuša

=== Montenegro ===
- Grahovo (region), a region between Nikšić and the border with Herzegovina
- Grahovo, Nikšić, a small town and former municipality near Nikšić, also a medieval tribe and an honorary title
- Grahovo, Rožaje, a village near Rožaje

=== Slovenia ===
- Grahovo, Cerknica, a village in the Municipality of Cerknica
- Grahovo ob Bači, a village in the Municipality of Tolmin
- Grahovo Brdo, a settlement in the Municipality of Sežana

== Other uses ==
- Grahovo Tribe (Grahovljani)
- Battle of Grahovo (1836)

== See also ==
- Grahovac (disambiguation)
- Grahovci
- Grahova pretepena juha
- Graovo (disambiguation)
- Grabovo (disambiguation)
