= Vladimir Grahovac =

Serbian politician

Vladimir Grahovac (Serbian Cyrillic: Владимир Граховац born 1975) is a politician in Serbia. He has served in the National Assembly of Serbia since 2020 as a member of the Serbian Progressive Party.

== Early life and private career ==
Grahovac was born in Subotica, Vojvodina, in what was then the Socialist Republic of Serbia in the Socialist Federal Republic of Yugoslavia. He is an economic technician and is the secretary of MZ Centar III in the community.

== Politician ==
=== Municipal politics ===
Grahovac has been a candidate for the Subotica municipal assembly on three occasions. He was originally a member of the Democratic Party of Serbia and, while still a student, appeared in the third position on the party's electoral list in the 2004 Serbian local elections. The list narrowly fell below the electoral threshold to win representation in the assembly.

The Democratic Party of Serbia contested the 2012 Serbian local elections in Subotica in an alliance with the far-right Serbian Radical Party and the Serbian Democratic Party. Grahovac received the forty-sixth position on the coalition's list. The list won six mandates, and he was not returned.

He later left the Democratic Party of Serbia to join the Progressive Party, receiving the fortieth position on the party's list in the 2016 local elections. The list won thirty-one seats, and he was again not elected.

=== Parliamentarian ===
Grahovac was given the 188th position on the Progressive Party's Aleksandar Vučić — For Our Children list for the 2020 Serbian parliamentary election and was elected when the list won a landslide majority with exactly 188 out of 250 mandates. He is a member of the committee on labour, social issues, social inclusion, and poverty reduction; a deputy member of the environmental protection committee and the committee on human and minority rights and gender equality; and a member of the parliamentary friendship groups with China, Hungary, Mexico, Moldova, Morocco, the Philippines, Portugal, Slovenia, and Turkey.
