= Grahovac =

Grahovac may refer to:

- Grahovac, Montenegro, a village near Nikšić
- Grahovac (surname), a South Slavic surname
