= Grabovo, Ražanj =

Grabovo Грабово
- Village
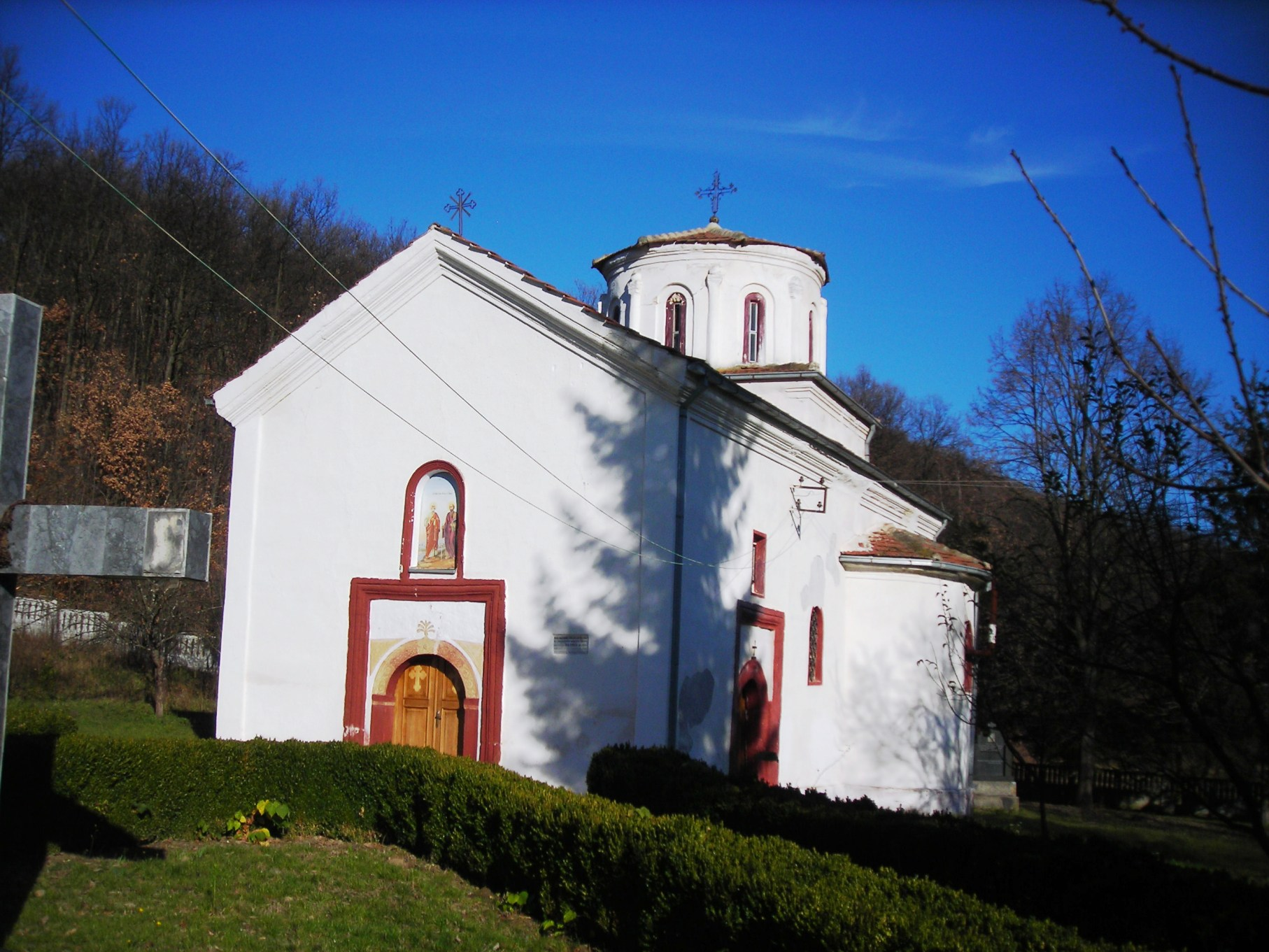

- Location within Serbia
- Coordinates: 43°43′54″N 21°37′53″E
- Country: Serbia
- District: Nišava District
- Municipality: Ražanj

Population (2002)
  - Total: 193
- Time zone: UTC+1 (CET)
  - Summer (DST): UTC+2 (CEST)

Grabovo is a village in the municipality of Ražanj, Serbia. According to the 2002 census, the village has a population of 193 people.
