= Hermann Fischer (general) =

German general (1894–1968)

- Born: Hermann Julius Fischer; 19 February 1894; Ostheim vor der Rhön, Grand Duchy of Saxe-Weimar-Eisenach, German Empire
- Died: 12 April 1968 (aged 74); Bonn, North Rhine-Westphalia, West Germany
- Military career
- Allegiance: German Empire (to 1918); Weimar Republic (to 1933); Nazi Germany
- Branch: Imperial German Army; Freikorps; Reichswehr; Heer
- Service years: 1913–1945
- Rank: Generalleutnant
- Commands: 181. Infanterie-Division
- Conflicts: World War I World War II: Norwegian Campaign; Occupation of Yugoslavia; Belgrade Offensive; Courland Pocket
- Awards: Knight's Cross of the Iron Cross

Hermann Julius Fischer (19 February 1894 – 12 April 1968) was a German general in the Wehrmacht during World War II. He was a recipient of the Knight's Cross of the Iron Cross of Nazi Germany.

Fischer surrendered to the Red Army on 8 May 1945 in the Courland Pocket. Convicted as a war criminal at a show trial in the Soviet Union, he was held until 7 October 1955.

== Awards and decorations ==
- Iron Cross (1914)
  - 2nd Class (14 September 1914)
  - 1st Class (22 May 1918)
- Wound Badge (1914)
  - in Black (7 November 1918)
- Baltic Cross
  - 2nd Class
  - 1st Class
- Honour Cross of the World War 1914/1918 (14 February 1935)
- Wehrmacht Long Service Award 4th to 1st Class
- Iron Cross (1939)
  - 2nd Class (23 April 1940)
  - 1st Class (10 May 1940)
- Eastern Front Medal
- Order of the Cross of Liberty 2nd Class with Swords (10 February 1942)
- Knight's Cross of the Iron Cross on 9 May 1940 as Oberst and commander of Infanterie-Regiment 340
- Ärmelband Kurland

Military offices
Preceded by Generalleutnant Friedrich Bayer	Commander of 181. Infanterie-Division; 24 March 1942 – 1 October 1944	Succeeded by Generalleutnant Eugen-Heinrich Bleyer
