= Grabovo, Russia =

Grabovo (Russian: Грабово) is the name of several rural localities in Russia:

- Grabovo, Penza Oblast, a selo in Grabovsky Selsoviet of Bessonovsky District of Penza Oblast
- Grabovo, Pskov Oblast, a village in Bezhanitsky District of Pskov Oblast
