= Hrabove, Shatsk hromada, Volyn Oblast =

Hrabove Грабове
- Village
- Location within Volyn Oblast Location within Ukraine
- Coordinates: 51.4378°N 23.6989°E
- Country: Ukraine
- Oblast: Volyn Oblast
- Raion: Kovel Raion
- Hromada: Shatsk settlement hromada

Hrabove (Ukrainian: Грабове) is a village in Northwestern Ukraine, in Kovel Raion of Volyn Oblast, but was formerly administered within Shatsk Raion. The village is near the border between Ukraine and Poland.
