= Grahovo, Rožaje =

Grahovo Грахово
- Village
- Location within Montenegro
- Country: Montenegro
- Municipality: Rožaje

Population (2011)
  - Total: 295
- Time zone: UTC+1 (CET)
  - Summer (DST): UTC+2 (CEST)

Grahovo (Serbian Cyrillic: Грахово) is a village in the municipality of Rožaje, Montenegro.

== Demographics ==
According to the 2011 census, its population was 295.

Ethnicity in 2011
Ethnicity	Number	Percentage
Bosniaks	293	99.3%
other/undeclared	2	0.7%
Total	295	100%
