= Operation Ratweek =

In Occupied Europe during World War II, a co-ordinated assassination offensive against Nazi security forces, codenamed Ratweek, was mounted in January 1944 by the Special Operations Executive (SOE), with the intention of creating confusion and trepidation at the same time as the Allies increased preparations for the Resistance's contribution to the Normandy Landings. Full details have never been released, but it is known that "Ratweek" achieved successes against Nazi personnel and collaborators in Norway, France, Denmark, and the Netherlands. In 2000 it was revealed that the operation had been supervised by Hardy Amies, best known for his official title as dressmaker for Queen Elizabeth II, and at the time head of the SOE's Belgian Section.

Nigel West took the ethical implications of the assassination program RATWEEK as the example "to give any sensible historian second thoughts about chronicling these events".
