= Hrabove, Serekhovychi hromada, Volyn Oblast =

Hrabove Грабове
- Village
- Location within Volyn Oblast Location within Ukraine
- Coordinates: 51.403056°N 24.741944°E
- Country: Ukraine
- Oblast: Volyn Oblast
- Raion: Kovel Raion

Hrabove (Ukrainian: Грабове) is a village in northwestern Ukraine, in Stara Vyzhivka Hromada in Kovel Raion of Volyn Oblast, but was formerly administered within Stara Vyzhivka Raion. Its Zip Code is 44442.
