= 181st Infantry Division (Wehrmacht) =

- 181. Infanterie-Division
- Active: December 1939 – 8 May 1945
- Country: Nazi Germany
- Branch: Army
- Type: Infantry
- Size: Division
- Engagements: World War II: Invasion of Norway; Occupation of Yugoslavia; Belgrade Offensive

Commanders
- Notable commanders: Eugen-Heinrich Bleyer

The 181st Infantry Division (German: 181. Infanterie-Division) was a German division in World War II. It was formed on 1 December 1939. The division participated in anti-partisan operations in World War II in German-occupied Yugoslavia.

== Orders of Battle ==
=== 181. Infanterie-Division 1940 ===
- Infanterie-Regiment 334
- Infanterie-Regiment 349
- Infanterie-Regiment 359
- Artillerie-Regiment 222
- Pionier-Battalion 222
- Panzerjäger-Abteilung 222
- Infanterie-Divisions-Nachrichten-Abteilung 222
- Infanterie-Divisions-Nachschubführer 222

=== 181. Infanterie-Division 1943 ===
- Grenadier-Regiment 359
- Grenadier-Regiment 363
- Divisions-Füsilier-Battalion 181
- Artillerie-Regiment 222
- Pionier-Battalion 222
- Panzerjäger-Abteilung 222
- Infanterie-Divisions-Nachrichten-Abteilung 222
- Infanterie-Divisions-Nachschubführer 222

== Commanding officers ==
- Generalleutnant Peter Bielfeld, 1 December 1939 – 10 January 1940
- Generalleutnant Kurt Woytasch, 10 January 1940 – 1 March 1942
- Generalleutnant Friedrich Bayer, 1 March 1942 – 24 March 1942
- Generalleutnant Hermann Fischer, 24 March 1942 – 1 October 1944
- Generalleutnant Eugen Bleyer, 1 October 1944 – 8 May 1945
