= Velika, Montenegro =

Velika Велика
- Village
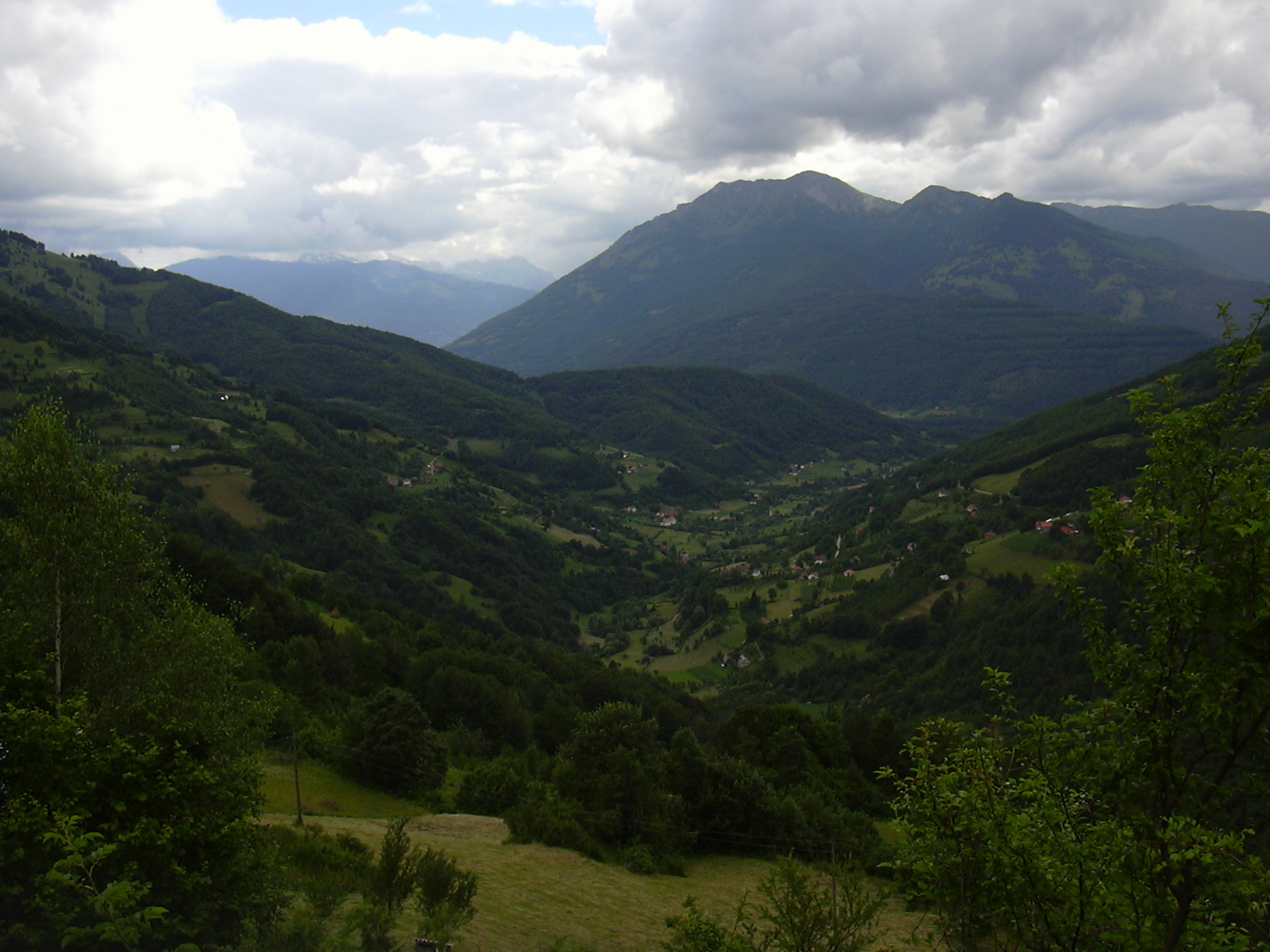
- View of Velika, Montenegro

- Location within Montenegro
- Country: Montenegro
- Municipality: Plav

Population (2011)
  - Total: 308
- Time zone: UTC+1 (CET)
  - Summer (DST): UTC+2 (CEST)

Velika (Serbian Cyrillic: Велика) is a village in the municipality of Plav, Montenegro, close to the village of Murino.

== History ==
In 1479, the Ottomans annexed Gornje Polimlje and Velika. Subsequently, these villages were organized into the Sanjak of Scutari. It was the site of several conflicts during the battles for Plav and Gusinje, between the Albanians under the League of Prizren and Montenegrin forces in 1879–80.

During World War II, on July 28, 1944, when the region was occupied by Germany, 428 Serbs and Montenegrins from the village, mostly women and children, were killed by the 21st Waffen Mountain Division of the SS Skanderbeg, which was composed predominantly of ethnic Albanians.

== Demographics ==
According to the 2011 census, its population was 308.

Ethnicity in 2011
Ethnicity	Number	Percentage
Serbs	228	74.0%
Montenegrins	65	21.1%
other/undeclared	15	4.9%
Total	308	100%
