= XXI Mountain Corps =

- Country: Germany
- 1943—44: Paul Bader
- 1 August 1944 — 29 April 1945: Ernst Von Leyser
- 29 April 1945 — 8 May 1945: Hartwig von Ludwiger

The XXI Mountain Corps was a German military formation in World War II.

At the beginning of November 1944 the XXI Mountain Corps retreated from Albania to Podgorica in Montenegro. In mid-November they tried to break through Danilovgrad and Nikšić toward Sarajevo, but Yugoslav partisan forces supported by two British artillery batteries, code-named Floydforce, stopped them after ten days fighting. At the end of November 1944 they had to retreat through a much longer route, via Kolašin, Prijepolje, and Višegrad.

== Commanders ==
- Paul Bader (25 August 1943 – 10 October 1943)
- Gustav Fehn (10 October 1943 – 20 July 1944)
- Ernst von Leyser (20 July 1944 – 29 April 1945)
- Hartwig von Ludwiger (29 April 1945 – 8 May 1945)

Hartwig von Ludwiger was put on the trial after World War II and hanged in 1947.

== Sources ==
- Pajović, Radoje (1977). Kontrarevolucija u Crnoj Gori: Četnički i federalistički pokret 1941–1945 (PDF) (in Serbo-Croatian). Cetinje, Yugoslavia: Obod.
- Mitcham Jr., Samuel W. (20 December 2006). Panzer Legions: A Guide to the German Army Tank Divisions of World War II and Their Commanders. Stackpole Books. ISBN 978-1-4617-5143-4.
- Mitcham, Samuel W. Jr. (2010). Blitzkrieg No Longer: The German Wehrmacht in Battle, 1943. Stackpole Books. ISBN 978-0-8117-0533-2.
