= List of Slovene Americans =

This is a list of notable Slovene Americans, including both original immigrants who obtained American citizenship and their American descendants.

To be included in this list, the person must have a Wikipedia article showing they are Slovene American or must have references showing they are Slovene American and are notable.

== List ==
=== Entertainment ===
==== Actors ====
- David Boreanaz – actor
- Ami Dolenz – actor
- George Dolenz – actor
- Micky Dolenz – actor, musician (drummer/singer of The Monkees)
- Frank Gorshin – actor
- Melissa Joan Hart – actress
- Željko Ivanek – Emmy Award-winning actor
- Lana Rhoades – actress
- Audrey Totter – actress
- Patrick Warburton – actor (his father is of Slovenian ancestry)

==== Comedy ====
- Anthony Jeselnik – comedian

==== Musicians ====
- Karen Kamensek – orchestral and operatic conductor
- Guy Klucevsek – accordionist and composer
- Emily Kokal – musician from rock band Warpaint
- Joey Miskulin – Grammy Award-winning musician and record producer
- Frankie Yankovic – Grammy Award-winning musician, known as "America's Polka King", popularized Slovenian-style polka
- "Weird Al" Yankovic – comedy performer known for his parodies of popular music

==== Sports ====
- Mike Adamle – American football player – Northwestern Wildcats and NFL – also a television and radio sports reporter and WWE wrestling announcer
- Tony Adamle – American football player – Ohio State Buckeyes and Cleveland Browns (member of 1950 and 1954 NFL Championship teams)
- Jeff Blatnick – Olympic champion in freestyle wrestling
- Frank Brimsek – ice hockey player
- Luka Dončić – Basketball player
- Bryant Dunston – professional basketball player for the Slovenian national team since he acquired Slovenian citizenship in 2015
- Bob Golic – American football player (Notre Dame Fighting Irish and NFL – Cleveland Browns, among other teams) – also an actor Saved by the Bell: The College Years
- Mike Golic – American football player (Notre Dame Fighting Irish and NFL – Philadelphia Eagles, among other teams) – also ESPN radio personality and host on Mike and Mike in the Morning
- Randy Gradishar – American football player (Ohio State Buckeyes and Denver Broncos)
- John Gruden – ice hockey player
- Eric Heiden – Olympic speed skater, winner of five gold medals at the 1980 Winter Olympics
- Luke Hochevar – Major League Baseball pitcher
- Frank Hribar – NFL Washington Redskins
- Wally Judnich – baseball player
- Joe Kuhel – baseball player and manager
- Les Kuntar – ice hockey player
- Sepp Kuss – professional cyclist
- Trajan Langdon – basketball (NBA and Europe) player
- Dan Majerle – basketball (NBA) player
- Ariel McDonald – former basketball player who played for the Slovenian national team in 2001 since he acquired citizenship, 2000 Israeli Basketball Premier League MVP
- Ken Novak – American football player
- Anton Peterlin – soccer player
- Anthony Randolph – basketball (NBA and Europe) player
- Peter Vidmar – gymnast, U.S. team captain and winner of two gold medals and a silver medal in the 1984 Olympics, was the highest scoring gymnast in U.S. history (with a 9.89 average)
- Fritzie Zivic – boxer
- Mark Zupan – athlete, wheelchair rugby team captain

=== Journalists ===
- Jim Klobuchar – author and journalist
- Charles Kuralt – journalist

=== Academic and scientific ===
- Richard Carl Fuisz – inventor
- Rado Lenček – linguist, ethnologist, cultural historian
- Jerry Michael Linenger – astronaut
- Ronald Sega – astronaut
- Joseph Velikonja – professor of geography
- Sunita Williams – astronaut

=== Military ===
- Ferdinand J. Chesarek – general
- Frank Gorenc – general
- Stanley Gorenc – general
- Joshua S. Kunch – major
- John S. Lekson – United States Army major general
- Rudolf Perhinek – captain
- Ronald Zlatoper – admiral

=== Politicians ===
- John Blatnik – U.S. Representative from Minnesota
- Joe Cimperman – Cleveland, Ohio city councilman and 2008 candidate for U.S. Representative
- Dennis E. Eckart – public and cultural worker; U.S. Representative from Ohio
- Paul Gosar – U.S. Representative from Arizona
- Tom Harkin – U.S. Senator from Iowa
- Amy Klobuchar – U.S. Senator from Minnesota
- Ray Kogovsek – U.S. Representative from Colorado
- Frank Lausche – Mayor of Cleveland, Ohio, U.S. Senator and Governor of Ohio
- Jim Oberstar – U.S. Representative from Minnesota
- Philip Ruppe – U.S. Representative from Michigan
- Joseph Stodola – Mayor of Little Rock, AR
- Ron Suster – Ohio State Representative and judge
- George Voinovich – Mayor of Cleveland, Ohio, U.S. Senator and Governor of Ohio
- Cheri Yecke – politician, academic

=== Religious ===
- Friderik Irenej Baraga (Frederic Baraga) – Roman Catholic Bishop and Missionary
- Elden Francis Curtiss – former Roman Catholic Archbishop of Omaha, Nebraska and former Bishop of Helena, Montana
- Antonija Höffern – missionary and educator
- Ignatius Mrak – Roman Catholic bishop
- Francis Xavier Pierz – Roman Catholic bishop

=== Writers ===
- Louis Adamič – author
- Tea Obreht – author
- Rose Mary Prosen – poet
- Michael Vouri - historian

=== Others ===
- Joe Kenda – detective lieutenant and TV producer
- Santino William Legan – perpetrator of the Gilroy Garlic Festival shooting on July 28, 2019
- Joe Sutter – manager of the design team for the Boeing 747
- Melania Trump – First Lady of the United States, wife of 45th and 47th U.S. President Donald Trump, mother of Barron Trump and former fashion model.
- Barron Trump — American student, son of 45th & 47th U.S President Donald Trump and Melania Trump
