= Rudolf Perhinek =

Yugoslav military officer

- Born: 23 June 1906; Vipavski Križ, Austria-Hungary (modern-day Slovenia)
- Died: 5 August 1982 (aged 76); Cleveland, Ohio, United States
- Burial place: Chardon cemetery
- Military career
- Allegiance: Yugoslavia (−1941); Chetniks (1941–1944); Italy (1942–1943); Germany (1943–1944) (Schutzstaffel) Gestapo (speculations?); Belgium
- Rank: Captain Kingdom of Yugoslavia; Major Chetniks; Lieutenant colonel Belgian army
- Nickname: Rudi
- Conflicts: World War II in Yugoslavia: Uprising in Montenegro; Operation Balkanschlucht
- Awards: Order of the Star of Karađorđe

Rudolf Perhinek (pseudonym Rade Perišin; or čiča Rade 23 June 1906 – 5 August 1982) was Yugoslav military officer with the rank of Captain in the Royal Yugoslav Army who, soon after the Axis invasion of Yugoslavia, joined Chetniks of Draža Mihailović. He was a member of the Supreme Command of Mihailović's Chetniks and received the rank of Major. Perhinek, also referred as Mihailović's right hand, organized Chetniks in Montenegro at the end of 1941. In period October 1941 — September 1943 he was a special envoy of Mihailovic's Chetnik staff for Montenegro who was also responsible for the intelligence service in Montenegro and Albania. Some sources describe him as an agent of Gestapo. For some time he was the Chief of Staff of Chetnik forces under command of Vojislav Lukačević. Perhinek was an ethnic Slovene. Yugoslav Government in Exile awarded him with Order of the Star of Karađorđe.

== Before the Second World War ==
Perhinek was born on 23 June 1906 in Vipavski Križ, Austria Hungary (modern day Slovenia). His father Karel was a chief of the station. His mother's name was Karmen. Perhinek completed elementary school in Vipavski Križ and high school in Novo Mesto where his father was transferred during the First World War. He graduated from the Belgrade Military Academy. As military officer he served in infantry military units in different garrisons in Yugoslavia.

Perhinek was a military adviser and one of the closest associates of Draža Mihailović when he was a commander of the 39th Infantry Regiment in Celje, modern day Slovenia. He was sentenced to 30 days of prison by the decision of Army Minister Milan Nedić because "he had intention to mislead the supreme military command to make wrong decisions".

== World War II ==
=== Beginning of the World War II in Yugoslavia ===
Perhinek was one of former military officers of the Royal Yugoslav Army who lived in Berane. He was a chief of staff of Kom detachment in Berane which was to invade Albania in case of Axis invasion of Yugoslavia. When Axis forces began with invasion of Yugoslavia his forces began with invasion of Albania until an order to withdraw prevented further penetration into territory of Albania. In June 1941 Perhinek organized a conference of the former military officers of the Yugoslav Army in Berane, including Cemović and Joksimović. During the Uprising in Montenegro he participated in the capture of Italian-held Berane.

=== Mihailović's instructions ===
Based on the instructions of the representatives of civic political parties from Berane received in September 1941, Perhinek and Lieutenant Mirko Kuklić made a successful journey to Mihailović's headquarter on Ravna Gora in the first half of October 1941. They informed Mihailović about the situation in Montenegro. On 15 October, Mihailović gave them instructions for the establishment of the Chetnik command structure in Montenegro.

According to historian Radoje Pajović, Mihailović invited Pavle Đurišić to his headquarter through Perhinek. Perhinek and Kuklić wrote an invitation to Đurišić dated 29 November 1941. Pajović explained that Perhinek and Kukić reached Sandžak village Dragojlovići on 8 December and invited Đurišić to come to this village with help of Milivoje Obradović, a commander of Rasovsko-Bistrički Chetnik detachment. Pajović also explains that, upon Đurišić's arrival to Dragojlovići, he was instructed to go to the Chetnik headquarter of Draža Mihailović which he did about ten days later to receive another set of Mihailović's instructions on 20 December 1941.

During his trial, Mihailović stated that in 1943 Perhinek emphasized that he and Đurišić forged Mihailović′s signature on the "instructions".

=== In Montenegro ===
Perhinek, then Captain, was a member of the staff of the Lim-Sandžak Chetnik Detachment. Perhinek was part of Chetnik delegation that was sent to Milan Nedić on May 18, 1942. to demand more weapons, to convince Germans in 'complete loyalty', s they wouldn't and Nedić that Chetnik operations against Yugoslav Partisans in districts of Bijelo Polje, Mileševa and Pljevlja was necessary.

On 15 September 1942 Perhinek attended the conference of the commanders of corps, brigades and districts from the territory under control of the Lim-Sandžak Chetnik Detachment held in Kolašin. For this conference Đurišić prepared an agenda, based on Mihailovićs instructions. In this agenda Đurišić emphasized that "the only law and order and the only policy and government is Chetnik organization". After this conference the Chetnik commanders organized similar conferences with officers subordinated to them and undertook planned measures. In October 1942, "Green" member of collaborationist committee Vojislav Nenadić tried to replace Chetnik president Blažo Đukanović. While he got majority against Đukanović in the committee, Draža Mihailović and Pavle Đurišić convinced Governor of Montenegro Alessandro Pirzio Biroli not to dismiss. Perhinek, as Chetnik High Quarters delegate for Montenegro, took political action against Nenadić to get him dismissed from position in the committee. These actions were unsuccessful.

As an envoy of Chetnik supreme command, Perhinek participated at the so-called Second Youth Conference held on 4 December 1942 in Šahovići, Montenegro. Perhinek presided the conference, together with Pavle Đurišić and Radomir Popović. Perhinek was a man of the greatest confidence of Mihailović and was relatively unknown among the people in the narrow circle around Đurišić. Based on instructions of Draža Mihailović, Perhinek established the communication with Balli Kombëtar and leader of Albanian Catholics of northern Albania. According to Perhinek, Prek Cali was politically opposed to the Muslims from Kosovo and Perhinek openly admitted that he used Cali to inspire conflicts between Catholics and Muslims in northern Albania.

In the middle of May 1943, prior to the formal commencement of Operation Schwarz and in its initial phases, around 2,000 men from Lim-Sandžak Chetnik Detachment (LSCD), including Đurišić, were captured by German forces. Perhinek was in charge of reorganisation of LSCD, however despite his enthusiasm for this role, he was rather incompetent. During the next couple of weeks the Italians disarmed majority of Chetniks in Montenegro, captured and interned to prison in Italy big number of Chetnik commanders, including many from the staff of LSCD. Initially, Đorđije Lašić gathered scattered groups of Chetniks on the territory that was under Đurišić's control. Lašić and Đurišić were in conflict earlier and Đurišić's former associates did not trust him. With the approval of Perhinek, they recreated Chetnik organisation and new staff of LSCD and proposed Mihailović to appoint Lukačević as their commander. Mihailović accepted this proposal and Vojislav Lukačević succeeded Đurišić as the commander of the remaining men of the detachment and, accompanied by Perhinek, came to Berane on 14 July 1943. Perhinek and Mihailović maintained continuous communication through radiotelegraphy.

When Allies invaded Sicily in July 1943 Mihailović expected Allies to invade Balkans and in preparation for this, reorganized Chetniks in Montenegro. Perhinek kept his position of Mihailović's envoy for Montenegro who is also responsible for the intelligence service in Montenegro and Albania.

Before the capitulation of Italy, Mihailović removed Perhinek from the position of envoy of the Chetnik staff because he did not resolve the personal animosity between Lukačević and Lašić. The Chetnik staff considered Perhinek not suitable for this position. Perhinek was also afraid that Lukačević and Lašić might decide to kill him. Savo Vukadinović was appointed to Perhinek's former position.

On 14 September 1943 Lukačević, Colonel Bailey and Perhinek arrived to Berane to disarm Italian Division Venezia. Together with Lašić and Vukadinović they negotiated with the Italian General Oxilia who was willing to join Chetniks and to fight against communists and Germans. Eventually Division Venezia joined Partisans who managed to capture Berane and gain significant advantage toward Chetniks in eastern Montenegro. In order to destroy Division Venezia and adjacent Partisan forces, the German forces started Operation Balkanschlucht and invaded eastern Montenegro. This operation was beneficial for Chetniks who were on the verge of annihilation. Perhinek was responsible to establish communication between invading German forces and Lašić.

=== Move to Serbia and capture ===
In November 1943, after the failure of the Operation Balkanschlucht, around 300 Chetniks from Berane and Andrijevica led also by Perhinek retreated from Montenegro to mountains Javor and Golija in Serbia. There they joined Lukačević and his 1,000 Chetniks. Milan Nedić sent to Nova Varoš some of his units to support Chetniks from Sandžak and Montenegro, but they were prevented by the Germans to continue their advance.

On 3 March 1944 Perhinek was arrested by the Germans because in some of documents he signed, Germans and Sandžak Muslim militia were defined as enemies.

== After the Second World War ==
The Germans transported Perhinek to the prison in Germany where he stayed until the end of the war. He intended to return to Yugoslavia to help Mihailović, but British officers were opposed to it so he moved to Belgium where he was accepted in the Belgian Army with the rank of Lieutenant Colonel until 1950 when he moved to USA. In 1951 he moved to Cleveland where he worked as an engineer for 10 years and another 15 years at municipal services. He was very active member of the Sokol movement. Perhinek died on 5 August 1982 in Cleveland and was buried at the Chardon cemetery.

== Sources ==
- Tomasevich, Jozo (1975). War and Revolution in Yugoslavia, 1941–1945: The Chetniks. Stanford, California: Stanford University Press. ISBN 978-0-8047-0857-9.
- Pajović, Radoje (1977). Kontrarevolucija u Crnoj Gori: četnički i federalistički pokret 1941-1945.
- Pajović, Radoje (1987). Pavle Đurišić (in Serbo-Croatian). Zagreb, Yugoslavia: Centar za informacije i publicitet. ISBN 978-86-7125-006-1.
- Živković, Milutin D. (2017). Санџак 1941–1943 [Sandžak 1941–1943] (Doctoral) (in Serbo-Croatian). Belgrade: University of Belgrade. OCLC 1242119546.
