= Milutin Jelić =

- Born: Милутин Јелић
- Died: 19 June 1942; Zlatar, modern-day Serbia
- Known for: Yugoslav politician known for being one of main organizers of Chetnik rebels in Vasojevići during the World War II and a head of delegation of rebels who negotiated agreement with Italian forces in mid-August 1941 during the Uprising in Montenegro

Milutin Jelić (?—19 June 1942) was a Yugoslav professor of philosophy and member of parliament known for being one of main organizers of Chetnik rebels in Vasojevići Montenegrin tribe and a head of delegation of rebels who negotiated peace with Italian forces in mid-August 1941 during the Uprising in Montenegro.

== Biography ==
Jelić was a professor of philosophy and director of Podgorica Gymnasium before the World War II and member of parliament and member of the Radical Party.

Jelić was among main organizers of gathering of 2-300 pro-Chetnik people in village Kralji. Because of the obstruction of local communists they were not able to establish Chetnik military units until several days later when Jelić again gathered people and read the order of Pavle Đurišić to establish Andrijevica Chetnik Detachment.

According to Batrić Jovanović Jelić summoned local population to gather on 16 July 1941 in forest Dubovik, Slatina, near Andrijevica. Jelić also attended some conferences held by communists between 22 and 26 July and blamed communists for "tragedy of the people" and publicly opposed their leaders.

In the middle of August on the part of the front toward Rožaje commanded by Pavle Đurišić and toward Čakor commanded by Đorđije Lašić the rebel representatives and Italian forces organized negotiations. The delegation of rebels was headed by Jelić who negotiated agreement with Italian forces. The rebel requests were the following:

1. The rebels would organize new uprising in case of an attempt of Italian government to proclaim Montenegro as independent state
2. The Albanians and Albanian military will be banned from entering the territory under rebel control and urgent stop of torching the Serb villages. In return the rebels would release prisoners they took during the uprising
3. Italian troops will be considered as enemy troops until the end of war.

The Italian side accepted parts of the rebel demands by agreeing to stop torching villages and by retreating Albanian forces, while rebels obliged themselves to allow Italians to re-occupy towns captured by rebels during the uprising.

Batrić Jovanović also emphasizes that Jelić attended a conference in Cetinje organized in mid-autumn 1941 by Rulli, who was a deputy of Pirzio Birolli. The post-war communist sources emphasized that Jelić was one of two main traitors in two counties in Montenegro. According to Vladimir Dedijer, Jelić belonged to people who invested significant efforts to connect Chetniks in Montenegro with Chetniks from Serbia.

During the period of communist terror (known as Leftist errors) the communists put Jelić on the list of their enemies who should be executed. The post-war communist published source elaborated how some Communists were excluded from party membership while Communist party cell in Slatina was disbanded because of obstruction of execution of Jelić and some other people that Communists considered as enemies. Eventually, the communists succeeded to kill Jelić when, according to Dedijer, Zlatar guerrilla brigade killed him on 19 June 1942, when he traveled to Belgrade after being invited by Milan Nedić.

== Sources ==
- Jovanović, Batrić (1960). Crna Gora u narodnooslobodilačkom ratu i socijalističkoj revoluciji. Vojno delo.
- Dedijer, Vladimir (1970). Od 28 novembra 1942 do 10 novembra 1943. Prosveta.
- Dedijer, Vladimir (1990). The War Diaries of Vladimir Dedijer: From April 6, 1941, to November 27, 1942. University of Michigan Press. ISBN 9780472101092.
- Milovanović, Nikola B. (1984). Kontrarevolucionarni pokret Draže Mihailovića. Izdavačka radna organizacija "Rad".
- Lekić, Radovan (1961). Andrijevički srez, 1941-1944: prilog istoriji NOB Crne Gore. Obod.
