= Eastern Herzegovinian =

Dialect of Shtokavian supradialect of Serbo-Croatian language

- istočnohercegovački источнохерцеговачки
- Language family: Indo-European: Balto-Slavic; Slavic; South Slavic; Western; Shtokavian; Neo-Shtokavian; Eastern Herzegovinian

Language codes
- ISO 639-3: –
- Glottolog: east2821
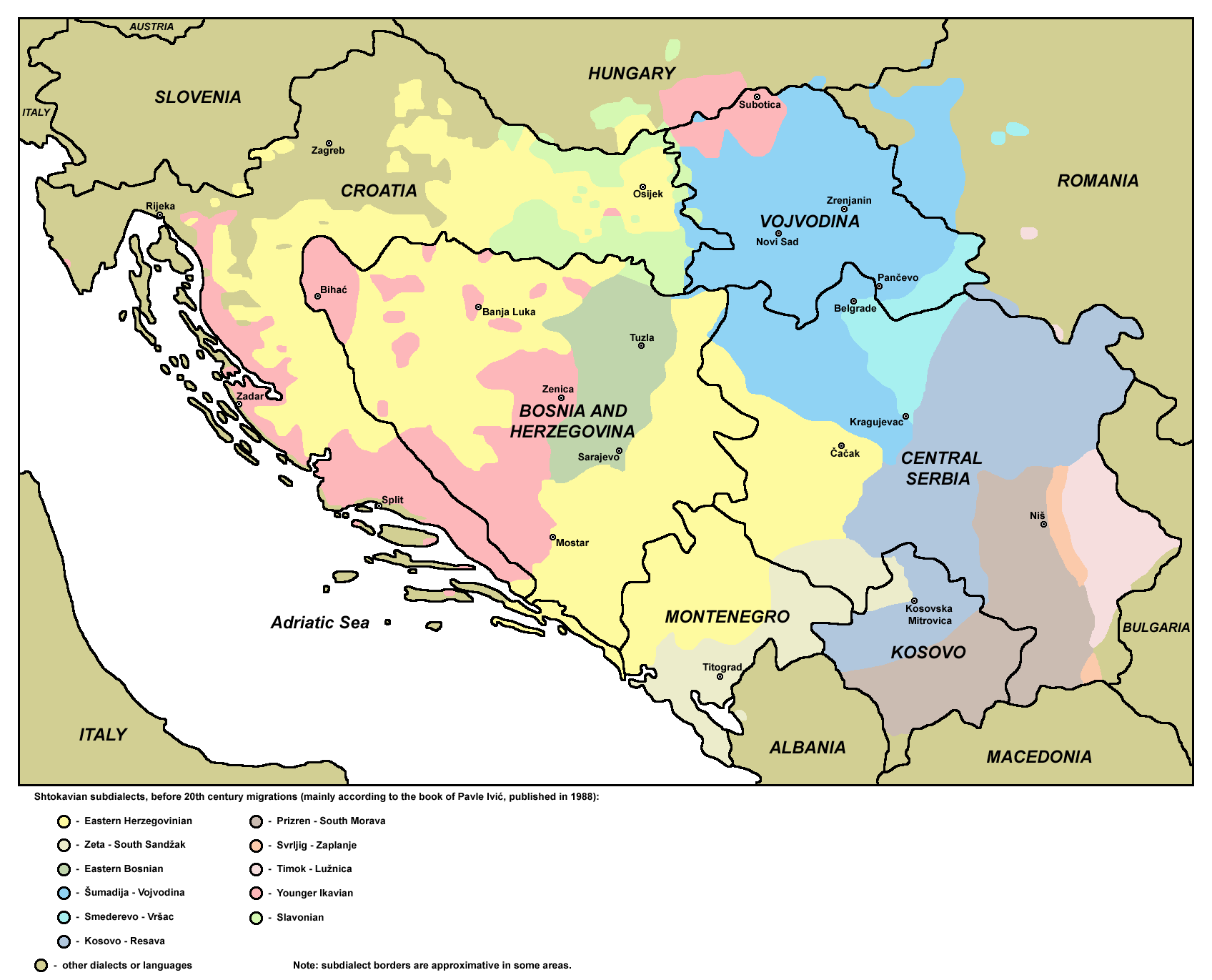
- Map of Shtokavian subdialects prior to the 20th-century migrations; Eastern Herzegovinian subdialect area shown in yellow

The Eastern Herzegovinian dialect (/ˌhɛərtsəɡəˈviːniən, ˌhɜːr-, -ɡoʊ-, -ˈvɪn-/, Serbo-Croatian: istočnohercegovački dijalekt / источнохерцеговачки дијалект) is a dialect of the Shtokavian supradialect of the Serbo-Croatian language, dominantly of Ijekavian pronunciation. It is the dialectal basis for all modern Serbo-Croatian standards: Bosnian, Croatian, Serbian, and Montenegrin.

== Geographical distribution ==
Eastern Herzegovinian covers large areas of Bosnia-Herzegovina, Croatia, Serbia, and Montenegro. It is composed of two larger zones that are territorially separated:

- Southeastern zone, where it originated from (eastern Herzegovina, southern Dalmatia, western Montenegro, western Serbia, eastern Bosnia)
- Northwestern zone (western Bosnia, northern Dalmatian Hinterland, Lika, parts of Slavonia and Baranja)

The southeastern zone is territorially compact and continuous, while the northwestern zone is broken, discontinuous and interspersed with areas where other Shtokavian dialects are spoken.

Being spoken on such a large area, Eastern Herzegovinian comes into contact with all of the other Shtokavian dialects, except those of the Prizren-Timok zone, and also on northwest with the dialects of two other Western South Slavic (Croatian) dialects: Chakavian and Kajkavian.

In the south this dialect covers the area between the river of Neretva and River Dubrovačka inlet, the area of Dubrovnik and Dubrovnikan littoral (with own Dubrovnik subdialect), eastern half of the Pelješac peninsula, the island of Mljet, Konavle and Herzegovinian area, along the Adriatic coast all the way to Risan in the Bay of Kotor. On the territory of modern-day Montenegro it covers Old Herzegovina with Grahovo, northern Pješivci, Župa, Lukovo, Drobnjaci, Uskoci, Rovci, Kolašin, and Morača.

During the Bosnian War (1992–95), marked by large-scale migrations of the native population, Eastern Herzegovinian spread significantly in the area of Bosnia-Herzegovina. During the Croatian War of Independence (1991–1995) however, the number of Eastern Herzegovinian speakers significantly dropped, following the flight of some 300,000 Croatian Serbs, all of whom spoke the dialect.
