= Tošković =

Tošković (Cyrillic: Тошковић or Тошкович) is a Montenegrin surname that may refer to the following notable people:

- Anđela Tošković (born 2004), Montenegrin football midfielder
- Jasna Tošković (born 1989), Montenegrin handball player
- Jovan Tošković (1893–1943), Montenegrin Serb historian, professor and politician
- Nikola Toshkovich (1831–1893), Bulgarian engineer
- Uroš Tošković (1932–2019), Montenegrin and Yugoslav painter and draftsman
- Vučeta Tošković (born 1941), politician in Serbia
