= Cetinje massacre =

1944 massacre in German occupied Macedonia

- Part of Yugoslavia in World War II
- Location: Cetinje, German occupied territory of Montenegro
- Date: 13 and 14 November 1944
- Attack type: Summary executions
- Deaths: 28
- Victim: citizens of Cetinje
- Perpetrator: Yugoslav Partisan forces (10th Montenegrin Strike Brigade commanded by Nikola Banović)

The Cetinje massacre was a massacre of 28 citizens of Cetinje in the German occupied territory of Montenegro (modern-day Montenegro) committed by the Communist-led Yugoslav Partisans on 13 and 14 November 1944. Since June 1941 hard-line elements of the Communist Party in Montenegro perceived the uprising against the Axis occupiers as the first stage of a communist revolution, struggling against their perceived class enemies. The communist terror had turned a substantial part of population in Montenegro against the Communist-led forces.

The Partisans managed to defeat the Chetniks to gain control over the German-occupied territory of Montenegro in November 1944. Thousands of people from Montenegro, including many from Cetinje, tried to escape and retreated toward Slovenia together with Chetniks commanded by Pavle Đurišić, himself the perpetrator of multiple massacres of local Muslims. The only civilians that stayed in Cetinje in November 1944 were people who believed they had no reason to fear or hide from anybody. On 13 November 1944 the Partisans entered Cetinje and shot without any trial 28 citizens of Cetinje. The Partisans killed 14 people on both 13 and 14 November. They were all summarily executed at "New Cemetery" of Cetinje in Humci. Many of them were notable citizens like Ilija Zorić, a historian and director of Cetinje Lyceum (Gymnasium), director of the school in Cetinje with his wife, professor of physics and chemistry and his wife. The killings were not acknowledged in official historiography during the rule of the Communist Party in Yugoslavia.

== Background ==
The Communist forces from Montenegro belonged to some of the most rigid elements of the Tito's Partisans. Already in June 1941 the Regional Committee of CPY for Montenegro, Boka and Sandžak issued a proclamation inviting people to "final liquidation of capitalist system".

Despite instructions to minimize the revolutionary side of their policies, the leaders of Montenegrin Partisans introduced "Soviet elements" in the summer of 1941, during the uprising in Montenegro, because they perceived the uprising as the first stage of the communist revolution. On 27 July 1941 the Communist command for Montenegro issued an order for establishment of courts-martial aimed against those who they perceived as a fifth column, ending their order with proclamation "Patriots, destroy the fifth column and victory is ours!". The frequent killings under the Leftist errors policy began in Montenegro since August 1941 while its intensity was increased since September 1941. The Partisans occupied Kolašin in January and February 1942, and turned against all real and potential opposition, killing about 300 people and throwing their mangled corpses into pits they called the "dogs' cemetery". Due to this and other examples of communist terror, a part of Montenegrin population turned against the Partisans. According to Zbornik za istoriju, "[a] land without Chetniks was suddenly overwhelmed by Chetniks", largely due to the policies of Left Deviations.

After the initial success of the uprising in Montenegro, the Partisans seized control of almost all the territory of the Italian governorate of Montenegro and began to fight against their class enemies. The substantial percentage of population of Montenegro supported the Chetniks because they were afraid of the "red terror". In late summer of 1942 Italian forces launched an offensive against the Partisans who fled to Bosnia, which gave the Chetniks the opportunity to start a regime in which terror against the people of Montenegro started as revenge for their earlier uprising. Until late 1944 the Communists occupied most of Montenegro.

== Massacre ==
Many people who lived in Cetinje decided not to wait for the Communists to enter the town and left with Chetniks commanded by Pavle Đurišić on 12 November 1944, a day before the Communists entered the town. The communists used gun and mortar fire to constantly attack both Chetniks and civilians while they retreated toward Podgorica where masses of people gathered to escape the red terror. The only civilians that stayed in the town in November 1944 were people who believed they have no reason to fear or hide from anybody. The Communist forces that entered Cetinje belonged to 10th Montenegrin Strike Brigade. As soon as Communists captured Cetinje, in the night of 13 November 1944, they shot without any trial dozens of Cetinje citizens. They were all summarily executed at "New Cemetery" of Cetinje in Humci. The Communists first killed 14 people on 13 November and another 14 on 14 November 1944. The second group of civilians was executed at the same location as the first group, also without any trial or conviction. After the massacres, Communists published a poster in which they proclaimed that all executed citizens of Cetinje were sentenced to death because of collaboration with occupiers. The names of communists who ordered and who performed the executions remained unknown.

The most notable victim of Communists in Partisan occupied Cetinje was Ilija Zorić, a historian and director of Cetinje Lyceum (Gymnasium) also known for his work for the Cetinje Theater. Zorić was murdered on the second night of the massacre, while the list of people murdered on the first night of massacre includes Joko Grujičić who was director of the school in Cetinje and his wife Milosava, Dr Jovan I Petrović-Njegoš who was a professor of physics and chemistry and his wife Mileva. The list of victims also includes former major of Cetinje, Tomo Milošević, who was murdered although he was performing his official duties only during the period of the Kingdom of Yugoslavia, not during the occupation.

== Aftermath ==
Cetinje was not the only place where Communists committed massacres in 1944 in Montenegro. In 2019, 75 years after mass murder of citizens of Cetinje committed without any trial or sentence, the only reminder of this massacre are broken crosses on unmarked graves on Cetinje Cemetery with remnants of murdered people. The communist mass murder of citizens of Cetinje was a taboo for the official historiography during the rule of the communist regime in Yugoslavia. The historian Vukić emphasized that all victims were executed without any trial, although the poster with names of executed people was hung on all public places in Cetinje stating that victims were murdered because of the collaboration with occupying Axis forces. No public person from Montenegrin military or political establishment has ever condemned the massacre committed by communists, except People's Hero of Yugoslavia General Colonel Blažo Janković who admitted that the "explanation" for the murder of a group of professors in Cetinje is that they were killed by their former bad students.

== Sources ==
- Fleming, Thomas (2002). Montenegro: The Divided Land. Chronicles Press. ISBN 978-0-9619364-9-5.
- Vujović, Mišo (2003). Crnja i Gora. Nova Pazova. ISBN 9788650301838.
- Strugar, Vlado (1997). Drugi svjetski rat—50 godina kasnije: radovi sa naučnog skupa, Podgorica, 20–22. septembar 1996. Crnogorska akademija nauka i umjetnosti. ISBN 978-86-7215-089-6.
- Haug, Hilde Katrine (2012). Creating a Socialist Yugoslavia: Tito, Communist Leadership and the National Question. I.B.Tauris. ISBN 978-0-85773-100-5.
- Димитријевић, Бојан (2019). Голгота Четника (in Serbian). Вукотић Медиа доо. ISBN 978-86-89613-99-5.
