= Tobia Lionelli =

Slovene–Italian preacher and writer

Tobia Lionelli (1647 – 17 October 1714) was a Slovene–Italian preacher and writer in the Baroque period. His sermons had a crucial role in the affirmation of Slovene as a language. He is also known by his monastic name John Baptist of Sveti Križ in Vipava (Latin: Joannes Baptista à Sancta Cruce Vippacensi; later Slovenized as Janez (Krstnik) Svetokriški, Janez Krstnik od svetega Križa, or Ivan Krstnik od Križa).

Sacrum promptuarium, vol. 1

== Life ==
Lionelli was born to a Slovene mother and an Italian father in the town of Sveti Križ (now Vipavski Križ) in the Vipava Valley, County of Gorizia. A recent theory conjectures that he was actually born as Ivan Hrobat, the illegitimate son of Katarina Hrobat and a nobleman of the Lanthieri family, and that the surname Lionelli was purchased to avoid embarrassment.

He took the name "Joannes Baptista à Sancta Cruce Vippacensi" upon joining the Order of Friars Minor Capuchin in reference to his native town and probably also to the Spanish mystic St. John of the Cross. He served in various monasteries in the Slovene Lands, including the Capuchin monastery of St. Francis Assisi in his native town, and in Croatia. Lionelli died in Gorizia, where he had spent the last years of his life.

== Work ==
Lionelli wrote over 230 sermons, which he published in a series of five books entitled Sacrum promptuarium (The Holy Handbook). One of his best-known sermons is Na noviga lejta dan (On New Year's Day). The publication of these books was financed by members of the nobility and benefactors from within the Church.

Lionelli's Sacrum promptuarium was published between 1691 and 1707. The first two volumes were published in Venice, the remaining three in Ljubljana. They are written in the Brda dialect of Slovene, with strong influence of the neighbouring Inner Carniolan dialect, with numerous Germanisms and Latin quotations. The syntax presents a typical Baroque style, with references to Classical tradition.
