= Jovan Tošković =

Jovan Tošković (Serbian Cyrillic: Јован Тошковић; 1893 – 21 October 1943) was a Montenegrin Serb historian, professor and politician.

Born to a merchant family in Plana, Principality of Montenegro, Jovan finished his primary education in the town of Kolašin and later moved to Belgrade under the guidance of his uncle, an envoy of King Nikola. He graduated from the University of Belgrade's newly created Faculty of Philosophy, and having published his doctoral thesis he became the first post-war professor of Serbian history at the university.

Having been a staunch supporter of the Yugoslav monarchy, he joined the Chetnik movement in 1941 and subsequently relocated to Montenegro. There, he served as an advisor to Blažo Đukanović and worked within the various ministries of the Italian governorate of Montenegro with the hope of establishing a foothold for the monarchist forces in the region. He also served as an emissary for Draža Mihailović. On October 19, 1943, he was captured and shot by the Yugoslav Partisans at the Chetnik headquarters in the Ostrog Monastery along with 25 other Chetniks.
