= Radulović =

Surname

Radulović (Serbian: Радуловић), Radulovich is a Serbo-Croatian surname, derived from the male given name Radul or Radule. Notable people with the surname include:

- Barbara Radulović (born 1982), Croatian TV host
- Bojana Radulović (born 1973), Hungarian former handball player
- Branko Radulović (1881–1916), Bosnian-born Serbian painter
- Dragan Radulović (born 1969), Montenegrin writer, literary reviewer and essayist
- Jovan Radulović (1951–2018), Serbian writer
- Milan Radulović (1948–2017), Serbian Minister of Religion
- Milan Radulović (footballer) (born 1981), Montenegrin footballer
- Milo Radulovich (1926–2007), American Air Force lieutenant
- Mileta Radulović (born 1981), Montenegrin football goalkeeper
- Miodrag Radulović (born 1967), Montenegrin football manager and former player
- Miroslav Radulović (born 1984), Slovenian footballer
- Nemanja Radulović (born 1985), Franco-Serbian violinist
- Nenad Radulović (1959–1990), Serbian rock musician
- Nikola Radulović (born 1973), Italian basketball player and Olympic silver medallist
- Niccolò Radulovich (1627–1702), a Roman Catholic cardinal
- Nina Radulović (born 1986), Serbian television presenter
- Radoslav Radulović (born 1972), professional Bosnian Serb football player
- Saša Novak Radulović (born 1964), Croatian guitarist
- Sasa Radulovic (architect), award-winning Canadian architect
- Sasa Radulovic (born 1978), Bosnian-Australian footballer
- Saša Radulović (born 1965), Serbian politician and Canadian businessman
- Savo Radulović (1911–1991), Serbian American painter
- Zdravko Radulović (born 1966), retired Montenegrin-born Croatian basketball player

== See also ==
- Radulov, variant
- Raduljica
