= Skanderbeg (military unit) =

- Allegiance: Albania
- Branch: Royal Italian Army
- Size: 4 battalions
- Part of: XIV Army Corps
- Engagements: World War II in Yugoslavia: Uprising in Montenegro

Skanderbeg was an Albanian military unit assigned to the 14th Italian Army Corps, composed of Albanian soldiers recruited in Albania during the Second World War. This unit participated in the Italian counteroffensive against insurgents in Montenegro, during the Uprising in Montenegro in 1941. Skanderbeg was composed of four battalions and had the strength of one division or two regiments.

== Uprising in Montenegro ==
During the Italian offensive this military unit operated on the territory between Skadar Lake, Bar and Ulcinj. On 15 July 1941, two days after the outbreak of the uprising, the supreme command of Italian forces in Albania decided to support Italian forces in Montenegro by moving Skanderbeg to Ulcinj. On 17 July Biroli ordered Skanderbeg to seize area on the border between Albania and Montenegro, without crossing it. On 22 July Skanderbeg participated in cleansing action in Mikulići, near Bar.

The first military engagement of this unit was on 4 August 1941 in the area assigned to Division Venezia. Skanderbeg was engaged as vanguard of Italian divisions.

After the suppression of the uprising, Skanderbeg was assigned to 9th Army, together with several military units that initially belonged to the 14th Army Corps.
