= Đorđije Lašić =

Montenegrin Serb military officer

- Ђорђије Лашић
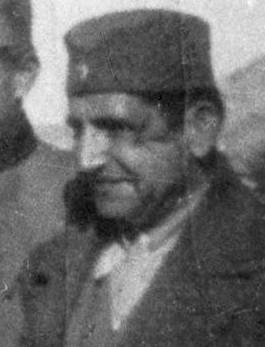
- Lašić in 1944
- Born: 5 May 1906; Andrijevica, Principality of Montenegro
- Died: 5 May 1944 (aged 38); Podgorica, Montenegro
- Military career
- Allegiance: Yugoslavia (1918–41); Yugoslav Partisans (1941); Chetniks (1941–44); Italy (1942–43); Germany (1943–44)
- Service years: 1924–43
- Rank: Major
- Conflicts: World War II in Yugoslavia: Uprising in Montenegro

Đorđije Lašić (Serbian Cyrillic: Ђорђије Лашић; 5 May 1906 – 5 May 1944) was a Montenegrin Serb military officer of the Royal Yugoslav Army. During the Second World War he participated in the 1941 Uprising in Montenegro, but soon turned to collaboration with Axis occupation forces until he was killed during the bombing of Podgorica in 1944.

== Early life ==
Lašić was born in village of Kami near Andrijevica, Principality of Montenegro. He completed his primary education in Lijeva Rijeka. He started his secondary education in Berane Gymnasium, but due to his bad financial situation, he left school in 1918 and enrolled in military school in Ćuprija which he completed in 1922.

== World War II ==
=== Uprising in Montenegro ===
At the beginning of June 1941, Lašić met with the other officers of Royal Yugoslav Army to discuss potential actions against the occupying Axis forces in Montenegro. The insurgent forces were mostly led by former officers of the Kingdom of Yugoslavia until the end of October 1941. However, during preparation for uprising in Montenegro, the Communist Party of Yugoslavia came in touch with active and reserve officers of the former Royal Yugoslav Army, because there were many young people in the ranks of the insurgents who did not know how to handle a firearm. Thus Lašić became a member of the Partisan Military Committee for Andrijevica. Later, when Axis Albanian units started to concentrate toward the liberated territory, Lašić was co-opted in the District Military Command.

Lašić often spoke out against the communist leadership of the uprising. The leadership itself had no illusions of prolonged cooperation with Lašić, but were trying not to aggravate relations with him until the Partisans liberated Plav and Gusinje. When the Royal Italian Army began its offensive against the Partisans on August 4, Lašić abandoned his position in the partisan District Military Command and joined the anti-communist group led by Ljubo Vuksanović, who opposed further struggle against Axis occupation. After the Partisan withdrawal from Berane and Andrijevica in early August, Lašić was chosen as a member of the delegation sent to meet the Royal Italian Army. On September 5 in Lijeva Rijeka, Lašić gathered people and called for combat against communist rebels.

After the initial major success, the uprising was suppressed within three weeks. Most nationalist commanders took neither side in the sporadic clashes between Italian forces and insurgent forces that became increasingly dominated by Partisans. On September 5, 1941, Lašić organized a gathering of the locals, where he expressed his loyalty to Italians, and threatened insurgent still "in the woods" with force if they don't give in; In mid-October, he went to Ravna Gora in Serbia to meet Chetnik leader Draža Mihailović, who appointed Lašić commander of Chetniks in Old Montenegro.

In November 1941, Lašić established the first Chetnik military organization in Lijeva Rijeka, and at the beginning of December, its first Chetnik battalion. He was the first commander of this battalion, the first of its kind in Montenegro.

=== After the uprising ===
In the second half of December 1941, Pavle Đurišić and Lašić began to establish and mobilize armed units separated from Partisans. By the middle of January 1942 these units were in armed conflict with Partisans. Lašić was heavily wounded when two companies of the Kom Partisan detachment attacked Chetniks in Bare Kraljske (near Kolašin); the command of Chetnik forces at this sector was transferred to Andrija Vesković as a result.

In October 1942, Lašić was part of delegation of Blažo Đukanović, president of a committee that collaborated with Italians, during Đukanović's visit to cities in Italian governorate of Montenegro.

On January 7, 1942, Lašić made a proclamation to the people of Montenegro to fight against the occupier and to take revenge against Muslims, openly calling for the "Extermination of the Turkicized" (so-called Istraga poturica). As a representative of the Montenegrin Chetniks, Lašić was present at a meeting of Chetnik commanders of Montenegro, Sandžak and Boka Kotorska in the village of Šahovići in November and December 1942. Historian Branko Petranović notes that Chetnik leaders from these regions have seemingly accepted Stevan Moljević's vision of a ethnically clean Serbia within Yugoslavia, as they decided that no one except Serbs, Croats and Slovenes can live inside the new Yugoslavia and that the fight against the enemies (mainly communists and Muslims) will be until extermination.

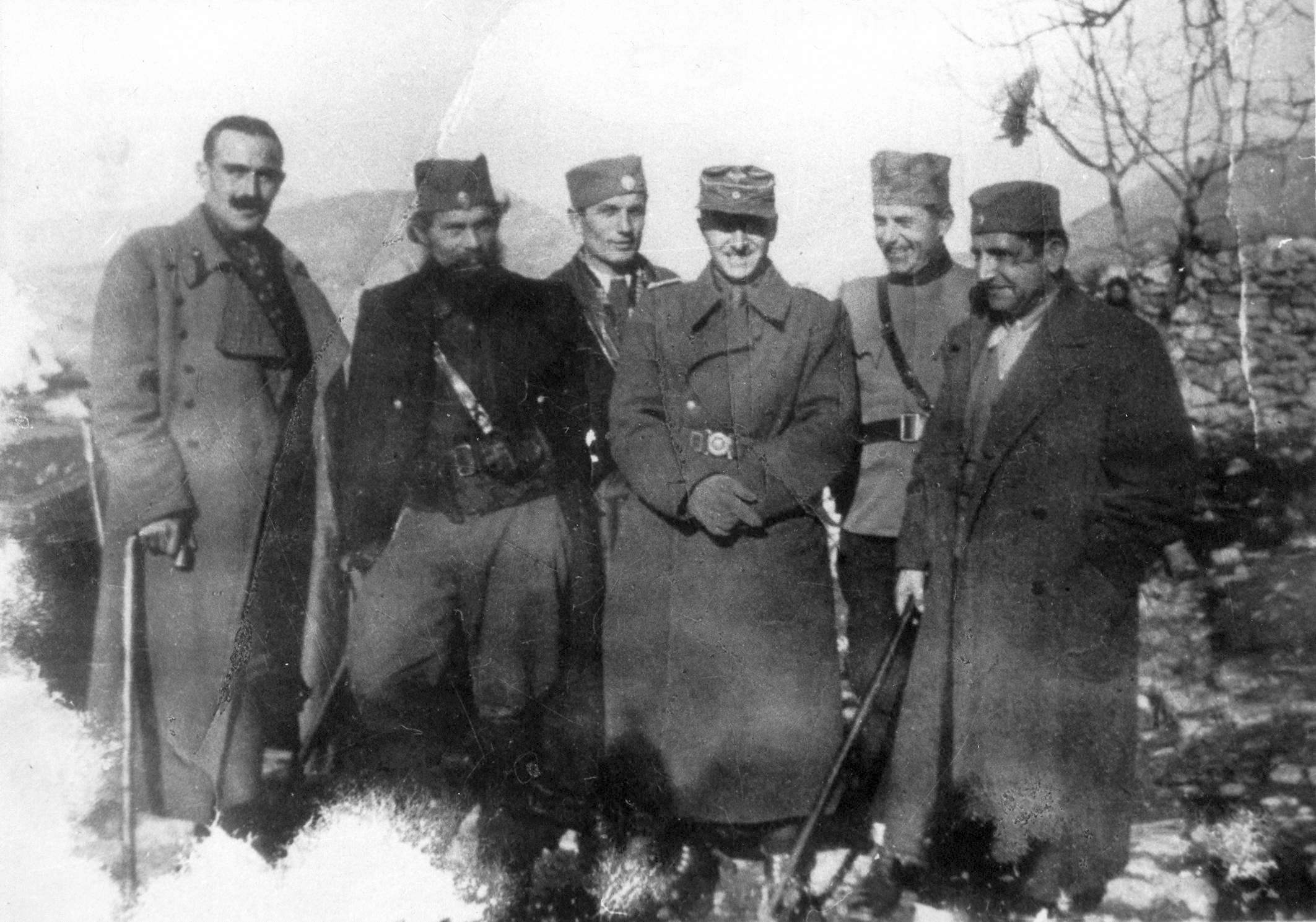
Chetnik commander Đorđije Lašić (first from right) with German officer and Chetniks in Podgorica 1944

In the period between German capture of Pavle Đurišić on 14 May 1943, during their Operation Schwarz, and Đurišić's return from German prison in November 1943, Lašić was the only remaining Chetnik commander in Montenegro. His forces were probably no more than 500 men.

Lašić was killed on May 5, 1944 during the bombing of Podgorica by the Allies.
