= Vipavski Križ =

Vipavski Križ Sveti Križ (until 1955)
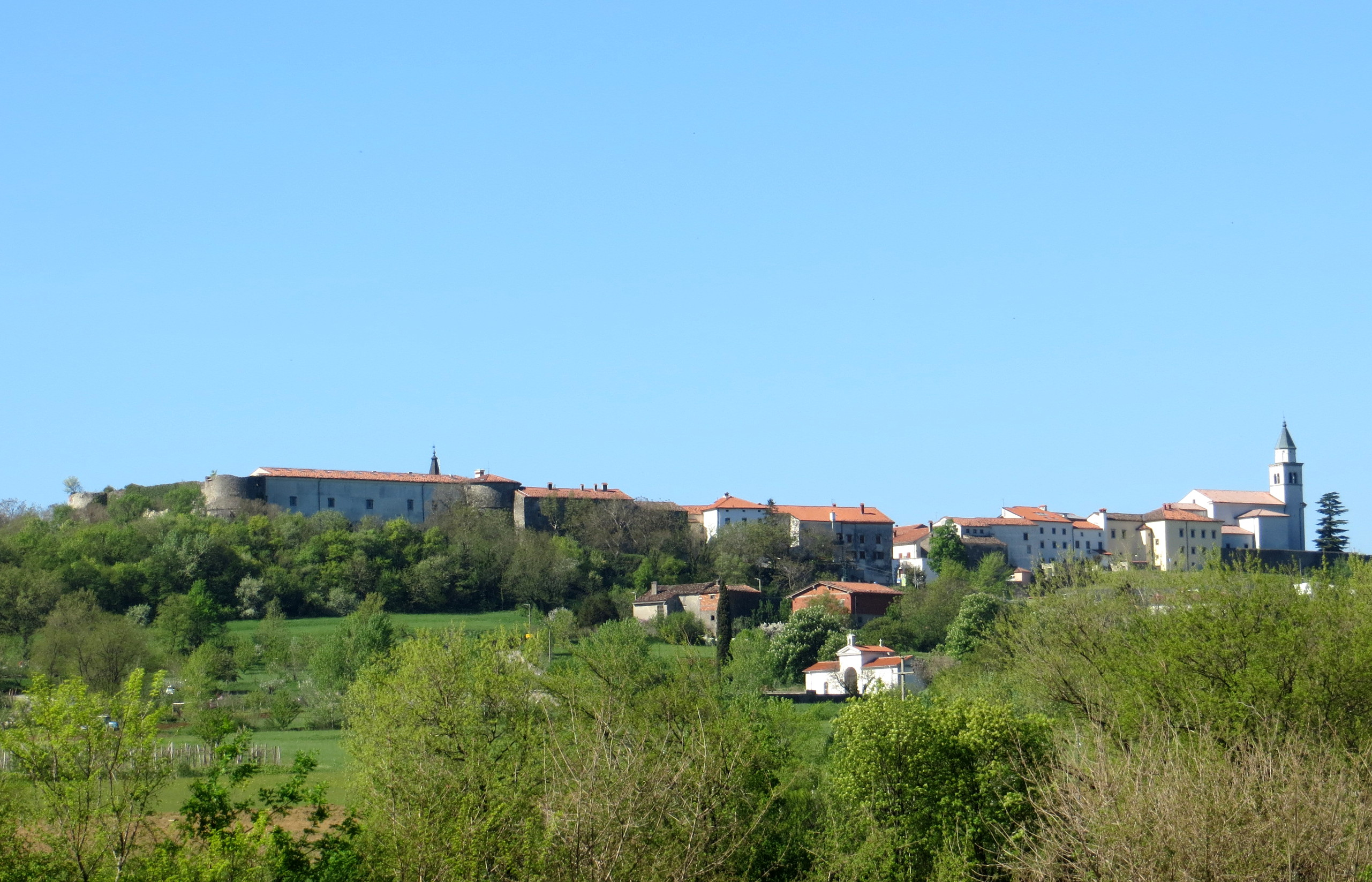

- Location in Slovenia
- Coordinates: 45°52′51.82″N 13°51′41.87″E
- Country: Slovenia
- Traditional region: Littoral
- Statistical region: Gorizia
- Municipality: Ajdovščina

Area
  - Total: 0.49 km^{2} (0.19 sq mi)
- Elevation: 177.7 m (583 ft)

Population (2020)
  - Total: 170
  - Density: 350/km^{2} (900/sq mi)

Vipavski Križ (pronounced [ʋiˈpaːu̯ski ˈkɾiːʃ]; Italian: Santa Croce di Aidussina) is a settlement on a small hill in the Vipava Valley in the Municipality of Ajdovščina in the Littoral region of Slovenia. There is evidence of habitation on the hill in the pre-Roman period. The settlement was first mentioned in written documents dating to the 13th century. The houses in the village are clustered inside a defence wall around a castle from the late 15th century. It was built to protect the residents against Ottoman raids. In 1532 Vipavski Križ was declared a town. In 1636 a Capuchin monastery with a rich library was founded in the town and it is now open to visitors.

== Name ==
The name of the settlement was changed from Sveti Križ (literally, 'holy cross') to Vipavski Križ (literally, 'Vipava cross') in 1955. The name was changed on the basis of the 1948 Law on Names of Settlements and Designations of Squares, Streets, and Buildings as part of efforts by Slovenia's postwar communist government to remove religious elements from toponyms. A referendum was held in 1999 on whether to restore the name Sveti Križ, but 51% of the voters favored retaining the name Vipavski Križ.

== Parish church ==
The parish church in the settlement is dedicated to the Exaltation of the Cross and belongs to the Diocese of Koper.

== Notable people ==
- Tobia Lionelli (Slovene: Janez Svetokriški; 1647–1714), Slovene preacher
- Rudolf Perhinek (1906–1982), Yugoslav military officer, Chetnik
