= Radul =

Radul / Radule
- Gender: male
- Language: Slavic

Origin
- Origin: Slavic
- Meaning: rad ("work, care, joy")

Other names
- Variant form: Radule
- Nickname: Rade
- Related names: Radu (Romanian)

Radul or Radule (Cyrillic: Радул) is a Slavic given name, derived from the word rad, meaning "work, care ". It is the base of the Serbian surnames of Radulović, Radulić, Raduljica, and the Russian and Bulgarian Radulov. Several toponyms are derived from the name, such as Radule in Poland, Radul in Ukraine, Radulovtsi in Bulgaria, etc.

It may refer to:

- Radul Milkov (1883–1962), Bulgarian pioneer of aviation
- Radul Petrović, brother of Danilo I, Metropolitan of Cetinje
- Radul, fresco master who painted the Serbian Orthodox monasteries of Ostrog and Praskvica
- Radul the Grammarian
- Radule Božović, a Serbian Orthodox priest executed in 1945 for supporting the Chetnik movement
- Vladimir Radusinović, nicknamed Radule, singer and guitarist of Atheist Rap
- Nikola Radulović (footballer), nicknamed Radule
- Radule, a character in Serbian epic poetry
- Vojvoda Radule, an 18th-century Montenegrin warrior
- Radule Radulović, Bosnian footballer
- Radule Jevrić
- Radule Živković
- Radul of Riđani

== See also ==
- Judy Radul, Canadian multidisciplinary artist, writer and educator
- Zograf Radul, Serbian archpriest, writer, painter, and woodcarver
