= Bajo Stanišić =

Montenegrin Chetnik leader

- Бајо Станишић
- Born: May 16, 1890; Vinići, Principality of Montenegro
- Died: October 21, 1943 (aged 53); Ostrog Monastery, Italian governorate of Montenegro
- Military career
- Allegiance: Montenegro (1907–1918); Yugoslavia (1918–1941); Chetniks (1941–1943); Italy (1942–1943)
- Service years: 1907–1943
- Rank: Colonel
- Unit: Zeta Chetnik Dettachment
- Conflicts: World War II in Yugoslavia: June uprising in eastern Herzegovina (1941); Uprising in Montenegro; Case White

Bajo Stanišić (Serbian Cyrillic: Бајо Станишић; 1890–1943) was a Montenegrin officer of the Royal Yugoslav Army, who was one of the participants of the Uprising in Montenegro against the Italian occupation forces in 1941. After the suppression of the uprising, he became one of the commanders of the Chetnik units in Montenegro and openly collaborated with Fascist Italy until his death in 1943.

== Uprising in Montenegro ==
Stanišić was a member of the Supreme Command of the insurgent forces during the Uprising in Montenegro.

== Anti-communist struggle and collaboration with the Italians ==
On 11 February 1942, after the uprising had been suppressed, Stanišić conducted a coup near Danilovgrad. On that occasion, two companies from the "Bijeli Pavle" detachment joined him. Later that month, he established the National Army of Montenegro and Herzegovina (Serbian: Народна војска Црне Горе и Херцеговине) comprising six battalions, most of which were Chetniks, and appointed himself as their commander. On 17 February and 6 March 1942, Stanišić concluded collaboration agreements with the Italian military governor, Alessandro Pirzio Biroli. In the agreement from March 1942, signed by Colonel Bajo Stanišić writes that "Montenegrin nationalists, regardless of the final outcome of the war, will never use weapons against Italian troops."

Stanišić commanded the Zeta Chetnik Detachment, and according to his agreement with the Italians, his detachment was responsible for the territories of Nikšić, Danilovgrad and Podgorica. His superior commander was Blažo Đukanović, but Italians always had a final say regarding military matters. Stanišić wanted to negotiate with Partisans but Ivan Milutinović, a commander of the Partisan forces in Montenegro, did not reply to Stanišić's offer. In May 1943, Chetniks lost control over large part of Montenegro to Yugoslav Partisans. Mihailović harshly criticized Pavle Đurišić and Stanišić for such a loss, describing Stanišić's troops as beneath criticism. Shortly before his death, Stanišić proposed that Draža Mihailović soften his position toward the separatist "Greens" in Montenegro.

== Death ==
In mid October 1943, General Đukanović and Stanišić with 25 of their soldiers were located at their headquarters in the Ostrog Monastery. By 14 October they were besieged by stronger Partisan units that demanded their surrender, otherwise the Partisans threatened to destroy the monastery and kill them all. After a fierce resistance, Đukanović and 22 soldiers laid their weapons on 18 October, but Stanišić and three of his relatives decided not to give up. Stanišić was shot dead by the Partisans on 21 October, while Stanišić's relatives committed suicide.

Đukanović and his soldiers who surrendered to the Partisans were executed on the same day. They were buried in two mass graves. In 1948, the communists built pit toilets above the graves of Đukanović and his Chetniks for the use of workers who built a railway from Nikšić to Podgorica.

Stanišić was buried in Ostrog, below the Upper Monastery. On 20 October 1945, the Yugoslav authorities excavated his bones and threw them into sinkholes around the monastery. The monks collected his bones and secretly buried them in a grave below the Upper Monastery.

== Legacy ==
The killing of Bajo Stanišić and Blažo Đukanović is commemorated in a song the Victory below Ostrog (Serbian: Побједа под Острогом).

== Notes ==
=== References ===
- Milazzo, Matteo J. (1975). The Chetnik Movement & the Yugoslav Resistance. Baltimore, Maryland: Johns Hopkins University Press. ISBN 978-0-8018-1589-8.
- Pajović, Radoje (1987). Pavle Đurišić (in Serbo-Croatian). Zagreb, Yugoslavia: Centar za informacije i publicitet. ISBN 978-86-7125-006-1.
- Tomasevich, Jozo (1975). The Chetniks. Stanford University Press. ISBN 978-0-8047-0857-9.
- Tomasevich, Jozo (2001). War and Revolution in Yugoslavia, 1941–1945: Occupation and Collaboration. Stanford, California: Stanford University Press. ISBN 978-0-8047-3615-2.
- Živković, Milutin D. (2017). Санџак 1941–1943 [Sandžak 1941–1943] (Doctoral) (in Serbo-Croatian). Belgrade: University of Belgrade. OCLC 1242119546.
