= Radulov =

Radulov (Russian and Bulgarian: Радулов) is a Russian and Bulgarian masculine surname derived from the male given name Radul, its feminine counterpart is Radulova. Notable people with the surname include:

- Alexander Radulov (born 1986), Russian hockey player
- Igor Radulov (born 1982), Russian hockey player
- Ivan Radulov (born 1939), Bulgarian chess player
- Semen Radulov (born 1989), Ukrainian freestyle wrestler
- Troyan Radulov (born 1974), Bulgarian footballer

== See also ==
- Radulović, Serbian variant
