= National Army of Montenegro and Herzegovina =

Commanders
- Commander: Bajo Stanišić

The National Army of Montenegro and Herzegovina (Serbian: Народна војска Црне Горе и Херцеговине) was a military unit established by Colonel Bajo Stanišić in February 1942. It was composed of six battalions, some of them being Chetniks, with Stanišić being its commander.
