= John S. Lekson =

United States Army general (1917–1992)

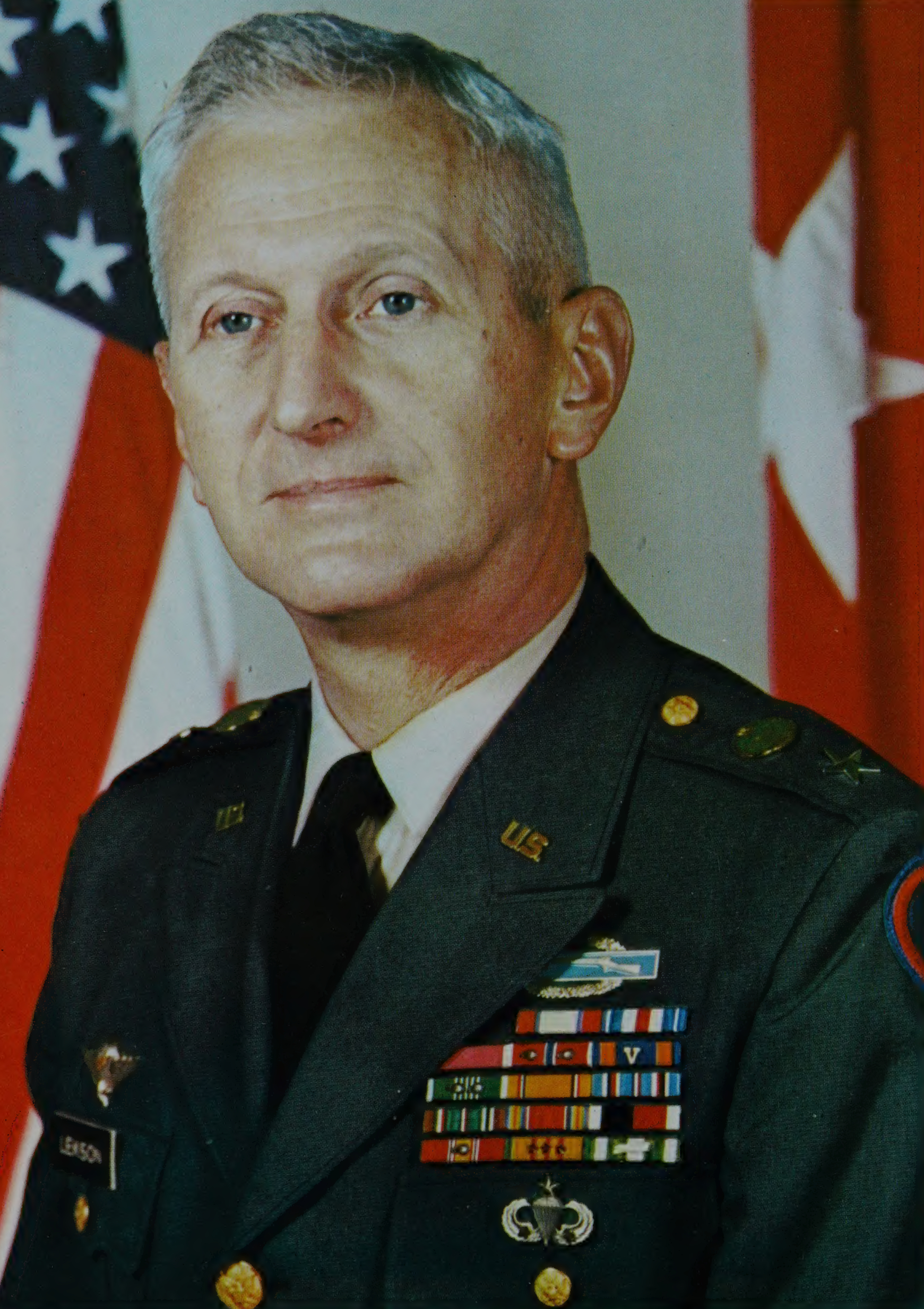
- Lekson as Fort Campbell Army Training Center commander c. 1970
- Born: 14 April 1917; Fairpoint, Ohio
- Died: 1992 (aged 74–75)
- Burial place: Arlington National Cemetery
- Military career
- Allegiance: United States of America
- Branch: United States Army
- Service years: 1940–1975
- Rank: Major General
- Units: 504th Parachute Infantry, 82 Airborne Division
- Conflicts: World War II: North African Campaign; Italian Campaign; Battle of the Bulge; Vietnam War
- Awards: Distinguished Service Medal; Silver Star; Legion of Merit; Bronze Star

John S. Lekson (April 14, 1917 – January 19, 1992) was a United States Army major general.

He was born to Slovenian immigrant parents. He graduated from Western Reserve University and enlisted in the Ohio National Guard in 1940 as a private. He was commissioned through Officer Candidate School and rose to major during World War II. During the war, he served with the 82nd Airborne Division, including the 504th Parachute Infantry, and fought in North Africa, Italy, the Netherlands and Germany, including the Battle of the Bulge. He also served in Austria, Italy and Korea.

In Vietnam, he served as Assistant Commander of the 9th Infantry Division and the 101st Airborne Division in 1967–68, subsequently rising in rank to major general. His final assignment was Director of Operations for the Readiness Command, predecessor of the U.S. Central Command. He retired in 1975.

His medals included the Distinguished Service Medal, the Silver Star, the Legion of Merit and the Bronze Star.

He died in 1992 and was buried at Arlington National Cemetery, in Arlington, Virginia.
