= Leftist errors =

Radical policies of the Communist Party of Yugoslavia during World War II

- Part of World War II in Yugoslavia
- Location: Axis-occupied Yugoslavia; Montenegro; Herzegovina; Serbia; to a lesser extent: Croatia and Slovenia
- Date: July 1941 – Spring 1942
- Deaths: 1941–42: Herzegovina: 500; Montenegro: 500–624
- Perpetrator: Communist Party of Yugoslavia: Yugoslav Partisans

Leftist errors (Serbo-Croatian: leva/lijeva skretanja, лева/лијева скретања) were a term used by the Communist Party of Yugoslavia (CPY) to describe radical policies and strategies – described as the Red Terror (Crveni Teror) by others – pursued by self-described left-wing elements among the party and partisan units during World War II, mostly in Montenegro, Herzegovina, and Serbia, as well as to a lesser extent in Croatia and Slovenia.

From 1941–1942, these areas saw mass executions, burning of villages and confiscation of property, motivated both by partisan fears of a "fifth column" and class conflict. As a result of these actions by the communists, many villagers from Montenegro and eastern Herzegovina joined Chetnik forces en masse. The Communist Party of Yugoslavia condemned actions undertaken during the period and punished several local commanders.

== Name ==
This policy was also referred to as leftist deviation or left-wing deviation, left errors or sectarian deviations. In Titoist dogma after World War II, this policy was referred to as the "Mistakes of the left" or "left deviations" while the others referred to it as "Red Terror". This policy is sometimes referred to as the "Second Stage". Karl Marx believed that revolution has two stages: bourgeois-democratic and proletarian. He believed that in the second stage the proletarian revolution has to turn against its allies from the first stage.

== Background ==
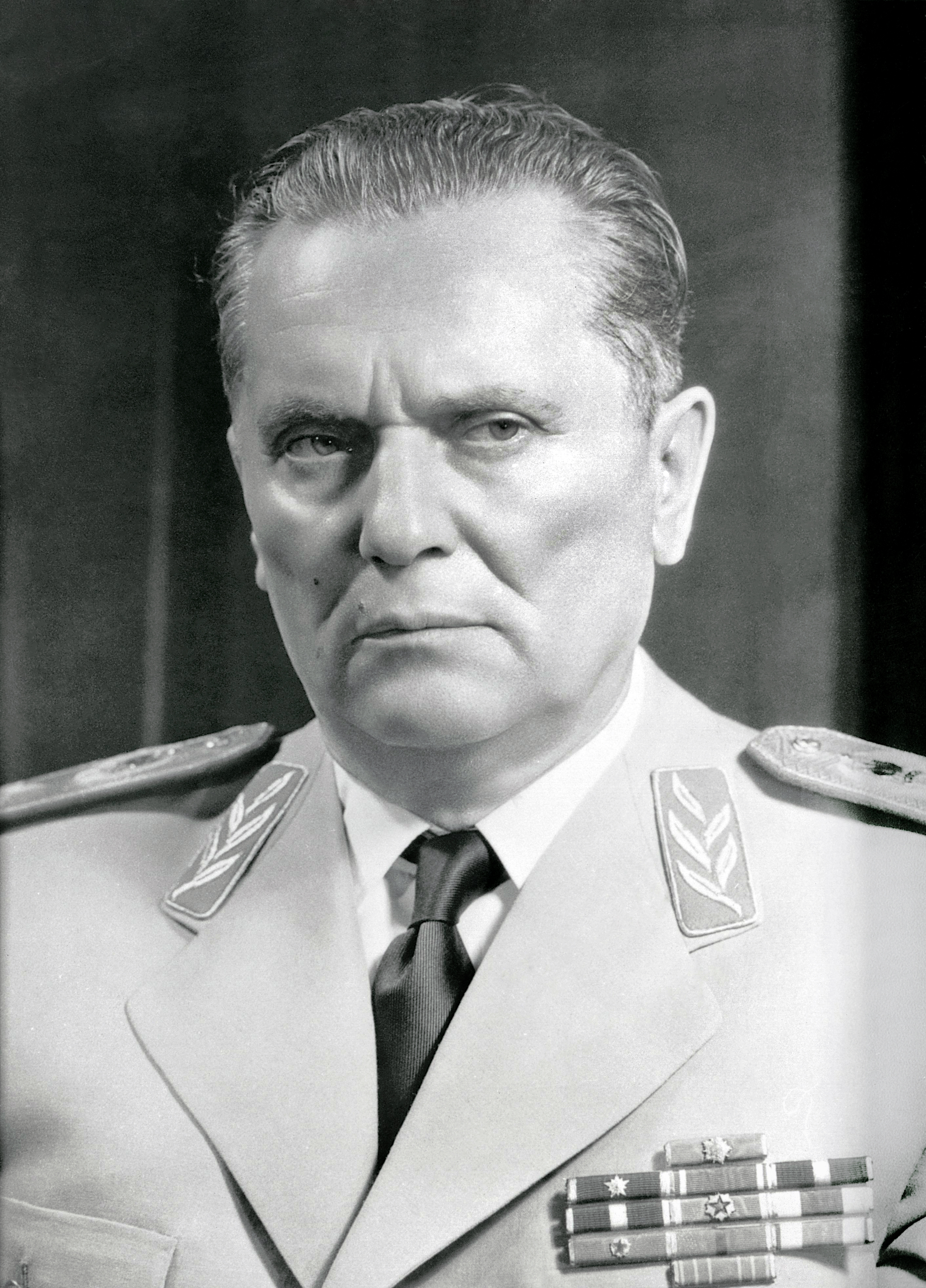
Tito formulated the leftist strategy of the CPY in October 1940

Tito was the main protagonist of the leftist deviations. His formal appointment as general secretary of the Communist Party of Yugoslavia (CPY) was confirmed in October 1940, during the Fifth Land Conference of the CPY in Zagreb. At this conference, Tito formulated the leftist strategy of the CPY as focused on revolutionary seizure of power in the country in order to organize Soviet-style administrative system in Yugoslavia.

In July 1941, after the German attack on the Soviet Union, the Communist Politburo adopted a strategy insisting that the Partisans should aim to create "liberated territories", cleared of enemies. According to the instructions of the Politburo, such territories were to be administered by the Communists in a state-like manner, so that the local population would be exposed to the ideas and practices of socialism. In the territories that came under their control, the Communists implemented many radical policies. This antagonized many peasants in Serbia, Montenegro, and Herzegovina. Laziness was punished as desertion, and peasants were punished with high taxes or forced labor if their houses were not tidy or if they got lice. The Yugoslav communists suspended the instructions not to proceed to the second stage (the revolution) given by the Comintern in June 1941. They ignored instructions from Moscow to find a modus vivendi with the other resistance movement, Mihailović's Chetniks, because they thought doing so could put communist revolutionary action in danger. That is why Tito rejected Soviet pleas to cooperate with the Chetniks and insisted on carrying on with the communist revolution.

== By region ==
=== Montenegro ===
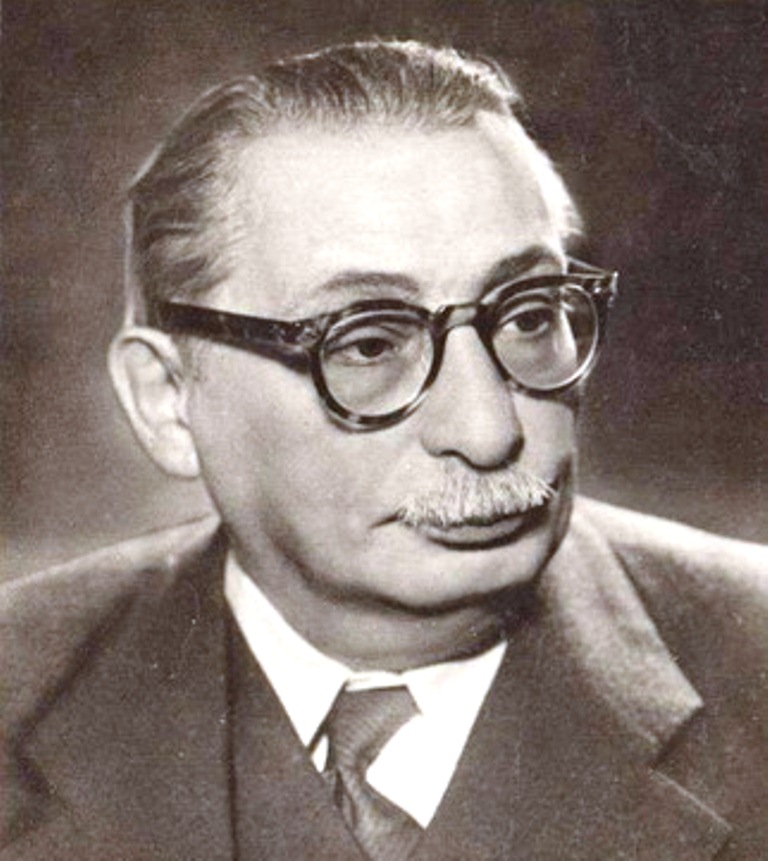
Moša Pijade, one of the main protagonists of leftist errors in Montenegro

In June 1941, the Regional Committee of the CPY for Montenegro, Boka and Sandžak issued a proclamation inviting people to join the "final liquidation of the capitalist system". The leftist errors policy was pursued in Montenegro beginning in August, and its intensity increased after September 1941. This extremist policy was pursued by the Partisans in Montenegro under the influence of Milovan Đilas and Moša Pijade. After the initial success of the Uprising in Montenegro, the Communists seized control of almost all the territory of Montenegro and began to fight against their class enemies. A substantial percentage of the population of Montenegro supported the Chetniks because they were afraid of the "Red Terror". Despite instructions to minimize the revolutionary side of their policies, the leaders of the Montenegrin Partisans introduced "Soviet elements" in the summer of 1941, during the Uprising in Montenegro, because they perceived the uprising as the first stage of the communist revolution. On 27 July 1941, the Communist command for Montenegro issued an order for the establishment of courts-martial aimed against those who they perceived as fifth columnists ending their order with the proclamation "Patriots, destroy the fifth column and victory is ours!".

In mid-August 1941, Đilas wrote a letter to the Regional Committee of Yugoslav Communist Party for Montenegro, Boka and Sandžak and recommended an isolation and destruction of the fifth column. He emphasized that tolerance and inactivity of communists toward spies is a crime equal to treason. At the end of August 1941 the Regional Committee issued a directive which followed the recommendations of Đilas and insists on cleansing of the villages from the fifth column. In another directive issued in October the Regional Committee repeated similar instructions insisting on the destruction of those who disturb the mobilization of insurgents even by saying "wait, it's not the right moment yet". Đilas himself wrote how retreating Partisans, who only punished their opponents in July, arbitrarily executed them following the Italian counteroffensive of August 1941.

From September 1941 onward, Communist Party program documents began to mention courts authorized to prescribe the death penalty. This was immediately put into practice. Since October 1941, the headquarters of Partisan forces in Montenegro, Boka and Sandžak published lists of executed "enemies of the people, including spies and traitors" with a note - "to be continued...". During the first year the victims included women who "flirted" with Italians. Most of the people killed by the communists in 1941 were military and administrative officers of former Kingdom of Yugoslavia before the war. According to professor Jozo Tomasevich, during the period of "leftist deviation" from c. December 1941 through May 1942, the Partisans, especially in Herzegovina and Montenegro, used terror against people who were not collaborating, but were potential class enemies.

The Partisans occupied Kolašin in January and February 1942, and turned against all real and potential opposition, killing about 300 people and throwing their mangled corpses into pits they called the dog cemetery. Due to this and other examples of communist terror, a part of Montenegrin population turned against the Partisans. According to Zbornik za istoriju, "[a] land without Chetniks was suddenly overwhelmed by Chetniks", largely due to the policies of Left Deviations. Communist executions of notable tribal chieftains in Montenegro caused additional animosity of middle class peasants towards communists. Đurišić soon recaptured Kolašin and held it as a Chetnik bastion until May 1943. His rule was marked by terrorizing Partisan supporters. A large number of captured Partisans and sympathizers were executed in following weeks, including lieutenant colonel Radisav Radević, major Batrić Zečević, captains Đuro Radosavljević, Mileta Lakićević and Tomica Jojić, and former member of Yugoslav Parliament Blagota Selić, none of which were members of the Communist Party. Đurišić formed a Chetnik prison in Kolašin, in which some 2,000 opponents were incarcerated and/or tortured. Many were handed over to the Italians.

In March 1942, communists from Nikšić burned the villages of Ozrinići and Zagarač. According to some sources this was ordered by Đilas and Sava Kovačević. Between the onset of the Uprising in Montenegro and the middle of 1942, communists killed between 500 and 624 people in Montenegro, most of them during armed conflict.

=== Serbia ===
In September 1941, Serb Partisans established the Republic of Užice, a short-lived military mini-state with its administrative center in Užice. At the end of November 1941 Partisans were defeated and had to retreat from Serbia. The policy of leftist errors pursued by Tito substantially contributed to Partisan defeat in the Republic of Užice. Because of the repression of the communists and their intention to carry on with communist revolution the population of Serbia also turned against the uprising and communist insurgents. At the beginning of December 1941 the communists moved from Serbia to Bosnia (nominally NDH) and joined their comrades who had already left Montenegro.

=== Herzegovina ===
In January and February 1942 alone, Partisans executed 250 people in Eastern Herzegovina because they were accused of belonging to "fifth column". In Herzegovina alone the total number of civilians murdered by communists in 1941–42 was probably around 500.

Owing to "leftist errors" the Partisans were chased out of Herzegovina during the summer of 1942, not by the Axis forces but by its population.

== Consequences ==
The policy of leftist deviation proved counterproductive. Leftist deviation gave a real meaningful sense to the policy of those nationalists who found a way out of the difficult situation in collaboration with occupying and quisling forces. "Red terror" antagonized most of the peasantry and angered the Soviet Union. As a result of the communist actions, villagers from Eastern Herzegovina and Montenegro, who were far from being collaborators or kulaks, joined Chetnik forces en masse.

In February 2018 a pit called Jama Kotor with allegedly about 300 corpses of victims of red terror was examined in Gornje Polje village near Nikšić. Many human bones were found together with remaining parts of clothes. This was reported to the police that announced official investigation.

== Propaganda ==
The songs and mottoes were composed to promote the policy of leftist deviations. The verse of one of them was: "Partisans, prepare machine guns, to greet the king and Englishmen" (Serbo-Croatian: Партизани, спремите митраљезе да чекамо краља и Енглезе / Partizani, spremite mitraljeze da čekamo kralja i Engleze). The Partisan slogan "Death to fascism, freedom to the people", a new greeting "Red Army is with us – the victory is ours!"

== Major proponents ==
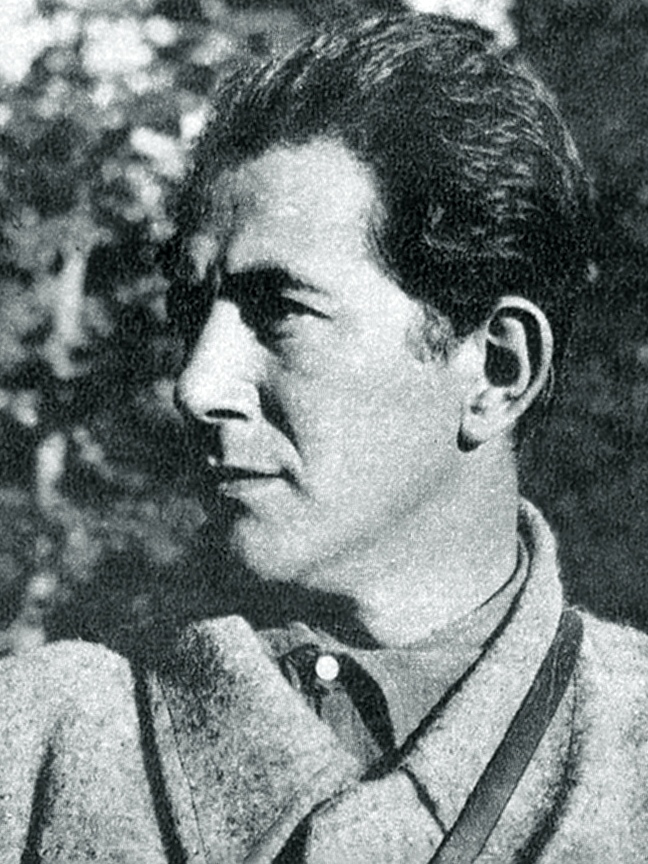
Milovan Đilas, one of the major exponents of the leftist errors

Major proponents of this policy included Milovan Đilas, Ivan Milutinović and Boris Kidrič. The Communist Party of Yugoslavia later publicly condemned this policy and punished (by warning them) several local commanders (Petar Drapšin and Miro Popara in Herzegovina and several Montenegrin party leaders). Petar Drapšin was stripped of his rank, removed from all functions in the communist party and its membership. Moša Pijade was held responsible for the adoption of brutal extremist policy of the CPY.

On 22 October, or in November 1941, Tito dismissed Milovan Đilas from the command of Partisan forces in Montenegro because of his mistakes during the uprising, including his leftist errors.

Tito claimed Đilas made mistakes because he organized a frontal struggle of armies against a much stronger enemy instead of connecting the Partisan struggle with the people's uprising and adopting the partisan methods of resistance. Đilas was appointed as editor of the paper Borba, the Party's main propaganda organ. While Tito repeatedly accused other communist officials from Montenegro for "sectarianism", Edvard Kardelj admitted to Đilas that "grave sectarian errors were made in Serbia in 1941" (under Tito's administration).

== In literature ==
In his 1997 work titled Zlotvori, Serbian writer and member of Serbian Academy Dragoslav Mihailović also mentioned leftist errors as mass murder of notable people such as army veterans, teachers and priests. Svetozar Vukmanović who was a member of Partisan Supreme Headquarters in his 1998 work explained that murders of class enemies by communists in Crmnica reached massive proportions at the beginning of 1942, a day after the Orthodox Christmas. Vukmanović underlined that the Communist leadership in Montenegro pursued the policy of massive murders in whole Montenegro since that period. Yugoslav writer Mirko Kovač published in 2008 a literature work Pisanje ili nostalgija in which he ridiculed some texts about leftist errors stating that every Montenegrin personally saw when Milovan Đilas killed his political enemies.

In 2017 a book authored by historians Bošković and Vojinović was published under title The Communist crimes in Montenegro and Herzegovina 1941—1942 in which the authors presented full names of 1,839 victims of red terror in Montenegro and 522 in Herzegovina.

== See also ==
- Mass killings under Communist regimes
- Communist purges in Serbia in 1944–45
- Bleiburg repatriations
- Foibe massacres
- Kočevski Rog massacre
- Communist massacre of Cetinje civilians
