= Ostrog Monastery =

Serbian Orthodox monastery near Danilovgrad, Montenegro

Coordinates: 42°40′30″N 19°01′45″E

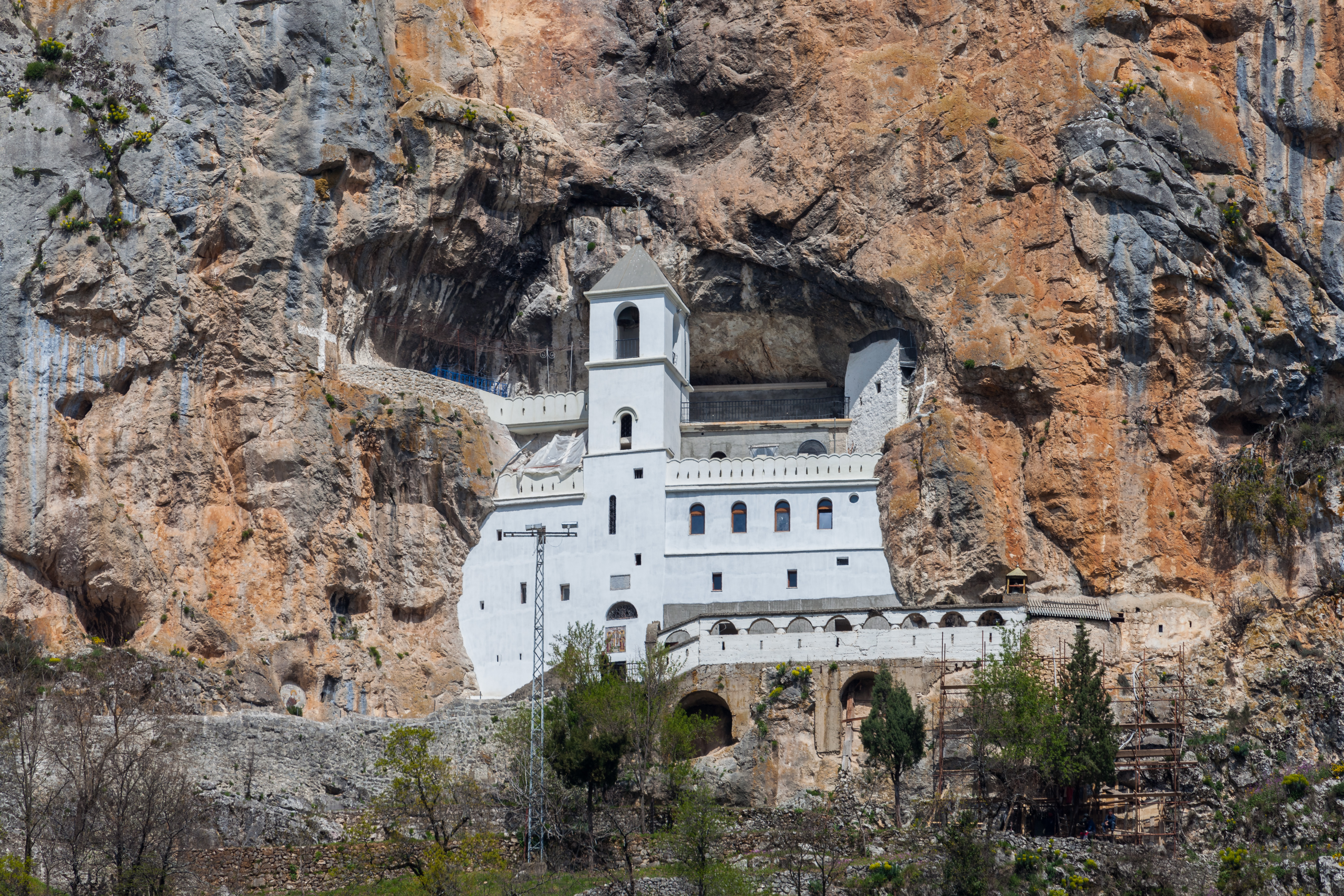
- Interactive map of Ostrog Monastery

Monastery information
- Order: Serbian Orthodox Church
- Established: 17th century 1923–1926 (reconstruction)
- Dedication: Saint Basil of Ostrog
- Diocese: Metropolitanate of Montenegro and the Littoral

People
- Founder: Saint Basil of Ostrog

Site
- Location: Danilovgrad, Montenegro
- Visible remains: Saint Basil of Ostrog

The Ostrog Monastery (Serbian: Манастир Острог, romanized: Manastir Ostrog, pronounced [ǒstroɡ]) is a Serbian Orthodox monastery near Danilovgrad, Montenegro. Situated against an almost vertical background, high up in the large rock of Ostroška Greda, it is dedicated to Saint Basil of Ostrog, who was buried here.

Ostrog Monastery is the single most visited pilgrimage site within the Serbian Orthodox Church, receiving 1 to 1.2 million people annually.

== History ==
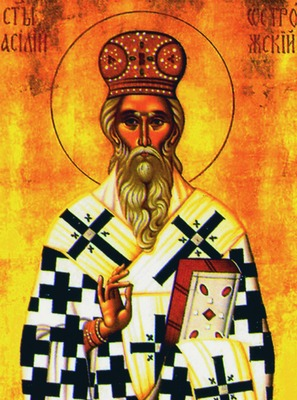
Saint Basil of Ostrog

The Monastery was founded in the early 17th century by Vasilije Jovanović, better known as St.Basil of Ostrog, the Metropolitan of Herzegovina, and is first mentioned on a geographical map of[Montenegro from 1640. Vasilije died there in 1671 and some years later he was glorified. His body is enshrined in a reliquary kept in the cave-church dedicated to the Presentation of the Theotokos.

The present-day look was given to the Monastery in 1923–1926, after a fire which had destroyed the major part of the complex. The two little cave-churches were spared and they are the key areas of the monument. The frescoes in the Church of the Presentation were created towards the end of the 17th century. The other church, dedicated to the Holy Cross, is placed within a cave on the upper level of the monastery and was painted by master Radul, who successfully coped with the natural shapes of the cave and laid the frescoes immediately on the surface of the rock and the south wall. Around the church are monastic residences.

During World War II, German forces looted gold from the monastery. It would also become a place of refuge for a detachment of Chetniks led by Blažo Đukanović and Bajo Stanišić took refuge at Ostrog up to October 18, 1943, when Yugoslav Partisans promised the Chetniks that their lives would be spared if they surrendered. Đukanović and 23 Chetniks peacefully surrendered, expecting to be spared, but were all killed by the Partisans at Ostrog. Stanišić and three members of his extended family initially did not surrender, but did not survive at Ostrog. There are different accounts on what happened to Stanišić and his family; sources contradict each other on whether Stanišić and his family were killed fighting the Partisans or committed suicide at Ostrog.

The Ostog Monastery is one of the most frequently visited in Southeastern Europe. It attracts over 100,000 visitors a year. It is visited by believers from all parts of the world, either individually or in groups. It represents the meeting place of all confessions: the Orthodox, the Catholics, and the Muslims. According to the stories of pilgrims, by praying by next to the body of Saint Basil, many have been cured and helped in lessening the difficulties in their lives.

== Architecture ==
=== Upper Monastery ===
The Upper Monastery houses the Church of the Presentation and the Church of the Holy Cross. Saint Basil of Ostrog's relics lie in the Church of the Presentation. Also of interest is the vine which grows out of the rock. It is said that it is a miracle because nothing should be able to grow out of the sheer rock face.

=== Lower Monastery ===
The Lower Monastery centers on the Church of the Holy Trinity were built in 1824. It also makes up most of the monk residences. There are dorm rooms available for pilgrims here too.

== Traditions ==
It is traditional for pilgrims to walk the 3 km from the lower monastery to the upper monastery barefoot. Before entering the Church of the Presentation to pray before Saint Basil of Ostrog, pilgrims make a donation of clothing, blankets or consumables like soap for the monks. The monastery celebrates its feast day on 12 May every year. St Basil died on 29 April in the Gregorian calendar which equates to 12 May in the Orthodox calendar .

== Gallery ==
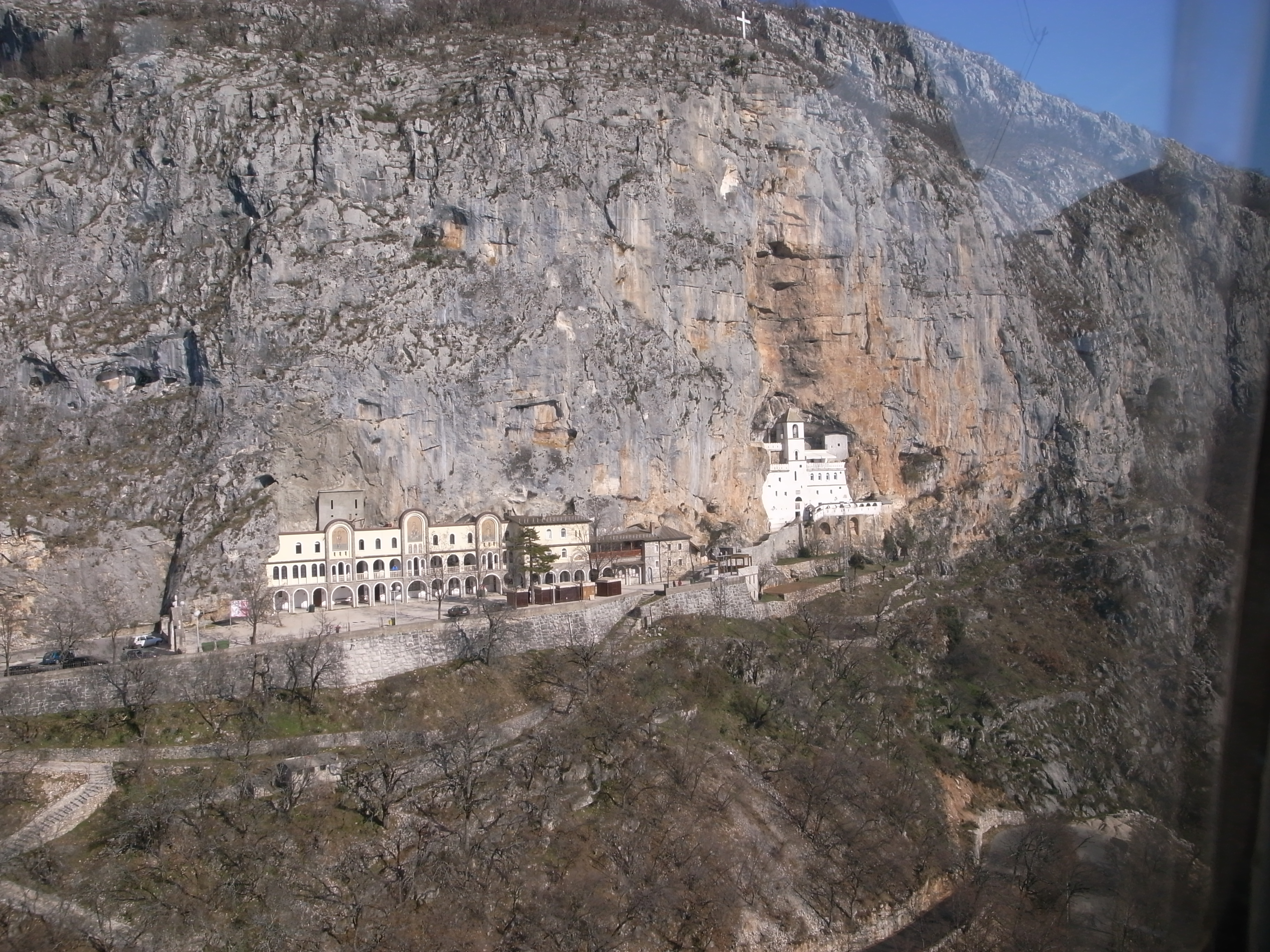
Upper Monastery

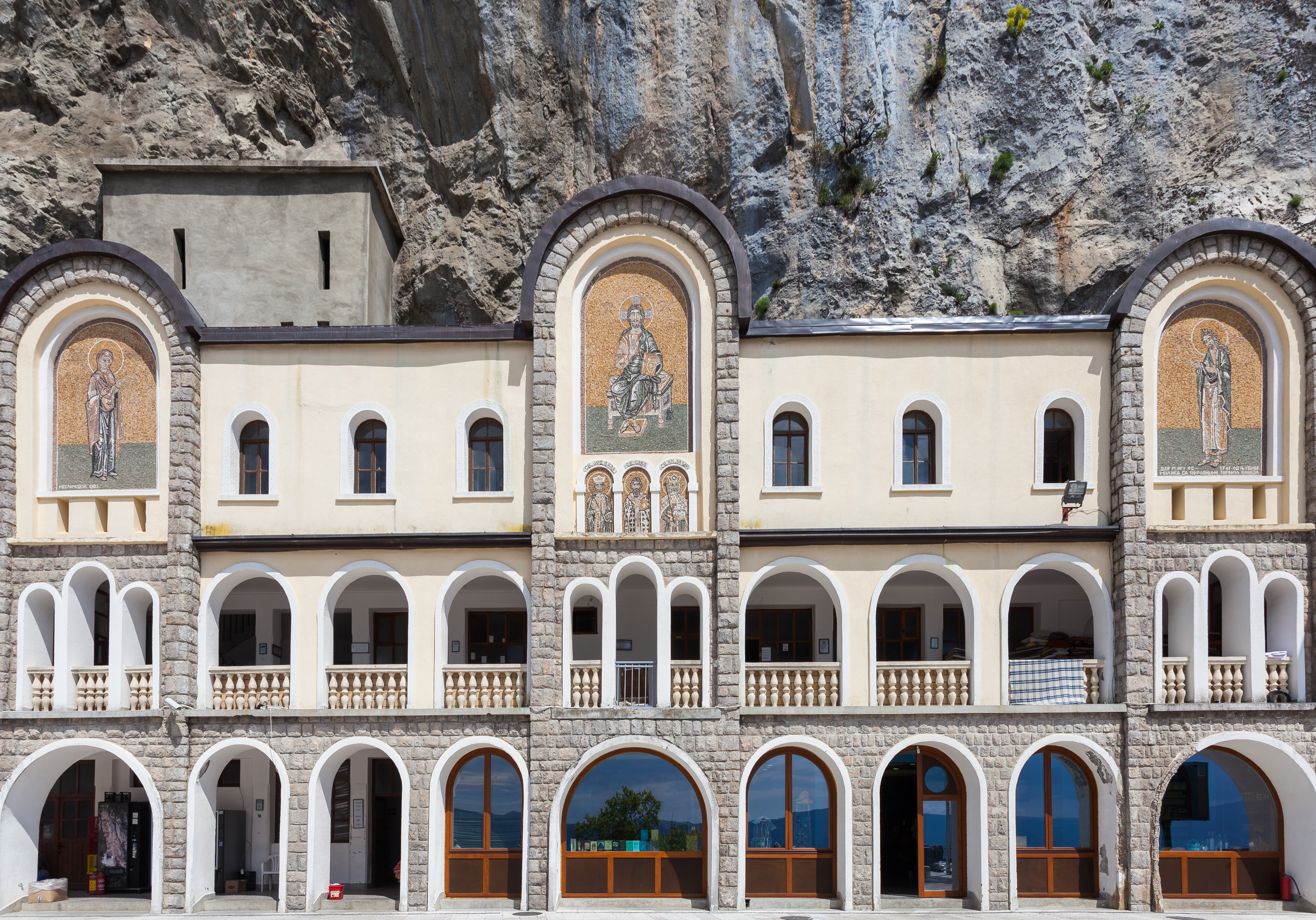
Upper Monastery quarters

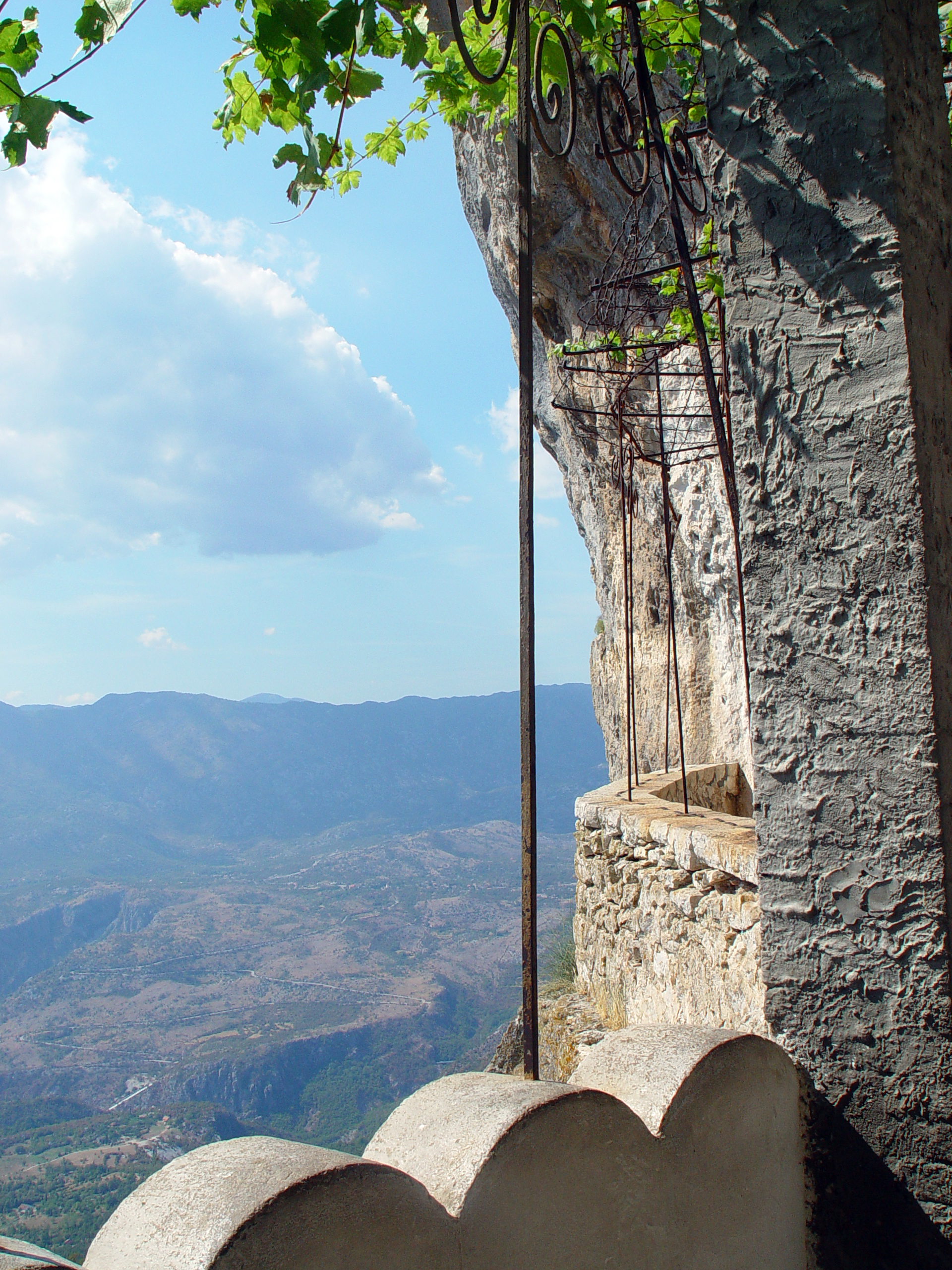
View from the Upper Monastery church

== See also ==
- List of Serbian monasteries

== Sources ==
- Radomir Nikčević; Vesna Nikčević (2003). Ostrog Monastery. Svetigora. ISBN 978-86-7660-005-2.
