= Bare Kraljske =

Bare Kraljske Баре Краљске
- Village
- Location within Montenegro
- Coordinates: 42.746884°N 19.620607°E
- Country: Montenegro
- Region: Northern
- Municipality: Kolašin

Population (2011)
  - Total: 175
- Time zone: UTC+1 (CET)
  - Summer (DST): UTC+2 (CEST)

Bare Kraljske (Montenegrin Cyrillic: Баре Краљске) is a village in the municipality of Kolašin, Montenegro.

== Demographics ==
According to the 2011 census, its population was 175.

Ethnicity in 2011
Ethnicity	Number	Percentage
Montenegrins	108	61.7%
Serbs	65	37.1%
other/undeclared	2	1.1%
Total	175	100%
