= Rose Mary Prosen =

Slovene-American poet and essayist

- Born: November 5, 1931 Newburgh, Ohio, United States
- Died: July 17, 2008 (aged 76) Cleveland, Ohio, United States
- Occupation: Author, poet

Rose Mary Prosen (November 5, 1931 – July 17, 2008) was a Slovene-American poet and essayist.

== Life ==
Prosen was born to Slovene parents who emigrated from Lower Carniola in present-day Slovenia to Newburgh, Ohio, a village annexed by the city of Cleveland. She worked as professor of English at the Cuyahoga Community College at Cuyahoga County, Ohio.

== Works ==
As an essayist she published several articles, including the 1974 "Ethnic Literature" – Of Whom and for Whom. She also published four collections of poetry, the 1971 Poems, 1976 O The Ravages, and two collections in 1980, Apples and Thank You Michelangelo.

== Awards ==
Prosen won the 1975 Hart Crane Memorial Poetry Prize.

Her short memoir Looking Back: Newburgh won the first prize for the 1976 Growing Up Slavic in America competition.
