= Blažo Đukanović =

Montenegrin Chetnik leader

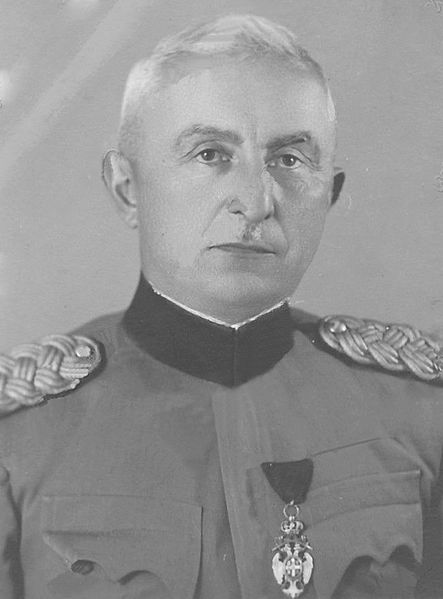
- Ðukanović c.1940

Head of the National Committee in Italian governorate of Montenegro
- In office July 1942 – October 1943
- Preceded by: Sekula Drljević (as the President of the Governing Committee)
- Succeeded by: Ljubomir Vuksanović (as the Head of the National Administrative Council)

7th Ban of Zeta
- In office 27 March – 17 April 1941
- Monarch: Peter II
- Preceded by: Božidar Krstić
- Succeeded by: Post Abolished

Personal details
- Born: 26 November 1883 Lukovo, Nikšić, Principality of Montenegro
- Died: 21 October 1943 (aged 59) Lower Ostrog Monastery, Italian governorate of Montenegro
- Cause of death: Execution by firing squad
- Occupation: Soldier; Politician

Military service
- Allegiance: Kingdom of Montenegro; Kingdom of Yugoslavia; Chetniks
- Years of service: 1912; 1914–1941
- Rank: Brigadier General
- Battles/wars: First Balkan War; World War I World War II

Blažo Đukanović (Serbian Cyrillic: Блажо Ђукановић; 26 November 1883 – 21 October 1943) was a Montenegrin Serb Chetnik brigadier general and political leader in the Italian governorate of Montenegro.

== Early life ==
Blažo Đukanović was born on 26 November 1883 in Lukovo, Nikšić, Đukanović completed gymnasium and his university education in Russia.

== World War II ==
He became the Ban of the Zeta Banovina in 1941, right up until the dissolution of the Kingdom of Yugoslavia. In 1941 he was elected the commander of all Chetnik forces in Montenegro, and local general Bajo Stanišić acknowledged him as an official spokesman of the Montenegrin Chetniks. As the leader of the Montenegrin Chetniks, on 24 July 1942 he signed a deal with the Italian army represented by General Pirzio Biroli whereby he became the head of the Central Nationalist Committee (CNC), which also included Zelenaši forces. This post made him de facto leader of Montenegro and he held it until 19 October 1943, near the date of his death. From 9 to 21 October 1942, general Đukanović visited Montenegrin cities in order to improve cooperation between Italian occupier and local civic administration. Zelenaši members of CNC led by Voja Nenadić wanted to limit Đukanović's pro-Chetnik influence. Nenadić's faction gained majority in CNC, however, with great help from Draža Mihailović and Pavle Đurišić, Đukanović stayed as head of CNC.

== Death ==
Đukanović had been attacked by Yugoslav Partisans at his headquarters at the Ostrog Monastery in October 1943. Eventually he was captured and shot along with Jovan Tošković at the walls of lower Ostrog on the 21 of October 1943.
