= Uprising in Montenegro (1941) =

Insurgency against Italian occupation in WWII

- Part of World War II in Yugoslavia
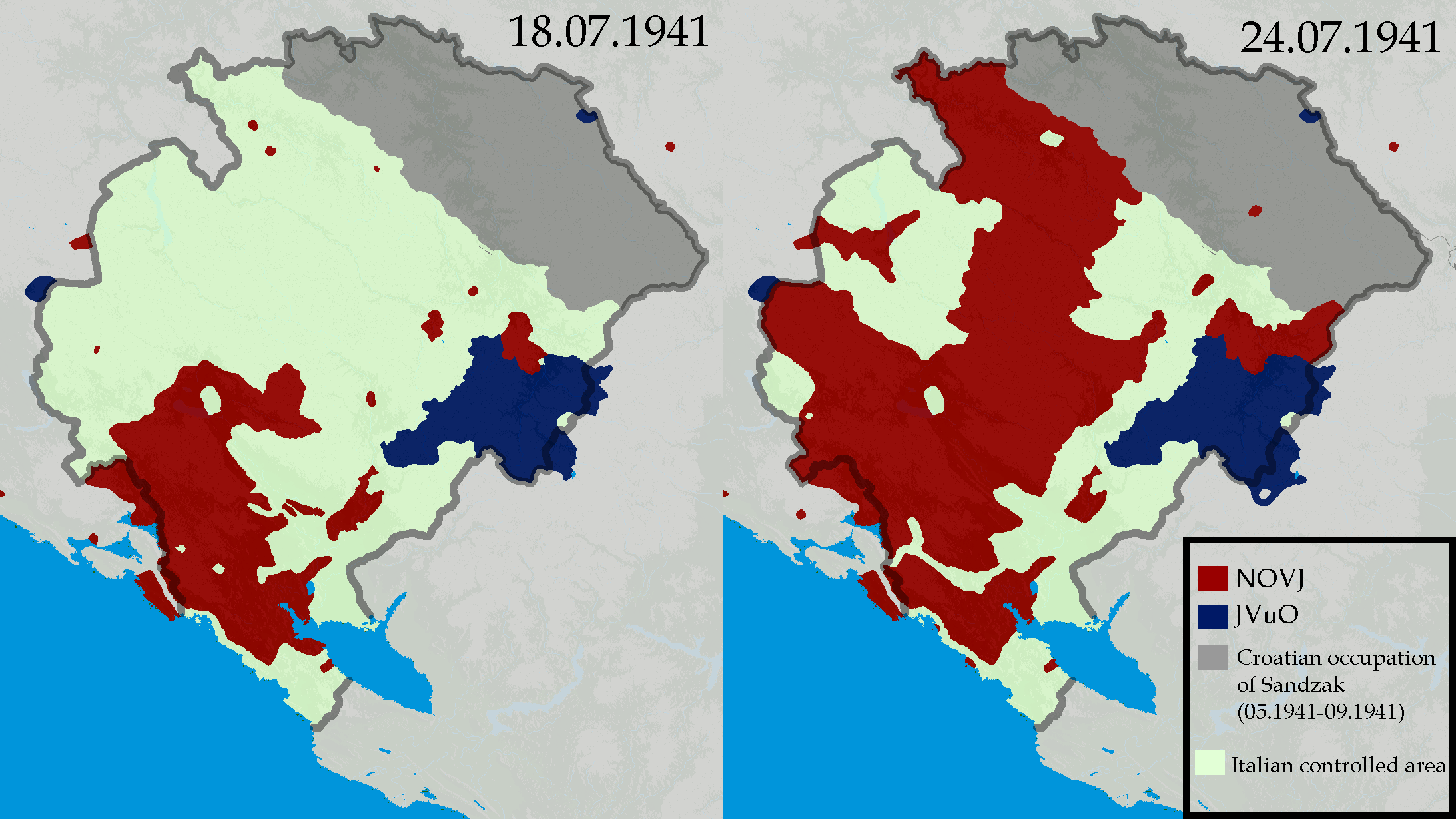
- Areas of control in Montenegro during the Uprising
Date	13 July–December 1941
Location	Italian governorate of Montenegro, Albanian Kingdom
Result	Axis victory: Uprising was suppressed within six weeks, but continued at a much lower level until December 1941.; The Chetniks switched to the occupying side in 1942.

Belligerents
Communist Party of Yugoslavia: (Yugoslav Partisans) Partisans; Montenegrin Chetniks (Kingdom of Yugoslavia) Montenegrin Whites	Italy: Governing Committee of Montenegro; Montenegrin Greens; Independent State of Croatia; (Kingdom of Albania in personal union with Italy) Albania; Sandžak militia

Commanders and leaders
(Yugoslav Partisans) Milovan Đilas; (Yugoslav Partisans) Arso Jovanović; (Yugoslav Partisans) Peko Dapčević; (Yugoslav Partisans) Vlado Dapčević; (Yugoslav Partisans) Ivan Milutinović; (Yugoslav Partisans) Moša Pijade; (Yugoslav Partisans) Rifat Burdžović; (Chetniks) Bajo Stanišić; (Chetniks) Đorđije Lašić; (Chetniks) Pavle Đurišić	(Kingdom of Italy) Pirzio Biroli; (Kingdom of Italy) Luigi Mentasti; (Independent State of Croatia) Stijepan Jakovljević; (Kingdom of Albania in personal union with Italy) Prek Cali; Sulejman Pačariz; Osman Rastoder Sekula Drljević Novica Radović Mihailo Ivanović

Units involved
Unknown	(Kingdom of Italy) Division Messina; (Kingdom of Italy) Division Puglie; (Kingdom of Italy) Division Pusteria; (Kingdom of Italy) Division Taro; (Kingdom of Italy) Division Venezia; (Kingdom of Italy) Division Cacciatori delle Alpi; (Kingdom of Italy) 2 Blackshirts Legions (108 and 164); (Kingdom of Italy) 2 Border guard Battalions; (Kingdom of Italy) 1 group of Cavalry Regiment Cavalleggeri Guide; (Independent State of Croatia) Fourth Military Regiment; Muslim militia from Sandžak, Plav and Gusinje; (Kingdom of Albania in personal union with Italy) Skanderbeg; (Kingdom of Albania in personal union with Italy) Irregular forces from Vermosh (Albania); Vulnetari from Đakovica (Kosovo)

Strength
32,000 people (Yugoslav sources)	(Kingdom of Italy) 70,000+ Italian troops (incl. reinforcements for counteroffensive); (Kingdom of Albania in personal union with Italy) Unknown; Vulnetari, Muslim, Albanian irregular forces from border areas-around 20,000

Casualties and losses
5,000 killed 7,000 wounded (July)	1,079 killed or wounded
- Civilian casualties: Hundreds killed; 10,000 deported to concentration camps

The Uprising in Montenegro (Serbo-Croatian: Ustanak u Crnoj Gori / Устанак у Црној Гори), commonly known as the 13 July Uprising (Serbo-Croatian: Trinaestojulski ustanak / Тринаестојулски устанак) was an uprising against Italian occupation forces in Montenegro (Axis occupied Yugoslavia). Initiated by the Communist Party of Yugoslavia on 13 July 1941, it was suppressed within six weeks, but continued at a much lower intensity until Battle of Pljevlja on 1 December 1941. The insurgents were led by a combination of communists and former Royal Yugoslav Army officers from Montenegro. Some of the officers had recently been released from prisoner-of-war camps following their capture during the invasion of Yugoslavia. The communists managed the organisation and provided political commissars, while the insurgent military forces were led by former officers. The entire nation rejected the privileged position offered by its occupiers, rejected the capitulation in order to fight for Yugoslavia, together with "Russia" (the nationalist insurgents perceived the Soviet Union as Russia at the beginning of the uprising).

Within three weeks of the start of the uprising, the insurgents managed to capture almost all the territory of Montenegro. The Italian troops were forced to retreat to their strongholds in Pljevlja, Nikšić, Cetinje and Podgorica. The main insurgent commanders included the former officers Colonel Bajo Stanišić and Major Đorđije Lašić, with Captain Pavle Đurišić emerging as one of the principal leaders after he distinguished himself during the successful attack he led on Berane alongside communist forces.

The counter-offensive by more than 70,000 Italian troops, commanded by General Alessandro Pirzio Biroli, was assisted by Sandžak Muslim militia and Albanian irregular forces from border areas between Montenegro and Albania, and suppressed the uprising within six weeks. The former Royal Yugoslav Army officers and communists were in dispute over the insurgent's strategy. The nationalists wanted to protect the mountain villages if they were attacked. The communists disagreed and organized a frontal struggle against Italian forces in which the rebel forces were defeated. A split occurred between the insurgents because of their defeats, which were inflicted by the Italians, and because some of the insurgents realized that the uprising was led by the communists. Josip Broz Tito dismissed Milovan Đilas from the command of Partisan forces in Montenegro because of his mistakes during the uprising, particularly because Đilas chose a frontal struggle instead of guerrilla tactics against the Italian forces and because his "Leftist Errors". After the major defeat of 1 December 1941 during the unsuccessful attack of the communist forces on the Italian garrison in Pljevlja, many soldiers deserted Partisan forces and joined the anti-Communust Chetniks. Following this defeat, the communists terrorized the people they perceived as their enemies, which antagonized many in Montenegro.

The defeat of the communist forces during the Battle of Pljevlja, combined with the policy of terror they pursued, were the main reasons for the expansion of the conflict between the communist and nationalist insurgents in Montenegro following the uprising. In the second half of December 1941, nationalist military officers Đurišić and Lašić began a mobilization of armed units separate from the Partisans.

In early March 1942, Đurišić arranged one of the first collaboration agreements between the Italians and the Chetniks. This agreement was between Đurišić and Pirzio-Biroli, and related to the area of operations of the 19th Infantry Division Venezia. In May 1942, Đurišić attacked and defeated the last significant Partisan detachment in Montenegro. Based on agreements signed by the Italians with Đurišić and other Chetnik leaders, the Italian occupation in Montenegro was then effectively reduced to towns while Chetniks remained in control of the rest of the territory of Montenegro. In the second quarter of 1942, a joint Italian-Chetnik offensive resulted in the withdrawal of the remaining Partisan forces from Montenegro.

== Background ==
In April 1941, Germany and Italy invaded Montenegro, the Germans from Bosnia and Herzegovina and the Italians from Albania. The Germans later withdrew, leaving the Italians to occupy the area.

Due to the collapse of the Yugoslav Army, the general population of Montenegro had easy access to large amounts of military arms and ammunition. By July 1941, the Communist Party of Yugoslavia had over 1,800 members and another 3,000 youth members, located in the area of Montenegro, Kotor and the Sandzak. Most of these were ready to commence an armed uprising against the Axis powers and the occupying Italians in particular. Grievances mainly related to the expulsion of Montenegrin people from the Kosovo region and Vojvodina, as well as the influx of refugees from other parts of Yugoslavia. Other refugees were fleeing the terror of the Ustaše in the regions along the borders with Bosnia and Herzegovina. The Montenegrins also hated the Italians because they had annexed important food-producing territories around Kosovo and a salt-producing facility at Ulcinj to Albania. This was coupled with the economic damage inflicted by the temporary removal from circulation of Yugoslav banknotes of 500 dinars and more.

But the event that triggered the uprising was the proclamation of a restored Kingdom of Montenegro headed by an Italian regent and led by Montenegrin separatist Sekula Drljević and his supporters, known as "Greens" (zelenaši). This proclamation was announced by the Italian Ministry of Foreign Affairs. It was issued to the Italian-convoked assembly of Montenegrin separatists held on 12 July 1941. The uprising broke out the following day.

== Uprising ==
=== Initial success of the insurgents ===
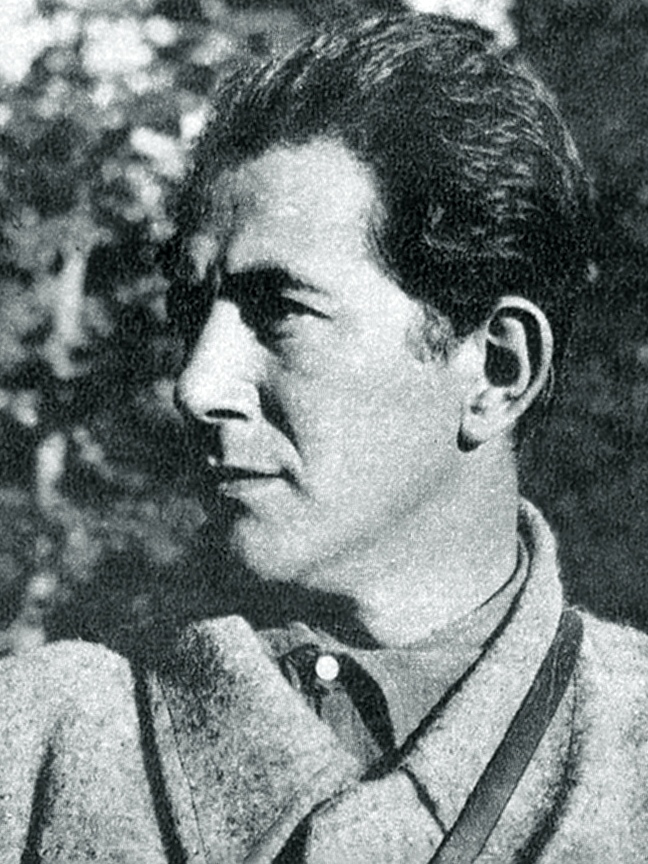
Milovan Đilas

In early July 1941, a senior Montenegrin member of the Politburo of the Central Committee of the Communist Party of Yugoslavia, Milovan Đilas, arrived in Montenegro from Belgrade to start the communist struggle against the occupying forces. The general uprising in Montenegro broke out on 13 July 1941, initiated by the Communist Party of Yugoslavia. Large numbers of non-communists joined the uprising, including many former Royal Yugoslav Army officers, some pro-communist but most having strong nationalist sentiments. It was the third uprising in Axis-occupied Yugoslavia in the summer of 1941. The insurgent forces were led by the former officers, some of whom had recently been released from prisoner-of-war camps. The communists dealt with the organisation and provided political commissars. The insurgents also included large numbers of Serb nationalists known as "Whites" (Serbian: бјелаши) and armed villagers. The insurgents seized control of small towns and villages in the early phase of the uprising.

On 14 July insurgents attacked Italian gendarmerie station in Majkovac on orders of Rifat Burdžović. Next day station, along with rest of the town were liberated. Uprisers captured gendarmerie station in Šahovići on 16 July. On 15 July in Košćele, near Rijeka Crnojevića, two detachments of 80 insurgents (from Ljubotinj and Upper Ceklin) ambushed a convoy of trucks transporting Italian II Border guard battalion from Podgorica. Italian forces were sent to release Cetinje which was besieged by the insurgents. After eight hours battle the insurgents were victorious and killed 70–80 Italian soldiers and officers, wounded 260 and captured remaining 440.

Insurgents captured several small boats in Virpazar. On 16 July they used one of them to transport 46 captured Italian soldiers to Scutari, in exchange for medical supplies and food.

On 17 July, amidst the worst of the fighting during the successful attack he led on Berane, then-Captain Pavle Đurišić distinguished himself, and emerged as one of the main commanders of the uprising. During the attack on Berane, Đurišić fought alongside communist insurgent forces. Đilas attempted to get Stanišić to accept overall command of the uprising, but Stanišić refused. On 18 July, Đilas established the Command of People's Liberation Troops of Montenegro, Boka and Sandžak under his own command, with the advice of those former Yugoslav Army officers that were willing to fight under communist control. On 20 July insurgents captured Bijelo Polje with an Italian garrison of 180 soldiers and officers.

With an expansion of uprising to Sjenica srez, uprisers clashed with NDH forces, present in Sandžak. They attacked stations in municipalities of Bare and Buđevo, and local commander Stjepan Jakovljević asked for reinforcements from multiple sources. He along with district representative held conference in Sjenica for joint fight between Ustaše and armed Muslims against uprisers, who were mostly Serbs, using pre-existing religious intolerance for their own benefit. Soon with backing of Ustaše Muslim militia were formed, which would be involved in crushing the uprising. Large attacks by uprisers on Bare and Buđevo were defeated by collaborationist forces on 21 July. In retaliation for this attack, Jakovljević's forces razed Orthodox villages Višnjeva, Goševo and part of Crvsko, as well as Orthodox houses in Bare, killing village head and expelled Orthodox population.

Within three weeks from the start of the uprising, Italian troops were forced to retreat to their strongholds in Pljevlja, Nikšić, Cetinje, and Podgorica. Milovan Đilas and Arso Jovanović were sent from Serbia to coordinate the actions of the insurgents. According to Cavallero, most of the insurgent forces were led by former officers of the Kingdom of Yugoslavia until the end of October 1941.

=== Italian counteroffensive ===
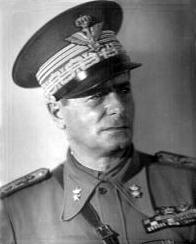
General Alessandro Pirzio Biroli believed that the only thing the Balkan mentality recognized was force.

On 16 July 1941, General Cavallero, the Commander-in-Chief of the Italian Army Group in Albania, gave order to General Alessandro Pirzio Biroli to suppress the uprising "at whatever cost." On 25 July 1941, Benito Mussolini appointed Biroli, former governor of Asmara, with complete civil and military powers in Montenegro. He believed that force was the only thing the Balkan mentality recognized. That is why he urged for extreme retaliation. On 5 August, Biroli issued an order to the population to surrender all firearms, and on 8 August, he ordered confiscation of insurgents' property.

Biroli commanded the Italian counter-offensive which was the first offensive of the occupying Axis forces in Yugoslavia. Italian troops consisted of six divisions (Messina, Puglie, Pusteria, Taro, Venezia and Cacciatori delle Alpi), two Blackshirts Legion (108 and 164), two combat groups (I group of Cavalry Regiment Cavalleggeri Guide and Skanderbeg) and two battalions of border guard. A force of more than 70,000 Italian troops attacked the insurgents, assisted by around 20,000 members of Muslem militia from Sandžak, Plav and Gusinje and Albanian irregular forces from border areas who provided flank security. The Vulnetari from Kosovo, mostly from the region of Đakovica, came to Plav and Gusinje to support the Italian counter-offensive. Transfer of two Italian divisions (Tarro and Cacciatori delle Alpi) to the Eastern Front was cancelled and they were directed against the insurgents in Montenegro.

In one of his reports written in August 1941, Biroli explained that the Division Venezia advanced from Podgorica to Kolašin and Andrijevica. He reported that this division was supported with Alpini troops and Albanian forces under command of Captain Prenk Cali from Vermosh and by forces from Đakovica. Despite fierce resistance of the insurgents, Italian forces managed to re-occupy the region of Kolašin, Andrijevica and Berane, and released from captivity 879 Italian soldiers and officers.

In the middle of August on the part of the front toward Rožaje commanded by Pavle Đurišić and toward Čakor commanded by Đorđije Lašić the rebel representatives and Italian forces organized negotiations. The delegation of rebels was headed by Milutin Jelić. The peace with Italian forces was agreed. Initially the rebel requests were the following:

1. The rebels would organize new uprising in case of an attempt of Italian government to proclaim Montenegro as independent state
2. The Albanians and Albanian military will be banned from entering the territory under rebel control and urgent stop of torching the Serb villages. In return the rebels would release prisoners they took during the uprising
3. Italian occupying forces will be considered as enemy troops until the end of war.

The Italian side accepted parts of the rebel demands by agreeing to stop torching villages and by retreating Albanian forces, while rebels obliged themselves to allow Italians to re-occupy towns captured by rebels during the uprising. Italian troops regained control over all towns and communication routes within six weeks. Biroli issued the orders to crush the revolt, but directed his forces to avoid "acts of revenge and useless cruelty". Nevertheless, in crushing the revolt, dozens of villages were burned, hundreds were killed and between 10,000 and 20,000 residents were interned. For a while, the Muslim and Albanian irregulars were permitted to pillage and torch villages.

After the counteroffensive Italians did not rebuild their posts in the villages because they were afraid they could again be an easy prey of the insurgents. As a result, most of the rural areas of Montenegro were not reoccupied. This allowed insurgents to obtain easier communication, supply and other activities.

=== Leftist errors ===
After the initial success of the uprising, communists took charge of the situation. Their bloody rule antagonized many people in Montenegro. Đilas and Partisans conducted a brief reign of terror and soon realized that such policy made it harder for them to find supplies and safe hideouts and to recruit new forces. The Partisans pursued the policy of mass terror not only against their soldiers who deserted them after the Battle of Pljevlja, but also against their families, against Chetniks and their families, against wealthier traders, peasants and any professionals they perceived as their potential class enemies. This policy is referred to as the "leftist deviation". On 22 October 1941 Tito dismissed Milovan Đilas from the command of Partisan forces in Montenegro because of his mistakes during the uprising, including his "Leftist Errors".

=== Battle of Pljevlja ===
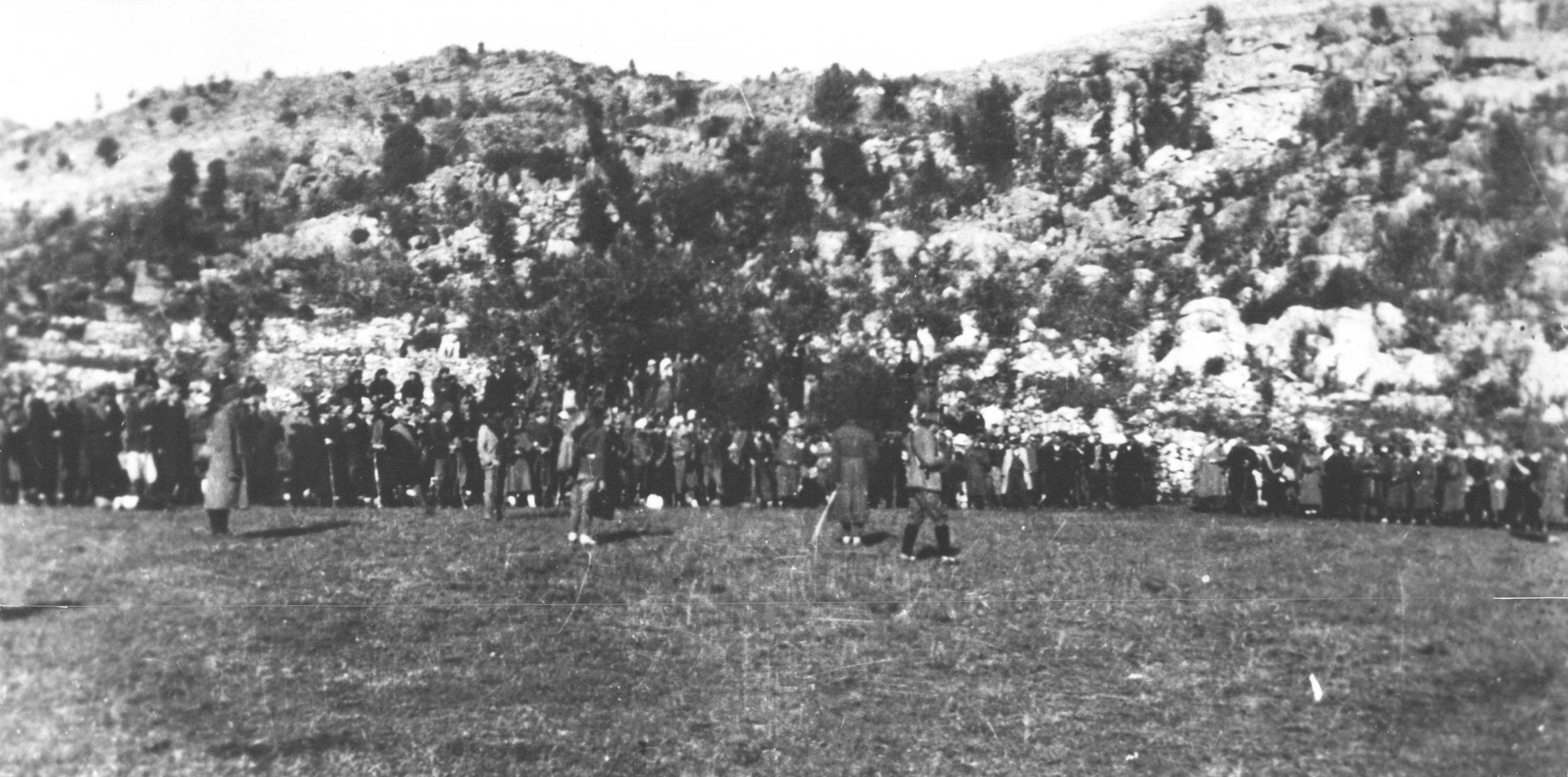
Partisans before the Battle of Pljevlja

After the setback caused by the Italian counteroffensive, toward the end of 1941, the insurgents recovered and resumed with their activities. On 1 December, the Partisan forces attacked Pljevlja but failed to capture it and retreated after suffering heavy casualties. Partisan forces counted 203 killed and 269 wounded soldiers. Many partisans deserted their units and joined the Chetniks. Following their defeat in the Battle of Pljevlja, partisans terrorized people, plundered villages and executed captured Italians, party "sectarians" and "perverts". The Battle of Pljevlja was the last major conflict of the Uprising in Montenegro. Following this battle the communists were expelled from Montenegro until spring 1943.

=== A split between the insurgents ===
A split developed between the insurgents was a result of their defeats inflicted by the Italians and realization by some of them that the uprising was led by the communists. Partisans were determined to carry on with the communist revolution while nationalists recognized that the uprising had been defeated and wanted to stop fighting. In northern Montenegro, there was a particular distinction between communists and nationalists. The communists wanted to continue with the revolution by turning against their class enemies. The focus of the nationalists was to avoid provoking the Italians but to protect the mountain villages if they were attacked. During the autumn, the nationalists contacted the Italians and offered to assist them to fight the Partisans. Subsequently, the nationalists, including Đurišić who was popular in his own Vasojević clan of northern Montenegro, withdrew into the hinterland. Most nationalist commanders took neither side in the sporadic clashes between Italian forces and insurgent forces that became increasingly dominated by Partisans.

There were two main reasons for the expansion of the conflict between the two groups of insurgents: a major defeat of Partisan forces during their attack on the Italian garrison in Pljevlja and terror conducted by communists, the so-called "Left Deviations". "A land without Chetniks was suddenly overwhelmed by Chetniks" largely due to the policy of Left Deviations which resulted in a temporary defeat of the Partisan movement in Montenegro in 1942. The general uprising of the people of Montenegro became a civil war.

== End of uprising ==
In early November 1941 Tito dismissed Milovan Đilas from the command of Partisan forces in Montenegro because of his mistakes during the uprising, including his "Leftist Errors". Tito emphasized that Đilas made mistakes because he organized a frontal struggle of armies against a much stronger enemy instead of connecting the Partisan struggle with the people's uprising and adopting the partisan methods of resistance. Đilas was appointed as editor of the paper Borba, the Party's main propaganda organ.

The uprising continued to a reduced extent until December 1941.

== Aftermath ==
The population of Serbia also turned against the uprising and communist insurgents because of their repression and intention to carry on a communist revolution. The Partisans moved from Serbia to Bosnia (nominally NDH) and joined their comrades who had already left Montenegro. Together, they made up the First Proletarian Brigade established by Tito on 21 December 1941, in Rudo, southeastern Bosnia.

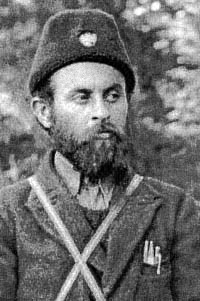
Pavle Đurišić

On 20 December 1941, Draža Mihailović, a prominent Chetnik leader later supported by the Yugoslav government-in-exile, appointed Đurišić as the commander of all regular and reserve troops in central and eastern Montenegro and parts of the Sandžak. On 21 December 1941, the Italians declared that they would hold Montenegro responsible if their troops were attacked again. In the second half of December 1941, Đurišić and Lašić began the mobilization and establishment of armed units separated from Partisans. By the middle of January 1942 these units were in armed conflict with Partisans. On 12 January 1942, the Italians specified how they intended to punish the Montenegrins in case of attack on Italian forces: 50 civilians would be executed for every killed or wounded Italian officer. In the case of regular soldiers, 10 civilians would be killed. Biroli was proclaimed a war criminal because of the crimes committed by the Italian forces commanded by him in Montenegro. In February 1942, the Italians estimated that there were about 8,000 Partisans and 5,000 Chetniks operating in Montenegro.

In early March 1942, Đurišić arranged one of the first collaboration agreements between the Italians and the Chetniks. This agreement was with Biroli, and related to the area of operations of the 19th Infantry Division Venezia. In May 1942, Đurišić attacked and defeated the last significant Partisan detachment in Montenegro. Partisan forces were pushed out from most of Montenegro. As they retreated, they pillaged and burned villages that did not support them. The towns remained under Italian occupation while Chetniks were allowed to control the rest of Montenegro. The Partisans retreated from Montenegro and joined other Partisans in Bosnia. Except for some individuals and small underground units, Partisans did not re-enter Montenegro for almost a year.

Following the withdrawal of the Partisans from Montenegro, the Chetniks repeated the same mistakes the Partisans had made, establishing prison camps, conducting show trials and killing indiscriminately. These actions were not just targeted at the remaining communists, but also against the Sandzak Muslims. Chetnik massacres of Muslims were perpetrated in particular in the towns of Bijelo Polje, Pljevlja and the village of Bukovica. This resulted in the Muslims establishing village militias to defend against both the Partisans and Chetniks.

== See also ==
- Statehood Day (Montenegro)
- Uprising in Serbia (1941)

== Sources ==
Books

- Brajović, Petar (1963). Rapports au 3e Congrès international sur l'histoire de la résistance européenne à Karlovy Vary, les 2–4 septembre 1963. Institut pour l'étude du mouvement ouvrier.
- Burgwyn, H. James (2005). Empire On The Adriatic: Mussolini's Conquest Of Yugoslavia 1941–1943. Enigma Books. ISBN 978-1-929631-35-3.
- Caccamo, Francesco; Monzali, Luciano (2008). L'occupazione italiana della Iugoslavia, 1941–1943 (in Italian). Florence, Italy: Le Lettere. ISBN 978-88-6087-113-8.
- Cox, John K. (2002). The History of Serbia. Greenwood Publishing Group. ISBN 978-0-313-31290-8.
- Dedijer, Vladimir (1990). From April 6, 1941, to November 27, 1942. University of Michigan Press. ISBN 978-0-472-10091-0.
- Đilas, Milovan (1980). Wartime. Translated by Michael B. Petrovich. New York: Houghton Mifflin Harcourt. ISBN 978-0-15-694712-1.
- Irvine, Jill A. (1993). The Croat Question: Partisan Politics in the Formation of the Yugoslav Socialist State. Westview Press. ISBN 978-0-8133-8542-6.
- Karchmar, Lucien (1987). Draža Mihailović and the Rise of the Četnik Movement, 1941–1945. New York: Garland Publishing. ISBN 978-0-8240-8027-3.
- Lampe, John R. (2000). Yugoslavia as History: Twice There Was a Country. Cambridge University Press. ISBN 978-0-521-77401-7.
- Milazzo, Matteo J. (1975). The Chetnik Movement & the Yugoslav Resistance. Baltimore, Maryland: Johns Hopkins University Press. ISBN 978-0-8018-1589-8.
- Milovanović, Nikola B. (1984). Kontrarevolucionarni pokret Draže Mihailovića. Izdavačka radna organizacija "Rad".
- Morrison, Kenneth (2009). Montenegro: a modern history. I.B. Tauris. ISBN 978-1-84511-710-8.
- Pajović, Radoje (1987). Pavle Đurišić (in Serbo-Croatian). Zagreb, Yugoslavia: Centar za informacije i publicitet. ISBN 978-86-7125-006-1.
- Pavlowitch, Stevan K. (2002). Serbia: The History behind the Name. London: Hurst & Company. ISBN 978-1850654773.
- Pavlowitch, Stevan K. (2007). Hitler's New Disorder: The Second World War in Yugoslavia. New York: Columbia University Press. ISBN 978-1-85065-895-5.
- Petacco, Arrigo (2003). Egzodus: zanijekana tragedija Talijana Istre, Dalmacije i Julijske Krajine (in Serbo-Croatian). Durieux. ISBN 978-953-188-171-5.
- Petranović, Branko (1992). Srbija u drugom svetskom ratu: 1939–1945. Vojnoizdavaćki i Novinski Centar.
- Ramet, Sabrina P. (2006). The Three Yugoslavias: State-Building and Legitimation, 1918–2005. Bloomington, Indiana: Indiana University Press. ISBN 978-0-253-34656-8.
- Roberts, Walter R. (1987). Tito, Mihailović, and the Allies, 1941–1945. Duke University Press. ISBN 0-8223-0773-1.
- Rodogno, Davide (2006). Fascism's European Empire: Italian Occupation During the Second World War. Cambridge University Press. ISBN 978-0-521-84515-1.
- Tomasevich, Jozo (1975). War and Revolution in Yugoslavia, 1941–1945: The Chetniks. Stanford, California: Stanford University Press. ISBN 978-0-8047-0857-9.
- Tomašević, Jozo (1979). Četnici u Drugom svjetskom ratu: 1941–1945 (in Serbo-Croatian). Sveučilišna naklada Liber.
- Tomasevich, Jozo (2001). War and Revolution in Yugoslavia, 1941–1945: Occupation and Collaboration. Stanford, California: Stanford University Press. ISBN 978-0-8047-3615-2.
- Živković, Milutin D. (2017). Санџак 1941–1943 [Sandžak 1941–1943] (Doctoral) (in Serbo-Croatian). Belgrade: University of Belgrade. OCLC 1242119546.

Websites

- Pajović, Radoje (13 July 2013). "Ustanak koji nikada nije ugušen" [The uprising which was never suppressed]. Vijesti (in Serbian). Podgorica, Montenegro. Archived from the original on 2 May 2014.
