= Lukovo, Nikšić =

Lukovo Луково
- Village
- Location within Montenegro
- Coordinates: 42.807982°N 19.016176°E
- Country: Montenegro
- Municipality: Nikšić

Population (2011)
  - Total: 307
- Time zone: UTC+1 (CET)
  - Summer (DST): UTC+2 (CEST)

Lukovo (Serbian Cyrillic: Луково) is a village in the municipality of Nikšić, Montenegro.

== Demographics ==
According to the 2011 census, its population was 307.

Ethnicity in 2011
| Ethnicity | Number | Percentage |
|---|---|---|
| Montenegrins | 169 | 55.0% |
| Serbs | 117 | 38.1% |
| other/undeclared | 21 | 6.8% |
| Total | 307 | 100% |
