= Ćazim Sijarić =

Muslim war commander

- Qazim Sijari
- Died: 1945
- Military career
- Allegiance: Germany; Italy; Albania
- Conflicts: World War II in Yugoslavia

Ćazim Sijarić (Albanian: Qazim Sijari(q)) was a commander of a detachment of Muslim militia from Bijelo Polje County (in Sandžak) during the Second World War. Seat of Sijarić's detachment was in village of Godijeva, and units were deployed in multiple villages, as well as in Bijelo Polje. Sijarić was one of the commanders of the Muslim militia, who was especially in favor of the annexation of the eastern part of Sandzak into the Kingdom of Albania.

Moslem militia in Bijelo Polje County was founded by Ćazim Sijarić, Vehbo Bučan and Galjan Lukač. It was under control of Italian division Venezia. A deputy of Sijarić was Smajo Trubljanin. On May 19, 1942 Sijarić's and Bučan's forces attacked Chetniks of Rade Korda in villages of Zahumska, Vrbica and Tutiće. During attack Muslim Militia razed and robbed 15 houses including cattle, before attack was repelled by Chetniks. One woman and one Chetnik died during attack. With other commanders of Muslim militia (including Osman Rastoder, Sulejman Pačariz, and Husein Rovčanin) Sijarić participated in a conference in village of Godijeva, and agreed to attack Serb villages near Sjenica and other parts of Sandžak. Following conference in Godijeva on December 30 Sijarić lead an attack on village of Buđevo as a first step towards destruction of Serb villages in the region. Buđevo was partially burnt down, but attack ultimately failed. Following fighting at Buđevo strategy of joint Muslim Militia attacks against Serbs villages failed. In early January 1943 the unit under command of Sijarić distinguished itself during attack of Chetniks led by Pavle Đurišić. In November 1943 German Hauptsturmführer Karl von Krempler ordered Muslims and Chetniks in Sandžak to cease their hostilities and to cooperate united under the German command. On 15 November he ordered to Sijarić to establish communication with local Chetnik detachments, as well as to end pillaging and attacks on Serb villages and return stolen livestock, and together with them and Muslim militia commanded by Galijan, to attack communist forces in Bijelo Polje. On 17 November Sijarić replied to Krempler informing him that he intend to follow his orders.

== Sources ==
- Živković, Milutin (2017). Санџак 1941-1943(Sandžak 1943-1943). Belgrade: University of Belgrade.
