= Hasan Zvizdić =

Bosniak commander

Hasan Zvizdić Agha
- Born: 1892; Sjenica, Ottoman Empire (modern Serbia)
- Died: 1980 (aged 87–88); Adapazarı, Turkey
- Military career
- Allegiance: Independent State of Croatia; Kingdom of Italy; Nazi Germany; Kingdom of Albania
- Unit: detachment of Sandžak Muslim militia from Sjenica
- Conflicts: World War II in Yugoslavia: Battle of Sjenica

Hasan Zvizdić (1892–1980) was a Sandžak Muslim commander of a detachment of the collaborationist Muslim militia from Sjenica during the Second World War. He was the main livestock wholesaler in the region which depended on animal husbandry, thus his influence in Sandžak was strong.

== Early life ==
Zvizdić was born into a prominent Bosniak noble family that originally came from Gacko in Eastern Herzegovina (Bosnia and Herzegovina). In 1917 the house of his family was attacked by Serb resistance who killed his mother and two sisters while his father and many other family members were wounded. This event had a significant influence on his later political and military career. In 1917 he became a member of council of Zeta Banovina.

Zvizdić was a wealthy Muslim whole-trader in Sjenica. He became a city governor and armed many local Muslims organizing them as militia during the war.

== During World War II ==
In December 1941 Zvizdić refused to allow Partisans to capture Sjenica because he was afraid that Chetniks, German and Italian forces would attack Partisans in Sjenica and kill many of its population as well. He explained to Partisans that he had around 5,000 members of Muslim militia under his command and that he would use them against Partisans or Chetniks if they tried to capture Sjenica. According to historian Živković, Zvizdić was actually concerned that his lucrative contracts to supply Italian and German army with livestock would be cancelled if Partisans captured the city.

On 22 December 1941 forces of Muslim militia from Prijepolje, commanded by Sulejman Pačariz, and from Sjenica commanded by Zvizdić successfully repelled the attack of Partisans who tried to capture Sjenica. They were supported by one company from Tutin, commanded by Džemail Koničanin, who joined them based on invitation of Zvizdić. Under orders from Italians, Zvizdić sent them Partisan PoWs through Sulejman Pačariz to Prijepolje, 17 of them would be executed by Italians and 4 exchanged with partisans.

At the beginning of February 1942 detachments of Muslim militia from Sjenica under command of Zvizdić, together with Prijepolje, Brodarevo and Komaran militia detachments in cooperation with Chetniks under command of Pavle Đurišić and with Italian forces, were planned to attack Partisans who were retreating through Sandžak after their defeat in Užice. When Pačariz realized that Partisans managed to defeat Chetniks, he did not dare to attack Partisans, but decided to move his forces to Sjenica to help Zvizdić in case Partisans decide to attack the town again.

Zvizdić was very influential not only in Sjenica and Tutin, but also in wider region. He thought that it is useful to visit Chetnik headquarter and to negotiate with Draža Mihailović. On 27 June Zvizdić and other Muslim and Albanian leaders (including Aćif Hadžiahmetović, Xhafer Deva, Ferhat Bey Draga and Ahmet Daca) negotiated with representatives of Mihailović's Chetniks. The negotiations ended with agreement on cooperation in the joint struggle against Communists. Milorad Ekmečić refer to Zvizdić as Muslim Chetnik leader. In 1943 Zvizvić organized revenge to Serbs that killed members of his family, with support of Muslims from Kladnica. Zvizdić was one of the commanders of the Muslim militia, who was especially in favor of the annexation of the eastern part of Sandžak into the Kingdom of Albania.

Karl von Krempler planned to establish Sandžak as separate political entity and offered to Zvizdić a position of its governor. Zvizdić refused Krempler's offer. When Germans took control over Montenegro after the capitulation of Italy at the end of 1943 they established a puppet Government with Hasan Zvizdić as its minister without portfolio.

After the war he emigrated from Yugoslavia to avoid being captured and executed by Partisans. He died in 1980 in Adapazarı, Turkey. In 2012 a commemorative plaque was revealed in front of the house in which Zvizdić lived.

== Sources ==
- Crnovršanin, Harun (1996). Sinovi Sandžaka. Izd. autora.
- Živković, Milutin (2011). "Dešavanja u Sandžaku od julskog ustanka do kraja 1941 godine" (PDF). Baština (in Serbian). 31. Priština, Leposavić: Institute for Serbian Culture.
- Живковић, Милутин Д. (2017). Санџак 1941–1943. Филозофски Фалултет, Универзитет у Београду.
