= Džemail Koničanin =

Albanian collaborationist militia commander

- Xhemail Koniçani
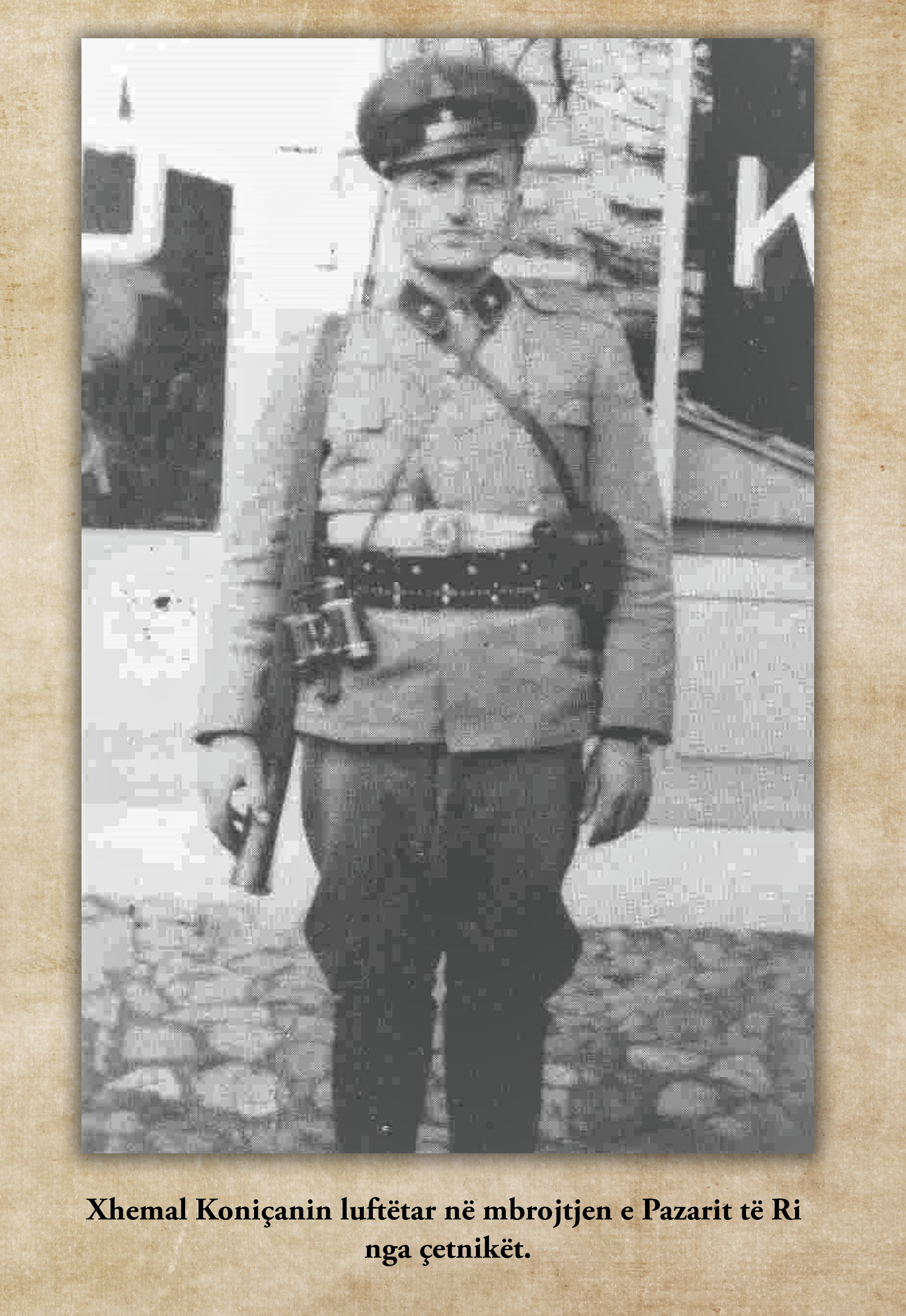
- Born: 1910; Koniče, Tutin, Ottoman Empire (modern-day Serbia)
- Died: 23 June 1944 (aged 33–34)
- Military career
- Allegiance: Germany
- Nicknames: Džemo, Gazija
- Conflicts: World War II in Yugoslavia; Battle for Novi Pazar; Battle of Sjenica

Džemail Koničanin (Albanian: Xhemail Koniçani), also known as Džemo (Albanian: Xhemo) (1910–1944), was an Albanian military commander of the detachment of Sandžak Muslim militia established in Tutin during the Second World War.

== Life ==
In October 1941, frequent clashes happened between Chetniks and Albanian and Muslim militias. Koničanin's group repelled Chetnik attack on the village of Požega near Novi Pazar. In November Koničanin participated in the battle against Chetniks who tried to capture Novi Pazar. Together with forces of Mulla Jakup and Bilall Dreshaj, his forces attacked the rear flanks of Chetniks and caused their dismay and retreat. Based on the Hadžiahmetovićs instructions he went to Sjenica to gather additional support in men, arms and ammunition for a planned attack on Raška.

In December 1941, based on the invitation of Hasan Zvizdić, Koničanin brought a company of Muslims from Tutin to Sjenica to participate in the struggle against Partisans who tried to capture Sjenica. Koničanin's men defeated one(of 3) column of Sjenica Partisan Company, who they either captured or executed. Because of his military achievements during Battles of Novi Pazar and Sjenica, local population nicknamed him 'Gazija'. One of Koničanin's important roles was his cooperation with SS Polizei-Selbstschutz-Regiment Sandschak.

Koničanin commanded Muslim forces that burned the village Šavci near Novi Pazar.

Koničanin commanded Muslim forces that burned the Serbian village Šavci near Novi Pazar and killed serb in saronje. Konicanin burned the Serbian village gracane near manastir sopocani.

Koničanin was killed during an attack against Partisans on 23 June 1944.

== Sources ==
- Ćuković, Mirko (1964). Sandžak. Nolit-Prosveta.
- Živković, Milutin D. (2017). Санџак 1941–1943 [Sandžak 1941–1943] (Doctoral) (in Serbo-Croatian). Belgrade: University of Belgrade. OCLC 1242119546.
