= Bukovica massacre =

1943 massacre in Montenegro

Battle of Bukovica
- Part of World War II in Yugoslavia
| Date | 4–7 February 1943 |
| Location | Bukovica, Pljevlja, Italian governorate of Montenegro (modern day Montenegro) |
| Result | Chetnik victory |
| Territorial changes | After the short battle, Bukovica came under Chetnik control |

Belligerents
| Sandžak Muslim militia | Chetniks |

Commanders and leaders
| Latif Močević; Alija Hadžimusić † | Pavle Đurišić |

Units involved
| Bukovica detachment; Foča detachment | Mileševa Corps; Drina Corps; Durmitor Brigade |

Strength
| 2,500 | 3,550 |

Casualties and losses
- more than 576 civilians

The Bukovica massacre was a massacre of Muslims in Bukovica, Pljevlja, in the Axis-occupied Italian governorate of Montenegro. It took place on 4–7 February 1943, during Pavle Đurišić's Chetniks' 1943 cleansing campaign (conducted against the order of supreme Chetnik command). The massacre was aimed at establishing Chetnik control over territories held by the Sandžak Muslim militia. After a short battle with the Muslim militia, Chetniks captured Bukovica and killed over five hundred civilians.

== Background ==
=== Geography and demography ===
Bukovica is a rural area of Pljevlja municipality located in northern Montenegro, and is part of the Sandžak region. Prior to the start of World War II, the population of Bukovica was predominantly Muslim, with a substantial Serb population.

=== Muslim militia in Sandžak ===
At the end of April 1941 and into the beginning of May, Croatian Ustaše forces captured Sandžak. Political representatives of the Muslim population requested that the territory of Sandžak should be annexed by the Independent State of Croatia. Thus the Sandžak Muslim militia was established in all regions of Sandžak, including Pljevlja. After withdrawal of the Ustaše from Sandžak in September 1941, the region came under control of Italian forces as part of Italian governorate of Montenegro. In April 1942, Italians established a battalion of Muslim militia in Metaljka, near Čajniče, composed of about 500 Muslims from villages near Pljevlja and Čajniče. Soon after, a command post of Muslim militia was established in Bukovica, near Pljevlja. It was commanded by Latif Moćević, the president of Bukovica municipality. From the end of May 1942, his units attacked and killed local Serbs.

In December 1942, around 3,000 Muslims attacked the Serbian village of Buđevo and several surrounding villages near Sjenica, burning down Serb houses and murdering Serb civilians. According to Chetnik sources, Muslims were preparing to expel Serbs who lived on the right bank of Lim, Pljevlja, Čajniče, and Foča.

=== Order of Draža Mihailović ===
On 3 January 1943 Draža Mihailović issued an order for the "cleansing of Ustaše-Muslim organizations" from Čajniče region with the explanation that Ustaše and Sandžak Muslim militia forces had continued to attack and kill Serb civilians, rob Serb-populated villages and rape women and girls. Stating that the total number of their armed forces was 2,500, Mihailović issued his order to:

- Mileševa Corps, commanded by Vojislav Lukačević and Railić Radoman,
- Drina Corps, commanded by Bajo Nikič
- Durmitor brigade, commanded by Nikola Bojović

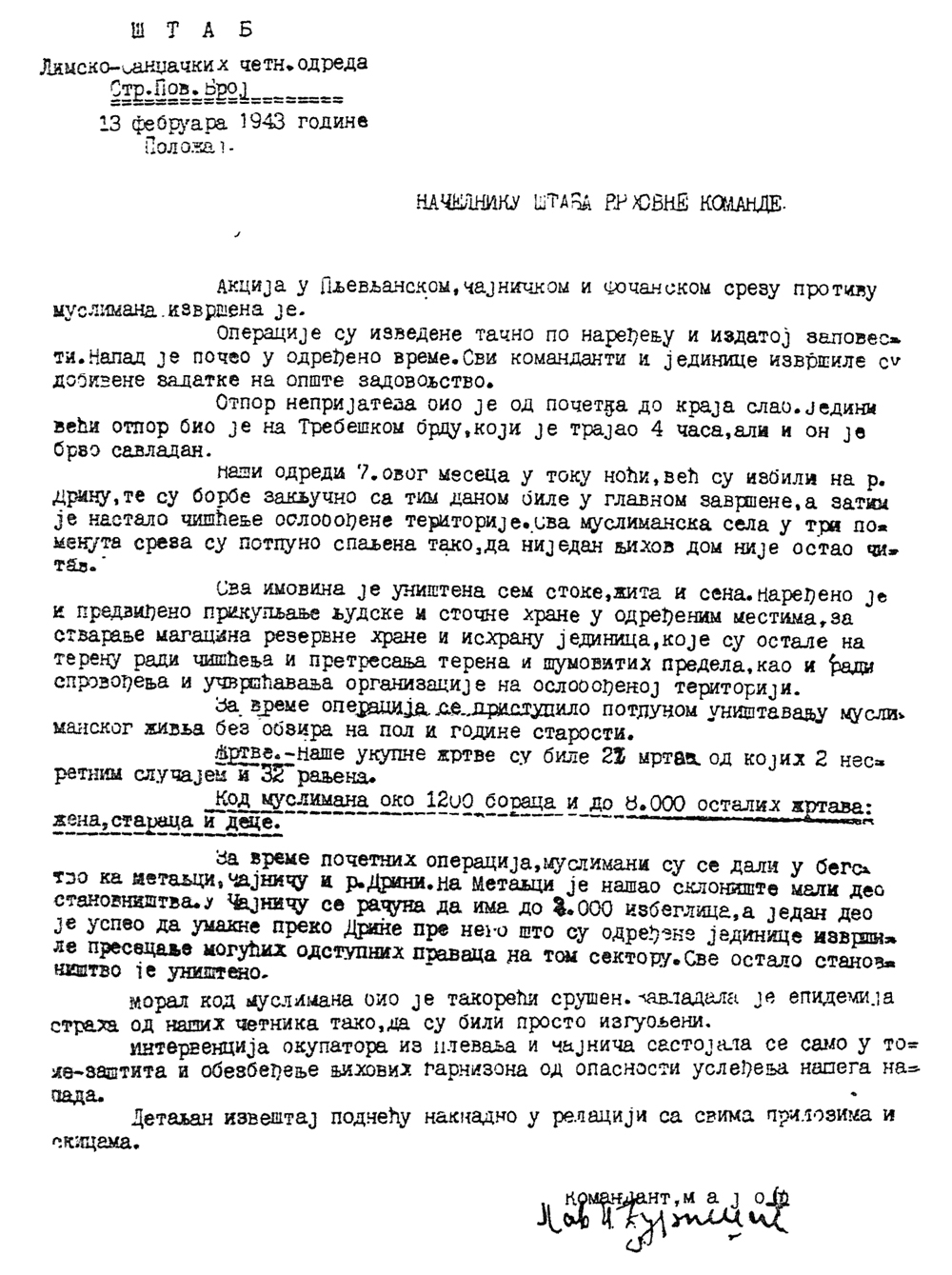
Đurišić's report of 13 February 1943 informing Mihailović of the massacres of Muslims in the counties of Čajniče and Foča in southeastern Bosnia and in the county of Pljevlja in the Sandžak.

=== Đurišić's January raids of revenge ===
On 5 January 1943 Montenegrin Chetniks, commanded by Pavle Đurišić, attacked 33 villages predominantly populated with Muslims in the region of Lower Bihor. They pursued raids of revenge against Sandžak Muslims, many being innocent villagers, with the goal of settling accounts with Muslim militias.

A group commanded by Lukačević began their attack on 5 January 1943. As soon as they attacked, Italian forces tried to intervene. On the same day a unit commanded by Rade Korda burned 15 houses and killed 15 people. The unit commanded by Miraš Savić began to attack on 6 January. On 10 January, Đurišić reported that the Chetniks under his command had burned down 33 Muslim villages, killed 400 Muslim fighters, and had also killed about 1,000 Muslim women and children in the region of Bjelo Polje.

According to some sources, Italians wanted to reward Chetniks because they had agreed to participate in the Case White operation against Communists. This allowed Chetnik attacks on the Muslim population to occur in Sandžak and Montenegro. Chetnik forces began with preparation for this attack on 1 February 1943.

At the end of January 1943, Muslims from Kalinovik in eastern Herzegovina advised Muslims from Bukovica not to allow communists to misuse them against Serbs, like Ustaše had misused them in 1942. This advice was not followed and some Muslims from this region continued to terrorize Serbs from Bukovica and neighboring places.

After a short battle with Muslim militia, Bukovica fell under Chetnik control.

== Casualties ==
An incomplete list of 576 victims of the Chetnik attack on Bukovica municipality was published in Prilog u krvi Pljevlja 1941–45.godine (1969) by the SUBNOR (Union of Veterans of the People's Liberation War). 443 of the listed victims were children under the age of 18. Many of the men escaped, believing that civilian villages would not be in danger. Many civilians were tortured before being killed; a number of women and girls were raped. According to an incomplete list, Chetniks burned 1,171 houses and 468 other buildings. On 1 March 1943 Latif Močević sent a report to the 1st Alpine Division Taurinense, informing them about this massacre. He stated that the number of victims in Bukovica was about 500 civilians, including 81 child in only one village - Močevići. In his testimony he said that Chetniks made a toilet from the corpses, which they named Muslim Mosque. Chetniks also threw Muslims regardless of age or gender into Ćehotina river, raped girls and then killed them with stakes through their 'private parts' and they tore skin off someone named Hadžija Tahirović from below the knees than up the backs and then the skin was pulled back down the chest. Last brutal act Chetniks called Muslim women with a burqa.

The Chetniks killed Pavle Đurković, a notable person from Bukovica, because he was opposed to the massacre of Muslims.

On 16 February 1943 Ustaše reported to their ministry of external affairs that Latif Močević, a detachment commander of Muslim militia from Bukovica, and some other militia members were captured by Italians in Čajniče. According to this report, Alija Hadžimusić, a commander of Foča detachment of Muslim militia, was killed in the battle near Čajniče. Ustaše reported that the Muslim militia was surrounded near Čajniče, with insufficient ammunition, being "on the edge of annihilation."

== Aftermath ==
On 28 February 1943 there was a conference in Prijepolje attended by Italian Lieutenant General Luigi Mentasti, who was commander of Italian forces in Montenegro. Mentasti asserted that Italian forces were not responsible for the Bukovica massacre, citing the centuries-long conflict between Orthodox Christians and Muslims. In turn, one million Serbs were murdered on the territory of the Independent State of Croatia which included Bosnia and Hercegovina. He also accused the population of Bukovica of providing haven to a communist agent, an accusation that was denied by the mufti Šećerkadić from Pljevlja. Mentasti explained that Italian forces could not guarantee the security of Muslims in Pljevlja and recommended that they follow the example of Muslims from Berane and Bijelo Polje who signed agreements with Pavle Đurišić and Chetnik General Đukanović.

During the war, communists established a commission for the investigation of war crimes of occupying forces and their collaborators. After the war, this commission investigated the massacre committed by Chetniks in villages of the Pljevlja municipality and emphasized that it was committed by Chetniks commanded by Draža Mihajlović and his subordinate officers with the approval of the commander of the 1st Alpine Division Taurinense. This commission composed a list of 95 Muslims and 59 Orthodox Christian war criminals in Pljevlja during the war. Seventeen former Chetniks were accused of committing the Bukovica massacre.

== Sources ==
Books

- Dedijer, Vladimir; Miletić, Antun (1990). Genocid nad Muslimanima, 1941-1945. Svjetlost. ISBN 9788601015258.
- Čekić, Smail (1996). Genocid nad Bošnjacima u Drugom svjetskom ratu: dokumenti. Udruženje Muslimana za antigenocidne aktivnosti.
- IIRPS (1972). NOR i revolucija u Srbiji, 1941–1945: naučni skup posvećen 30-godišnjici ustanka, održan na Zlatiboru 25–26 septembra 1971. Institut za istoriju radničkog pokreta Srbije (IIRPS).
- Knežević, Danilo (1969). Prilog u krvi: Pljevlja 1941–1945. Opštinski odbor SUBNOR-a.
- Vasović, Milorad S. (2009). Istorija Pljevlja. Opština Pljevlja. ISBN 978-9940-512-03-3.
- Pajović, Radoje (1977). Kontrarevolucija u Crnoj Gori: Četnički i federalistički pokret, 1941–1945 [The Counter-revolution in Montenegro: The Chetnik and Federalist Movements, 1941–1945] (in Serbo-Croatian). Cetinje: Obod. OCLC 5351995.
- Petrović, Milić F. (2009). "Nacionalni Pokreti u Pljevaljskom Kraju 1941-1945". Istorija Pljevalja. Opština Pljevalja.
- Redžić, Vučeta (2002). Građanski rat u Crnoj Gori: Dešavanja od sredine 1942. godine do sredine 1945. godine. Stupovi.

Documents

- HLC (10 February 2003). Bukovica (PDF). HLC. ISBN 86-82599-39-2. Archived from the original (PDF) on 19 January 2012.
