= Rade Korda =

- Раде Корда
- Born: Tutiće village in Bijelo Polje county (present-day Sjenica county)
- Died: April 1945; Bosnia
- Military career
- Allegiance: Kingdom of Yugoslavia
- Rank: Sergeant (gendarmerie); Voivode (Chetniks)
- Unit: The Giljeva Chetnik Detachment
- Conflicts: World War II; Uprising in Montenegro

Rade Korda (Serbian Cyrillic: Раде Корда), or Rade Kordić (Serbian Cyrillic: Раде Кордић), was a Serb gendarmerie sergeant and Chetnik commander (vojvoda, војвода) in the Bijelo Polje region (present-day Montenegro) in occupied Yugoslavia during World War II. After the Sandžak Muslim militia burned houses of Serbs living in villages around Giljeva mountain during the July 1941 uprising in Montenegro, Korda became involved in a struggle with Muslims. He became an influential Chetnik commander in the regions of Bijelo Polje and Sjenica, which opposed the Chetniks' anticommunist policy.

Korda was nominally under the Chetnik command from Nova Varoš and Major Glišić until 1943 (when he came under the command of Pavle Đurišić), but was an independent commander of Chetnik forces from Serb villages between Bijelo Polje and Sjenica. The Giljeva Chetnik Detachment, established and commanded by Korda, had 300–600 men.

== Early life and military rank ==
Korda was born in Tutiće village in Bijelo Polje county and completed elementary school. Before World War II, he was a police sergeant.

== World War II ==
=== Chetniks in Serbia ===
At the beginning of World War II in Yugoslavia, Korda organized and led a detachment of Serbs in Bare (near Sjenica) to protect their villages from newly-established pro-Croat and pro-Albanian authorities in Sjenica under the command of Major Miloš Glišić. His authority was recognized by the Government of National Salvation in Serbia, to whom he reported on 26 April that his attempts to establish good relations with Muslims failed; they had killed one of his men the day before.

During the 1941 uprising in Montenegro, Korda was a commander of the rebel forces. At the beginning of September 1941 Korda killed Šukra Pilica, commander of Muslim militia in the hamlet of Zaklopača in Bare, Sjenica.

In November 1941, after the rebellion was suppressed, Korda was elected regional commander and later established and commanded the Giljevo Chetnik Detachment. During November there was heavy fighting between Korda's and local Muslim troops. On November 11, Italians noted than houses were burnt down, 600 people lost their homes and significant destruction of crops. According to some sources, Korda received the rank of Chetnik voivode. On February 23, Korda started revenge and robbery attack on Muslim village Borišiće. All 24 houses in the village were razed and 8 villagers were killed. In April 1942, the Muslim militia from Bijelo Polje repeatedly attacked forces under Korda; he did not respond to the attacks, in accordance with an order from Major Glišić in Raška (under whose command he was at the time). Korda's troops in villages of Zahumsko, Vrbnica and Tutiće were attacked on May 19 and in Korito on May 22 by Muslim Militia, but Chetniks successfully repelled these attacks.

According to some Yugoslav postwar sources, Korda was not fully under Chetnik control because he fought against Balli Kombetar, Sandžak Muslim militia, partisans and the Chetniks. He controlled several small villages from a headquarters in a cave near a hilltop. Some sources say that Korda opposed to Chetniks' anticommunist policy, and Axis occupation forces in Montenegro blamed him for protecting communists in his region. His conflicts with Pavle Đurišić and other Chetnik commanders in the region made central control of Chetnik units in Montenegro impossible. Korda reported on 3 June 1942 that a delegation from Chetnik headquarters in Bijelo Polje asked him to come under the command of Pavle Đurišić, which he refused to do for the next several months.

The behavior or many independent Chetnik leaders in the region (including Korda's abruptness) gave the region's population a negative impression of the movement. According to some documents, Draža Mihailović ordered Korda's execution because of his refusal to subordinate himself to the Chetnik command; however, Korda avoided death by participating in the actions organized against the occupying Axis forces and Muslims. Control of Bijelo Polje and Korda were factors in the conflict between Pavle Đurišić and Miloš Glišić.

=== Chetniks in Montenegro ===
After Miloš Glišić and his Chetniks were expelled from Nova Varoš, Korda was under the command of Pavle Đurišić; however, he independently controlled Serb villages on the border between Bijelo Polje and Sjenica. Đurišić appointed Korda commander of the 2nd Bijelo Polje brigade of the 150-man Lim-Sandžak Chetnik Detachment. According to published Chetnik postwar sources, Đurišić appointed Radenko Tmušić as Korda's assistant after Korda asked him for a professional military officer.

Korda was one of the Chetnik commanders who participated in Đurišić's reprisals against Sandžak Muslims (many of whom were innocent), originally intended as revenge against the Sandžak Muslim militia. A group commanded by Vojislav Lukačević began with an attack on 5 January 1943. When the Chetniks began the offensive, Italian forces tried to reach Korda with a plea to stop the attacks but were driven off. A unit commanded by Korda burned 15 houses and killed 15 people that day, and Miraš Savić's unit began its attack the following day. Korda's men tried to take village of Resova, where many Muslim refugees were sheltered, however due to strong Italian and Muslim crew in the village attack was easily repelled.

In February 1943 Italians warned Korda to stop disrupting peace, as he was seen as one of the main troublemakers in the region alongside Osman Rastoder. Italian forces attacked Korda's men in the village of Tocilovo (near Brodarevo), killing five Chetniks and capturing Korda's sister and niece on 12 June 1943. The Italian 2nd Battalion of the 83rd Regiment from Bijelo Polje organized a mop-up operation of Korda's region, probably at the request of local Muslims, on 25 June. The 60-man of Giljevo Chetnik Detachment ambushed the Italian soldiers (supported by the Sandžak Muslim Militia) near the village of Radijelje, but had to retreat after five Chetniks were killed and four captured by the Italians. The Italians captured arms and ammunition, inflicting a heavy blow on Korda's group.

In the Klisura region of, 25 km southeast of Sjenica, a joint force of the Sandžak Muslim militia and a bicycle unit of the 104th Jäger Division fought Korda's Chetniks. As part of a wider action to destroy the Chetniks in Montenegro, German and Italian forces (supported by the Sandžak Muslim militia) captured the region controlled by Korda's Giljevo Chetnik Detachment at the end of June 1943; dozens of Chetniks and Serb civilians were killed. After initial resistance, Korda and the Chetniks retreated across the river Lim.

== In popular culture ==
Poetry such as "Three thousand with black beards led by Korda Rade" (Serbian: Три хиљаде црне браде и пред њима Корда Раде) has been written in honor of Korda, sometimes accompanied by a gusle.

== Sources ==
- Aćin-Kosta, Miloš (1980). Draža Mihailović i Ravna Gora: Na oštrici hakenkrojca i srpa.
- Ćuković, Mirko (1964). Sandžak. Nolit-Prosveta.
- Dedijer, Vladimir; Miletić, Antun (1990). Genocid nad Muslimanima, 1941-1945. Svjetlost. ISBN 9788601015258.
- Glasnik Srpskog istorijsko-kulturnog društva "Njegoš" [Gazette of the Serbian Historical and Cultural Society "Njegoš"]. Njegoš. 1958.
- Institut (1986). Zbornik dokumenata i podataka o narodnooslobodilačkom ratu naroda Jugoslavija (in Serbian). Vojnoistorijski institut.
- Kordić, Mile (2001). Manita zemlja Srbija. Knjiga-Komerc.
- Živković, Milutin D. (2017). Санџак 1941–1943 [Sandžak 1941–1943] (Doctoral) (in Serbo-Croatian). Belgrade: University of Belgrade. OCLC 1242119546.
