= Husein Rovčanin =

Sandžak Muslim militia leader

- Born: 1907; Brodarevo, Sanjak of Novi Pazar, Kosovo Vilayet, Ottoman Empire (today the Sandžak region, Serbia)
- Died: April 26, 1944 (aged 36–37); Bukovik, Partisan-controlled Sandžak (modernday Serbia)
- Military career
- Allegiance: Croatia; Italy; Germany
- Rank: Captain
- Unit: Detachment of Sandžak Muslim militia from Komaran (Brodarevo in Sandžak)
- Conflicts: World War II in Yugoslavia

Husein Rovčanin (1907 – 26 April 1944 (Note: Other source claims that Rovčanin died in December 1944)) was a commander of a detachment of Sandžak Muslim militia from Komaran (Brodarevo in Sandžak) during the Second World War.

== World War II ==
When Axis forces occupied Yugoslavia in April 1941, Ustaše forces of the Independent State of Croatia occupied Sandžak and established detachments of Muslim militia. Rovčanin was a commander of a detachment of Sandžak Muslim militia from Komaran (Brodarevo in Sandžak). After Ustaše were forced to retreat from Sandžak, Rovčanin and his unit started working with Italian occupier. His unit had about 300 men, half of which weren't reported to Italians. Apart from his large salary that came from Italians, Rovčanin used his position committed acts of fraud to enrich himself. Rovčanin, along with Junković, out of Muslim Militia leaders had the best contacts with Partisans, however relations depended on Rovčanin's personal interests. Partisans were always forbidden from entering his territory, Rovčanin's troops killed Partisans and burnt down their family houses, however they would be occasionally supplied from his area of control and there were attempts to convince Rovčanin to join Partisans. Together with other commanders of Muslim militia (including Sulejman Pačariz and Osman Rastoder) he participated on the conference in village Godijevo and agreed to attack Orthodox Serb villages near Sjenica and other parts of Sandžak.

After the Capitulation of Italy in September 1943, communists tried to negotiate surrender of Rovčanin and his troops. Since Rovčanin insisted that Komaran and Brodarevo should remain under the control of his detachment of Muslim militia, negotiations failed. At the end of October 1943 Partisans captured Komaran and Rovčanin and his militia had to retreat toward Sjenica. Germans promoted him to the rank of captain. On 7 November 1943 Rovčanin led his forces of 300 — 400 militiamen from Sjenica toward Bijelo Polje. On 8 November Partisans defeated them.

Rovčanin was killed in the battle against Partisans on 26 April 1944 in the Bukovik village. Other source claims that Rovčanin died in December 1944. His militiamen wore German uniforms.

== Collaboration with Germans and cooperation with Chetnik forces ==
There are controversial interpretations of Rovčanin's role during the Second World War. According to some, he cooperated with Chetniks and died protecting the retreat of Pavle Đurišić. According to this predominantly Chetnik view, Rovčanin belonged to small group of commanders of Muslim Militia who refrained from attacks on Christian population and who pursued the policy of cooperation with Chetniks and correct attitude toward Serbs. According to this view, this policy saved lives of many civilians (both Christian and Muslim) in Brodarevo, Prijepolje and Bijelo Polje. Some postwar Chetnik sources say that Captain Rovčanin and his detachment from Komaran joined Chetniks without any conditions, and "protected their region from communists". German documents show that they indeed fought together, under German command, against Yugoslav National Liberation Army (Yugoslav Partisans).

== See also ==
- Rovca
- Rovčanin

== Sources ==
- Živković, Milutin (2017). Санџак 1941-1943 [Sanžak 1941-1943] (in Serbo-Croatian). Belgrade: University of Belgrade.
