= Muhamed Hadžiefendić =

Bosnian Muslim officer and commander of the Hadžiefendić Legion (1898-1943)

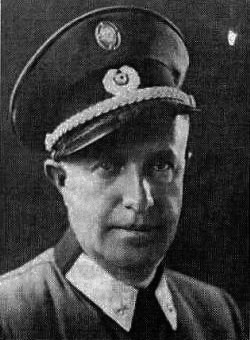
- Born: January 1898; Tuzla, Bosnia-Herzegovina, Austria-Hungary
- Died: 2 October 1943 (aged 45); Tuzla, Independent State of Croatia
- Burial place: Tuzla, Bosnia and Herzegovina
- Military career
- Allegiance: Austria-Hungary; Kingdom of Yugoslavia; Independent State of Croatia
- Branch: Austro-Hungarian Army; Royal Yugoslav Army; Croatian Home Guard
- Service years: 1914–1943
- Conflicts: World War I; World War II; Battle of Puračić (1941); Battle of Devetak (1941); Battle of Turija (1942); Operation Ozren (1942); Battle of Tuzla † (1943)

Muhamed Hadžiefendić (January 1898 – 2 October 1943) was a Bosnian Muslim officer in the Home Guard of the Independent State of Croatia during World War II, commanding the Hadžiefendić Legion.

== Life ==
Muhamed Hadžiefendić was born in Tuzla. After primary education in his hometown, he attended the Commercial Academy in Sarajevo. It was the wish of his father that he inherit and lead the family business but instead he showed more interest in pursuing a military career. During the First World War he volunteered for the Habsburg Bosnian-Herzegovinian Infantry and returned from the war with the rank of lieutenant. He succeeded his father in his commercial affairs but also continued his military training, studying emergency examinations at the Military Academy in Belgrade.

== World War II ==
In 1938 he was appointed a reserve Major in the Yugoslav Royal Army. In 1941 Axis forces invaded Yugoslavia and the Independent State of Croatia (including Bosnia) became an Axis puppet state under the control of the Ustaše.

With the formal proclamation of the Independent State of Croatia (NDH) on 10 April 1941, he returned to his native Tuzla. In December 1941 he visited the NDH Minister of the Armed Forces, Marshal Slavko Kvaternik and requested permission to create a Croatian Home Guard (Domobran) formation that would consist of Bosnian Muslims from the Tuzla area. Hadžiefendić was offered a commission as a major and was appointed to command the NDH III. 8th Battalion Infantry Regiment in Tuzla. During Chetnik attacks in early November 1941 the Home Guards of III. Battalion panicked and began to withdraw in disarray. Major Hadžiefendić restored discipline and order with a gun in his hand and the Home Guards returned to the fight, but he quickly realized that he could secure greater resolve from arming local people. Most of the Home Guard under his command were in fact conscripts from nearby Slavonia. He surmised that these Croat conscripts did not have much motivation to fight so far from their homes and that the armed forces of the NDH were not able to provide effective protection of the Bosnian Muslim population from Chetnik attacks and massacres. Therefore, on 7 December 1941, Hadžiefendić met with Kvaternik and outlined his own proposals. Kvaternik agreed with his ideas and Hadžiefendić returned to Tuzla.

On 20 December 1941 Hadžiefendić met with local mayors, representatives of the government and other prominent people to discuss forming a local volunteer force. This was formally established two days later and initially consisted of a company deployed in the villages east of Tuzla and around Živinice, which were then directly threatened by Chetnik attacks. Less than four months later in May 1942 the Volunteers Department was renamed the Hadžiefendić Legion (Hadžiefendićeva legija) and was formally recognised as a special Home Guard volunteer regiment. The regiment consisted of a headquarters in Tuzla and six battalions deployed in the cities and towns in northern Bosnia (Tuzla, Gračanica, Brčko, Bijeljina, Zvornik and Puračić). The Muslim population commonly referred to it as the Hadžiefendićeva legija, whilst the Partisans and the Chetniks called it the Muslimanska legija ("Muslim Legion"). The formation was highly motivated and fought well, but lacked weaponry and trained officers.

In 1942 Hadžiefendić was sick and spent some time recuperating in hospitals in Zagreb. He was also involved in recruiting local Muslim men into the 13th Waffen Mountain Division of the SS Handschar (1st Croatian). In March 1943, SS Standartenführer Karl von Krempler travelled to Tuzla in central Bosnia and met with Hadžiefendić, and on 28 March Hadžiefendić escorted von Krempler to Sarajevo where he introduced him to the leader of the Islamic clergy in all Bosnia, reis-ul-ulema Hafiz Muhamed Pandža, and other leading Bosnian Muslim politicians not involved with the Ustaše.

By mid-May 1943, over 6,000 members of Hadžiefendić's legion had been mustered to join SS Handschar. The Germans wished to induct Hadžiefendić into SS Handschar but their intention was never achieved. Over the period July to August 1943 there were major desertions from the Hadžiefendić legion to the Partisans, organised by Partisan spies. On 2 October 1943, Hadžiefendić and fifty-five of his men were executed by Partisans near Tuzla.
