= Rastoder =

Rastoder or Hrastoder is a Slavic surname. The bearers are predominantly Bosniaks of Montenegro and ethnic Muslims originating from Bihor, a region in northern Montenegro (Sandžak), which encompasses parts of the municipalities of Berane and Bijelo Polje.

== History ==
According to a legend, the ancestors of the Rastoder family were from Kuči. These ancestors emigrated from Kuči either in the 17th or 18th century. One part of the family went to Dupilo in Crmnica, and the other to the mountains of Plav, of which the Medunjani descend from. The family in Dupilo, because of a blood revenge (krvna osveta, or gjakmarrje), emigrated north, but a part of the family (known as the Petrović at that time) decided to stay. The descendants of these Petrovićs claim that the Metropolitan of Cetinje told them that they couldn't be known as Petrović any longer, so they instead adopted the name Hrstoderi (later Hrastoderi) because they avenged and hung a man on an oak tree (hrast), hence their surname.

Another saying, not too different from the previous one, says that the ancestors of the Rastoders emigrated to Radmanci and converted to Islam. They didn't have enough food when they arrived in Radmanci, so they peeled off the bark of oak trees (hrastovi) in order to enlarge the amount of flour for bread. It is not excluded that by that only oak valley came the surname Hrastoder.

== People ==
- Osman Rastoder, (1882–1946) Pro-Albanian Muslim religious leader and pro-Nazi collaborator. He commanded the Muslim militia in upper Bihor during the World War II occupation of Sandžak.
- Rifat Rastoder, Montenegrin Bosniak politician and deputy speaker of the Parliament of Montenegro
- Šerbo Rastoder, Montenegrin Bosniak historian and activist for Bosniak rights in Montenegro.
- Elmin Rastoder, Macedonian footballer
