= Hadžiefendić Legion =

- Active: 1941–1943
- Disbanded: October 1943
- Country: Independent State of Croatia
- Branch: Home Guard
- Type: Infantry (militia)
- Role: Defence of the Bosnian Muslim population
- Size: 5,000–6,000
- Headquarters: Tuzla
- Nickname(s): Muslim Legion
- Engagements: World War II in Yugoslavia (northeastern Bosnia)

Commanders
- Notable commanders: Muhamed Hadžiefendić

The Hadžiefendić Legion (Serbo-Croatian: Hadžiefendićeva legija) or Muslim Legion was a Bosniak self-defence militia and Croatian Home Guard unit based in the predominantly Muslim Tuzla region of the Independent State of Croatia (NDH) during World War II. The brigade–sized force was formally a "Volunteer Home Guard Regiment", and was raised in late December 1941 under the command of the former Royal Yugoslav Army reservist Major Muhamed Hadžiefendić, who had been commissioned into the Croatian Home Guard. By the end of the year, the Legion had commenced forming battalions in six towns in northeastern Bosnia.

The Legion was the most powerful and successful Muslim militia in the Tuzla region, and fought Yugoslav Partisans and Chetniks in northeastern Bosnia between December 1941 and October 1943. By April 1942 it was effectively operating outside of the control of the Croatian Home Guard, although they continued to supply arms and ammunition to the Legion. Members of the Legion formed the core of the volunteers that joined the 13th Waffen Mountain Division of the SS Handschar (1st Croatian) in mid–1943, and the resultant weakening of the Legion contributed to its destruction during the Partisan liberation of Tuzla in October 1943.

== Background and formation ==
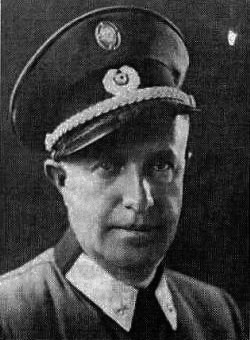
The founder and commander of the Hadžiefendić Legion, Muhamed Hadžiefendić

In December 1941, prior to the split between the Yugoslav Partisans and the Chetniks in eastern Bosnia, the two overwhelmingly Serb forces cooperated in brutal operations against Bosniak villages. The formation of the Hadžiefendić Legion was one of the Bosniak responses to these attacks. By the end of December 1941, the Legion had commenced forming battalions in Bijeljina, Brčko, Gračanica, Puračić, Živinice and Tojšići. The recruits that joined the Legion were largely Muslim conscripts that refused to join the Croatian Home Guard.

In January 1942, the Ozren Detachment of the Partisans made an agreement with the Chetnik leader Dragoslav Račić for the "cleansing of Muslim villages of the Hadžiefendić [Muslim] militia". The Legion subsequently became "the most powerful and successful Muslim militia in the Tuzla region", and grew to a strength of between 5,000–6,000 by April 1942. By this time the NDH authorities in Tuzla were reporting that the Legion did not recognise Ustaše rule, and was effectively operating outside of Croatian Home Guard control. Despite this, and demands by the NDH police that they be disbanded, the Legion continued to receive arms and ammunition from the Croatian Home Guard units in their area of operations as the Home Guard units relied on the support of the Legion in fighting both the Partisans and Chetniks.

== Muslim autonomy movement ==
The inability or unwillingness of the NDH authorities to protect the Muslim population, local Muslim leaders pushed for autonomy. As part of this push, the leaders petitioned Adolf Hitler in late 1942 for the creation of a "Bosnian Guard" based on the Hadžiefendić Legion, to be under the direct control of the German Wehrmacht. The proposal also requested the transfer of all Muslim members of the Home Guard and Ustaše militia to the new force.

The Germans were unwilling to undermine the NDH and refused to support the idea of a "Bosnian Guard" or even Muslim autonomy. Instead, the Reichsführer-SS Heinrich Himmler proposed to Hitler that a Muslim Waffen-SS division be raised instead. This allowed the Germans to take advantage of Muslim disillusionment with the NDH to their own advantage. Despite the objections of the NDH government, this was ultimately approved in February 1943, and Hadžiefendić was enlisted to assist in the recruiting. By mid–May 6,000 members of the Hadžiefendić Legion had been assembled for induction into the 13th Waffen Mountain Division of the SS Handschar (1st Croatian).

== See also ==
- List of military units named after people

== Destruction ==
Following the recruitment of many of its members into the 13th SS Division in 1943, Tuzla was liberated by the Partisans in October 1943. Many members of the Legion deserted to the Partisans at this time. During the fighting, Hadžiefendić and 55 of his men were killed and the legion ceased to exist.
