= Rovčanin =

- Language: Serbian and Montenegrin

Origin
- Languages: Serbian and Montenegrin
- Meaning: a man from Rovca

Rovčanin is a Serbian and Montenegrin surname. It is derived from the Serbian language and means a man from the region of Rovca in Montenegro.

Notable people with Rovčanin surname include:

- Husein Rovčanin - (1907 – 26 April 1944) was a commander of a detachment of Sandžak Muslim militia from Komaran (Brodarevo in Sandžak) during the Second World War.
- Miljan Rovcanin - (born 6 December 1993) is a Serbian professional boxer.
- Ersan Rovčanin - born 24 March 1993) is a Serbian football midfielder who plays for Metalac Gornji Milanovac

== See also ==
- Rovčani
