= Koniče =

- Village (Selo)
- Location within Serbia
- Coordinates: 43°03′N 20°17′E
- Country: Serbia
- District: Raška District
- Municipality: Tutin

Population (2002)
  - Total: 322
- Time zone: UTC+1 (CET)
  - Summer (DST): UTC+2 (CEST)

Koniče is a village in the municipality of Tutin, Serbia. According to the 2002 census, the village has a population of 322 people.

== History ==
The village (Albanian: Koniça) was founded in the early 18th century by brotherhoods of the Shala fis. The Ottomans forced the movement of Catholic Albanians from Shala and Kelmendi to the Pešter plateau as means to control their activity. The people of the village today still themselves malësors (malisori - mountaineers in Albanian).

== Language ==
Most people today speak the local Serbo-Croatian dialect with Albanian influences. Most significant toponyms in the village are of Albanian origin.:

== Notable people ==
- Xhemail Koniçani, Albanian military commander.
