= 30th Division (Yugoslav Partisans) =

Yugoslav Partisan military division formed in 1943

30th Slovenia Division
- Flag of Democratic Federal Yugoslavia (used by the Partisans)
- Active: 1943–1945
- Country: Democratic Federal Yugoslavia
- Branch: Yugoslav Partisan Army
- Type: Infantry
- Engagements: World War II in Yugoslavia; Trieste Operation

Commanders
- Notable commanders: Albert Jakopič; Ivan Turšič

The 30th Slovenia Division (Serbian: Trideseta slovenačka divizija) was a Yugoslav Partisan division formed on 6 October 1943 in Western Slovenia.

== History ==
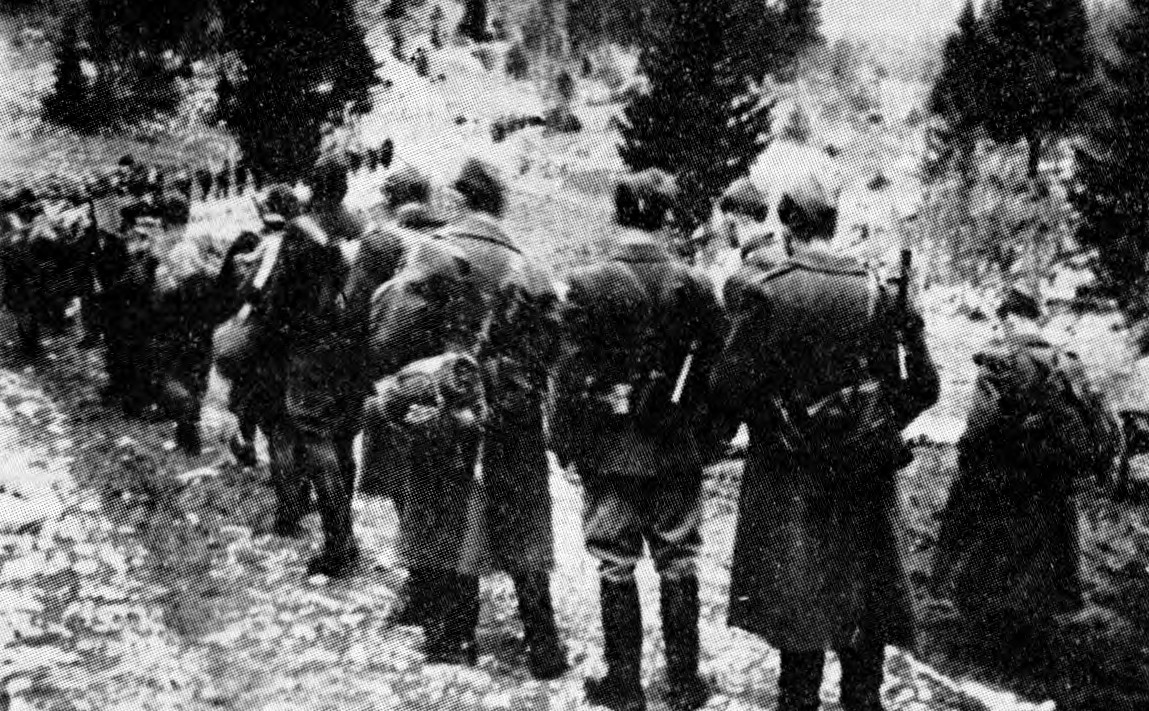
Men from the 30th Slovenia Division on the march

The division was formed from the "Gorička", "Simon Gregorčič" and the First Soča Brigade. The first two brigades were later replaced by the Second and Third Soča Brigades. The Division became part of the 9th Corps on 22 December 1943, and was known as the 30th Goriska or Gorizia Division.

The division operated mostly in Slovenia during its existence. It operated until the end of 1943 in the Upper Soča Valley. In January 1944, it fought with German units that penetrated the Banjšice Plateau and the Trnovo Forest Plateau and in February 1944 went on march in Beneska Slovenija. In first half of March 1944, it attacked German communication lines in the Upper Soca Valley.

After that, it operated in the Cerkljanska region, around Idrija and in the Vipava Valley.

In February and March 1945, it was engaged in heavy battles around Trnovski gozd, especially during the last German offensive Unternehmen Rübezahl III against the 9th NOVJ Corps, in the second half of March 1945. At the beginning of April 1945, the 30th Division managed to break through the German encirclement, but suffered considerable losses.

At the end of April 1945, it took part in final battles for liberation of Yugoslavia; and on 1 May 1945, it participated in the attack on Opicina and in the liberation of Trieste. On 3 May 1945, the 30th Division NOVJ was disbanded, and its units were transferred among different KNOJ (Defence Corps) units.

== Links ==
- Vojska.net
