= Sulejman Pačariz =

Bosniak islamic cleric and commander

Sulejman Pačariz Hodja
- Sulejman Pačariz
- Born: 1900; Bioča near Berane, Ottoman Empire
- Died: 1945 (aged 44–45)
- Military career
- Allegiance: Croatia; Italy; Germany
- Service years: 1941–1945
- Rank: Colonel
- Units: gendarmerie of Kingdom of Yugoslavia; outlaws of Jusuf Mehonjić; gendarmerie of Kingdom of Yugoslavia; military imam in Bar county; detachment of Sandžak Muslim militia from Hisardžik (Serbian: Пачаризовци); SS Polizei-Selbstschutz-Regiment Sandschak
- Conflicts: World War II in Yugoslavia; Uprising in Montenegro (1941); Battle of Sjenica (1941); Attack on Kosatica; Operation Kugelblitz; Attack on Karoševina; Operation Draufgänger; Operation Rübezahl

Hafiz Sulejman Pačariz or Sulejman Paçarizi (1900–1945) was an Islamic cleric and a commander of a Muslim militia detachment from the village of Hisardžik (Prijepolje, in modern-day Serbia) during the Second World War.

In 1943, when the Germans took control of Sandžak, Pačariz was appointed as the commander of the SS Polizei-Selbstschutz-Regiment Sandschak. The forces under his command were commonly referred to as Pačarizovci (meaning "those belonging to Pačariz"). He was known for allegedly leading his forces while riding a black horse.

In 1945, Pačariz was captured, tried, and found guilty of massacring civilians. He was subsequently executed as a war criminal.

== Early life ==
Pačariz was born in Bioča, near Berane, in 1900. His father was the local hodža (Muslim religious leader). In 1912, during the First Balkan War, the Army of Montenegro set his village on fire, forcing his family to flee. They first moved to Lozna, near Bijelo Polje, and later to Brodarevo, where his father became the local imam.

In 1922, local Chetniks killed Pačariz's father because he supported the local outlaw Jusuf Mehonjić. At the time, Sulejman was a member of the Yugoslav gendarmerie. After his father's murder, he briefly joined Mehonjić's outlaws before returning to the gendarmerie.

Before 1930, Pačariz accepted the position of imam in Hisardžik. In 1938, he became the military imam in the county of Bar.

== World War II ==
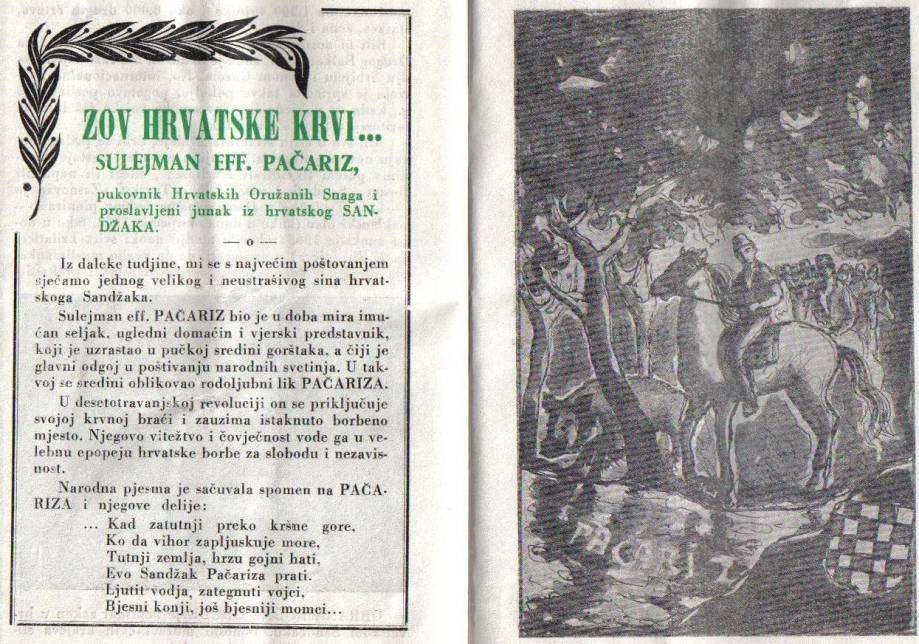
A song and drawing from "Osvit" magazine, published in Sarajevo during World War II

=== Within the Ustaše ===
At the beginning of the Second World War in Yugoslavia, the Ustaše forces of the Independent State of Croatia occupied Sandžak and appointed Pačariz, along with other Muslim notables from the region, to paid positions as military officers in the Sandžak Muslim militia. Initially, they were given the rank of Major and were engaged in operations against the Serbs, who were part of the Chetniks. By September 1941, the Ustaše transferred control of Sandžak to the Italians.

=== Within the forces of Italy ===
In late autumn 1941, Montenegrin communists attempted to negotiate with Pačariz but failed to convince him and his subordinate officers to join the Partisans. Pačariz mobilized Muslims living in Prijepolje, on the right bank of the Lim River, as well as in the former municipalities of Velika Župa and Seljašnica.

He received weapons and military equipment from the Ustaše and later from the Italians. Pačariz often exaggerated the number of militiamen under his command and kept their monthly salaries, provided by the Italians, for himself.

In mid-November 1941, a Chetnik unit of 40 men went to Kosatica and attempted to disarm the Muslim militia commanded by Sulejman Pačariz. The militiamen refused to surrender their weapons, and a firefight ensued. During the clash, two militiamen were killed, and one Chetnik was wounded.

In retaliation for the deaths of his two men, Pačariz's Muslim militia attacked a part of Kosatica inhabited by Serbs. They captured, brutally tortured, and killed seven Serbian residents of the village.

==== Battle of Sjenica ====
On 22 December 1941, the Muslim militia forces from Hisardžik and Sjenica, commanded by Pačariz, successfully repelled an attack by Partisans attempting to capture Sjenica. During the battle, 18 Partisans were captured. Pačariz occasionally visited them in Sjenica's prison.

In February 1942, the Italian command in Prijepolje convinced Pačariz to escort the captured Partisans from Sjenica to Prijepolje. The Italians intended to exchange the prisoners for captured Italian soldiers. Pačariz escorted 13 of the Partisans to Prijepolje, leaving behind five wounded Partisans in Sjenica. All 13 Partisans brought to the Italians were executed by shooting at the Purića stream, below Srijetež.

Pačariz established a so-called "flying platoon" composed of his most loyal men. He used this unit to forcibly mobilize people and pressure wealthier Muslims to buy arms from him. Those who opposed him were brutally beaten and terrorized. Pačariz also used his position for personal enrichment, receiving a salary from the occupiers and engaging in various corrupt practices.

In April 1942, the Partisans burned three houses belonging to pro-Chetnik families and one house belonging to a soldier in Pačariz's unit in Velika Župa. In retaliation, Pačariz's men burned three pro-Partisan Orthodox houses. The following day, Pačariz organized a raid in Velika Župa with the Italians, during which he stole cattle and redistributed it to the villages of Hisardžik and Sjenica.

In August 1942, alongside Italian forces and the legalized Chetniks of Vuk Kalaitović, Pačariz participated in an anti-Partisan operation in the Mileševa srez targeting a local Partisan cell. While the Italians captured only two guerrilla fighters, Pačariz's men apprehended five suspicious individuals, one of whom they executed.

Together with other commanders of the Muslim militia, including Husein Rovčanin, Pačariz attended a conference in the village of Godijeva. At the conference, they agreed to attack Serb villages near Sjenica and other parts of Sandžak.

In July 1943, Pačariz's forces razed and pillaged the village of Stranjane. However, because the Germans disapproved of robbery, Pačariz was briefly placed in custody.

=== Within the forces of Germany ===
Following his appointment as Höhere SS-und Polizeiführer Sandschak (Higher SS and Police Leader Sandžak) in September 1943, Karl von Krempler became known as the "Sandžak Prince" due to his relatively successful formation of the SS Polizei-Selbstschutz-Regiment Sandschak. In October 1943, he arrived in the Sandžak region and took command of the local militia, which consisted of around 5,000 men headquartered in Sjenica. This formation was sometimes referred to as the Kampfgruppe Krempler or, more derisively, the Muslimischegruppe von Krempler.

As the senior Waffen SS officer, Karl von Krempler appointed Pačariz as the formal commander of the unit. However, Krempler, serving as the key military trainer and the primary contact for German arms and munitions, retained effective control.

Pačariz participated in the Axis-organized Operation Kugelblitz, which began on 4 December 1943. In early 1944, he was appointed commander of all militia units in the Mileševo srez, including those under Husein Rovčanin.

In 1944, during a meeting, Pačariz personally killed his unit commander, Hamda Bajraktarević, due to Bajraktarević's attempts to establish cooperation with the Partisans. In July 1944, German soldiers and Pačariz's militia killed at least 18 Serbs in Karoševina, near Prijepolje.

In November 1944, after suffering heavy losses to the Partisans, Pačariz and his units retreated to Sarajevo, where the SS Polizei-Selbstschutz-Regiment Sandschak was placed under the command of Ustaše General Maks Luburić. Pačariz was subsequently promoted to the rank of Ustaše Colonel.

== Death ==
In 1945, Pačariz was captured near Banja Luka, where he was put on trial and found guilty of massacring civilians. He was executed as a war criminal.

Pačariz is also commemorated in a song.

== Sources ==
- Живковић, Милутин Д. (2017). Санџак 1941–1943. Филозофски Фалултет, Универзитет у Београду.
