= 31st Division (Yugoslav Partisans) =

Yugoslav Partisan military division formed in 1943

31st Slovenia Division
- Flag of Democratic Federal Yugoslavia (used by the Partisans)
- Active: 1943–1945
- Country: Democratic Federal Yugoslavia
- Branch: Yugoslav Partisan Army
- Type: Infantry
- Size: ~3,300 (November 1943)
- Engagements: World War II in Yugoslavia

Commanders
- Notable commanders: Stane Potočar

The 31st Slovenia Division (Serbo-Croatian Latin: Tridesetprva slovenačka divizija) was a Yugoslav Partisan division formed on 6 October 1943 in Western Slovenia. It was formed from the 7th Slovenia Brigade, 16th Slovenia Brigade and Tolmin Brigade. Before it was renamed upon joining the 9th Corps on 22 December 1943, this division was known as the 26th Triglav Division. The division operated mostly in Slovenia during its existence.
