= Battle of Sjenica (1941) =

1941 battle of World War II in Yugoslavia

Battle for Sjenica
- Part of World War II in Yugoslavia
Date	22 December 1941
Location	Sjenica, Italian governorate of Montenegro (modern-day Serbia)
Result	Axis victory

Participants
Sandžak Muslim militia Supported by: Italy; Germany	Yugoslav Partisans

Commanders and leaders
Hasan Zvizdić; Sulejman Pačariz; Džemail Koničanin	Tadija Andrić †; Vladimir Knežević; Petar Stambolić

Units involved
Sandžak Muslim militia: Sjenica detachment; Tutin detachment; Prijepolje detachment; Milicija (police) (Serbs and Muslims)	Yugoslav Partisans: 2nd Takovo Company; Belgrade Company (part); Serbian-Sandžak Company (part)

Strength
800 – 900: 300 Milicija (Serbs and Muslims); 500 – 600 Sandžak Muslim militia	350

Casualties and losses
30 killed and 60 wounded	Around 100: 52 killed; 25 wounded; 18 – 22 captured

The Battle of Sjenica took place between attacking forces of Yugoslav Partisans on one side and defending forces of the Sandžak Muslim militia and town's militsiya (Serbs and Muslims) in Sjenica, on the territory of the Italian governorate of Montenegro.

== Background ==
At the beginning of the Second World War, the territory of Sandžak was a subject of territorial aspirations of all sides in the war. The Muslims wanted this region to be annexed to the Ustaše controlled Independent State of Croatia, which pursued a genocidal policy toward Serbs, Jews and Roma People. On the other hand, the Germans designated it to be a part of their occupation zone; Italians wanted to control all of Sandžak, while Albanians wanted it to be annexed to their Greater Albania. The Chetniks and Partisans struggled to keep Sandžak within Yugoslavia. Based on the agreement of July 1941, Sjenica was included in the Italian governorate of Montenegro.

Hasan Zvizdić was a wealthy Muslim whole-trader in Sjenica. He became a city governor, armed many local Muslims, and organized them as militia during the war. In December 1941, Zvizdić refused to allow Partisans to capture Sjenica because he was afraid that Chetniks, German and Italian forces would attack Partisans in Sjenica and kill many of its population as well. He explained to Partisans that he had around 5,000 members of Muslim militia under his command and that he would use them against Partisans or Chetniks if they tried to capture Sjenica. According to historian Živković, Zvizdić was actually concerned that his lucrative contracts to supply Italian and German army with livestock would be cancelled if Partisans capture the city.

== Armed forces ==
The Partisan military units that attacked the town belonged to the 2nd Takovo Company commanded by Tadija Andrić, part of the Belgrade Company and part of the Serbian-Sandžak Company commanded by Vladimir Knežević and Petar Stambolić. The staff of the Belgrade Company was against the attack on Sjenica, but was outvoted.

On 23 November, the Partisans captured and executed several Chetnik commanders near Nova Varoš. This action compromised the Partisans in the eyes of many Serbs from Sjenica, who developed animosity toward them. As a result, many Serbs from Sjenica joined forces with the town's militsiya to defend the town from the Partisans.

== Battle ==
The attack on Sjenica began on 22 December 1941 at 4:30 a.m. The temperature was −20 °C (−4 °F), and snowdrifts were about 1 meter. The Partisans attacked the town from three directions. Initially, the Belgrade company managed to penetrate the town and capture its center. The Partisans faced strong gunfire in the period between 8 and 10 a.m. and even hot water thrown at them from the windows of the houses. The Belgrade company managed to retreat from the town only after 11 a.m. and reached Nova Varoš only on 23 December because they were carrying four heavily wounded Partisans.

The remaining two groups failed to fulfill their tasks because they were easily repelled back to the town's periphery. On the same day, the forces of Muslim militia from Prijepolje, commanded by Pačariz, and from Sjenica, commanded by Zvizdić successfully repelled the attack of Partisans who tried to capture Sjenica. They were supported by one company from German-controlled Tutin, commanded by Džemail Koničanin, who joined them based on the invitation of Zvizdić.

Communist casualties included Andrija Tadić, the commander of the 2nd Takovo company.

== Aftermath ==
Josip Broz Tito criticized the Partisan attack on Sjenica, which, according to his position, was against the direct order of the supreme command and Communist Party. Belgrade battalion lost a third of its manpower, and Priboj and Sjenica companies ceased to exist in the battle. Another defeat shock already low morale among Partisans in the area. Because of the attack on Sjenica in early 1942, Italians closed the border on relation Plav-Rožaje-Tutin and armed part of the local Muslim population in the area. Prisoners of war were captured in Sjenica until February 1942, when Zvizdić sent, on Italian orders, 23 of prisoners to Prijepolje. Pačariz and his men escorted them there. They were in light clothes, so a few of them lost limbs from freezing. Some of the prisoners were women who were tortured and raped. Four of the prisoners were exchanged with Partisans, two were bought by Pačariz, and other the 17 were executed by Italians in Prijepolje.

== Sources ==
- Ćuković, Mirko (1964). Sandžak. Nolit-Prosveta.
- Petronijević, Vuk; Jakovijević, Milutin; Stefanović, Mladen (1968). Čačanski kraj u narodnooslobodilačkoj borbi 1941–1944: hronologija događaja. Istorijski arhiv.
- Živković, Milutin (2011). "Dešavanja u Sandžaku od julskog ustanka do kraja 1941 godine" (PDF). Baština (in Serbian). 31. Priština, Leposavić: Institute for Serbian Culture.
- Živković, Milutin D. (2017). Санџак 1941–1943 [Sandžak 1941–1943] (Doctoral) (in Serbo-Croatian). Belgrade: University of Belgrade. OCLC 1242119546.
