= 9th Corps (Yugoslav Partisans) =

9th Slovenian Corps
- The flag of the Slovene Partisans
- Active: 13 December 1943– 9 May 1945
- Country: Yugoslavia
- Branch: (Democratic Federal Yugoslavia) Yugoslav Partisan Army
- Type: Infantry
- Size: Corps
- Part of: 4th Army
- Colors: Red, White, Blue
- March: Marš na Drinu
- Engagements: World War II in Yugoslavia * Operation Wolkenbruch * Operation Adler * Battle of Tarnova * Trieste operation

Commanders
- Notable commanders: Lado Ambrožič; Stane Potočar; Jože Borštnar

The Partisan 9th Corps (Slovene: IX Korpus), was a formation of the Yugoslav Partisans during World War II. It consisted of division and brigade-size units, and operated in the Italian-annexed Province of Ljubljana, in Yugoslav territories under German civil administration, the Independent State of Croatia and northeastern Italy during World War II.

The corps took part in many operations against Germans and Italians forces prior to the surrender of Italy on 8 September 1943. One of the most significant was the German Operation Adler.

After a decision of Palmiro Togliatti, all communist units (named Garibaldini after Giuseppe Garibaldi) operating in territories reclaimed by the Yugoslavs were to be incorporated into the Yugoslav Partisans, and wrote personally the content of the order of the day to be adopted by communist partisans.

== List of units ==
- 30th Jugoslav Division, based on 17th SNOB (Slovenian Brigade of National Liberation) "Simon Gregorčič" and 18th SNOUB (Slovenian Assault Brigade of National Liberation) "Bazoviška"
- 31st Jugoslav Division, based on 3rd (initially 6th bde) SNOB "Ivan Gradnik", 7th SNOB "France Prešeren" and 16th SNOB "Janko Premrl Vojko".
- 19th SNOB (Slovenian Brigade of National Liberation) "Srečko Kosovel"
- Division Garibaldi "Natisone" (Italian partisans), composed from 156th partisan brigade "Bruno Buozzi" and 157th brigade "Guido Picelli"
- 20th brigade "Garibaldi Triestina", formed with Italian partisans

== Bibliography ==
- Cattaruzza, Marina (2007). L'Italia e il confine orientale. Il Mulino. ISBN 978-8815113948.
