= Petnjica =

Village and municipality in Northern Montenegro

Petnjica Петњица
- Village and municipality
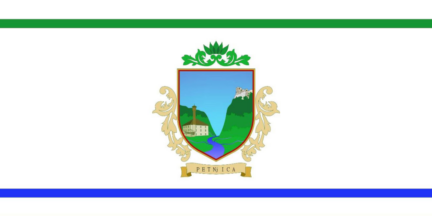
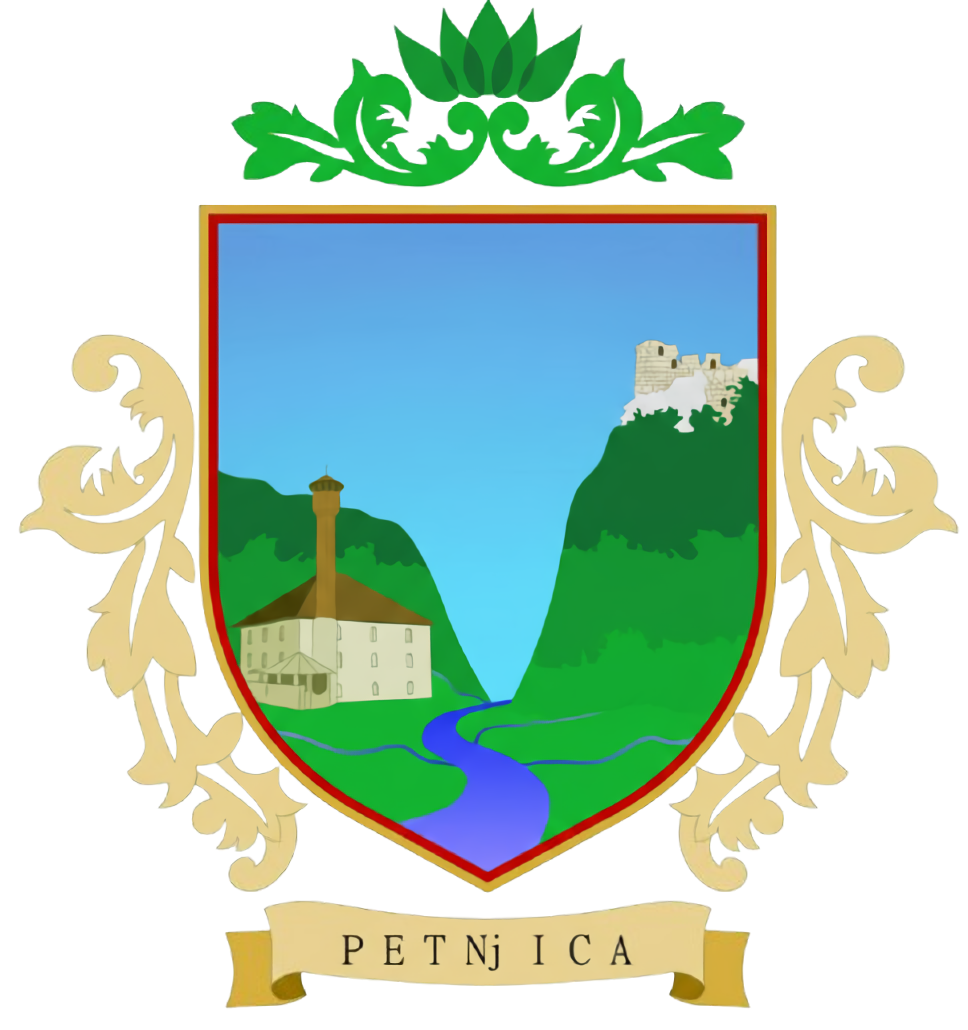
- Flag Coat of arms

- Location within Montenegro
- Coordinates: 42°54′32″N 19°57′52″E
- Country: Montenegro
- Region: Northern
- Municipality: Petnjica

Government
  - Type: Mayor-Assembly
  - Mayor: Erol Muratović (DPS)
- Elevation: 851 m (2,792 ft)

Population (2011)
  - Village: 539
  - Municipality: 5,482
- Time zone: UTC+1 (CET)
  - Summer (DST): UTC+2 (CEST)
- Vehicle registration: PT
- Climate: Cfb

Petnjica (Montenegrin Cyrillic: Петњица) is a town in Montenegro in the northern region, and the center of Petnjica Municipality. Petnjica regained its municipality status on May 28, 2013, which it previously had from 1945 to 1957, when it was merged with the Berane Municipality.

== Demographics ==
Village is the administrative center of Petnjica Municipality, which had a population of 5,482 in 2011. The settlement itself had a population of 539.

Ethnic groups in 2011

Ethnicity	Number	Percentage
Bosniaks	421	78.12%
Muslims	91	16.88%
Roma	19	3.53%
Other	8	1.48%
Total	539	100%

== Sports ==
The local football team is FK Petnjica, who play in the country's third tier. They play their home games at the Gusare Stadium.

== Notable people ==
- Osman Rastoder, commander of Sandžak Muslim militia
- Rifat Rastoder, Montenegrin politician
- Šerbo Rastoder, Montenegrin historian

== International relations ==
Petnjica is twinned with:

- Rumelange, Luxembourg
