= SS Polizei-Selbstschutz-Regiment Sandschak =

- Active: 1943–1944
- Size: 5,000
- Nickname: Moslem Legion
- Engagements: World War II; Operation Rübezahl; Operation Draufgänger

Commanders
- Current commander: Sulejman Pačariz

SS Polizei Selbstschutz Regiment Sandschak (from German; "SS Police Self-Protection Regiment Sandžak", Serbo-Croatian Latin: SS-policijska pukovnija samozaštite Sandžaka), also known as the Krempler Legion (Serbo-Croatian Latin: Legija "Krempler", Serbo-Croatian Cyrillic: Легија „Кремплер") was a unit established on the territory of Sandžak by the senior Waffen-SS officer Karl von Krempler under the command of Sulejman Pačariz in Axis occupied Yugoslavia. Krempler went to the Sandžak region (named after the Ottoman administrative unit "Sanjak") in October and reorganized the local volunteer militia of around 5,000 anti-communist Muslim men headquartered in Sjenica.

The SS Police Self-Defence Regiment Sandžak was created by joining three battalions of Albanian collaborationist troops with one battalion of the Sandžak Muslim militia. At one point around 2,000 members of the regiment operated in Sjenica.

All newly recruited members of this police were sent for two-months military training to Raška and Vučitrn. They sang Bosnian songs while they marched through populated places.

In August 1944 took part in operation Operation Rübezahl under command of 5th SS Mountain Corps. On 14 October 1944 Yugoslav partisans defeated the regiment during a surprise attack in which they took Sjenica and pushed it back to Duga Poljana, 23 kilometres (14 mi) to the east. This action marked the end of the unit in Sandžak, although Germans recaptured Sjenica on 25 October 1944. In November 1944, Pačariz together with his troops retreated to Sarajevo where the regiment was put under command of Ustaše General Maks Luburić. Pačariz was promoted to the rank of Ustaše Colonel.

In 1945 Pačariz was captured near Banja Luka, put on trial and found guilty for massacres of civilians. He was executed as a war criminal.

== Annotations ==
- Name:
  - Selbstschutz-Regiment "Sandschak".
  - "Police Self-Defense Regiment Sandjak" (Polizei-Selbstschutz-Regiment Sandschak).

== Sources ==
- Kumm, Otto (2007). VORWÄRTS, PRINZ EUGEN! - Geschichte der 7. SS-Freiwilligen-Division "Prinz Eugen" (de). Coburg: Munin Verlag.
