= Osman Rastoder =

Sandžak Muslim Nazi-collaborationist military leader

Osman Rastoder Aga
- Born: 1882; Radmance, Petnjica, Ottoman Empire (modern day Montenegro)
- Died: 26 January 1946 (aged c. 63)
- Burial place: Radmanci, Petnjica, Montenegro
- Military career
- Allegiance: Italy; Nazi Germany; Kingdom of Albania
- Units: Detachment of militia from Petnjica; Sandžak Muslim militia Upper Bihor Detachment
- Conflicts: World War II in Yugoslavia: Uprising in Montenegro

Osman Rastoder (Albanian: Osman Rastoderi) (1882 – 26 January 1946) was a commander of the Muslim militia in upper Bihor during the Second World War. He was a collaborator with the Italians during their World War II occupation of Bihor.

Rastoder belonged to the supporters of the annexation of Sandžak by the Greater Albania.

== Early life ==
Rastoder was born in a wealthy family and could afford to be educated first in madrassas in Novi Pazar and Đakovica, and later in Istanbul. His family moved to Istanbul in 1915 and remained there while Osman returned to the Balkans in 1919, to Novi Pazar, where he married a second time. He had seven children in two marriages. In 1926 he returned to Petnjica with his two wives, where he was appointed mullah in the villages of Petnjica and Savin Bor, before being appointed imam in the local mosque. Besides Serbian, Rastoder spoke Ottoman Turkish, Arabic and Albanian.

== World War II ==
In June 1941 Rastoder was appointed as commander of local Muslim detachment which evolved in September 1941 in a detachment of Sandžak Muslim militia responsible for the territory of upper Bihor.

At the beginning of 1941 the relations between towns Petnjica and Police worsened due to the killing of Rastoder's son, in Berane.

During the Uprising in Montenegro a detachment of the militia from Bihor commanded by Rastoder attacked insurgents toward Berane. His forces burned down and robbed Orthodox Christian houses in villages Goražde, Zagrađe, Tmušiće and Lješnica. 54 houses were razed and 6 Christians were killed during action, whereas 5 Rastoder's men were killed. In autumn 1941, Rastoder was appointed to command the militia detachment in upper Bihor with its seat in Petnjica. Along with Italians, Rastoder's militia attack village Azane near Berane, killing 5 Serbs and arresting 19, who were later sent to camps, 4 dying there. Local Muslims prevented more arrests from Italians and Rastoder's men, by hiding many Serbs from the village from them. Yugoslav Partisans from Berane attacked Petnjica, hoping to eliminate Rastoder's militia. Despite early success, capturing and burning down police station, but attempt to capture Rastoder's house failed attack was ultimately repelled.

In February 1942, Rastoder led an attack against Serb villages on right side of river Lim in Bijelo Polje County. In this attack villages Ivanje, Raduliće, Potoci, Crnča and Dubovo were razed. Together with militia commanders (including Sulejman Pačariz and Husein Rovčanin) he participated in a conference in village of Godijeva, and agreed to attack Serb villages near Sjenica and other parts of Sandžak. On 31 March 1942, Chetnik leader Pavle Đurišić met with Rastoder and offered him a peace agreement, which Rastoder refused. Rastoder favorized armed conflicts with Orthodox population of the region, above all with those from Bijelo Polje and Berane. Rastoder's position could be partially explained by attack on his house by local Partisans, as well as murder of one of his sons by Chetniks in Berane.

The detachment of militia commanded by Rastoder, supported by Albanian irregulars and German forces, attacked and killed 35 Partisans and 19 Italian irregulars of the Garibaldi Battalion on 22 January 1944 near the village of Vrbica (Berane). Rastoder was killed by police on 26 January 1946 on Ladevac mountain.

== Legacy ==
In February 2013, members of the Bosniak community in Luxembourg established the Mulla Hrastoder, an award named for Rastoder in his honor. Streets in Sarajevo, Bosnia and Herzegovina and in Petnjica, Montenegro were named after him.

== See also ==
- Rastoder

== Sources ==
- Živković, Milutin D. (2017). Санџак 1941–1943 [Sandžak 1941–1943] (Doctoral) (in Serbo-Croatian). Belgrade: University of Belgrade. OCLC 1242119546.
