= Tutiće =

- Village
- Location within Serbia
- Coordinates: 43°10′N 19°48′E
- Country: Serbia
- District: Zlatibor District
- Municipality: Sjenica

Area
  - Total: 10.49 km^{2} (4.05 sq mi)

Population (2002)
  - Total: 48
  - Density: 4.6/km^{2} (12/sq mi)
- Time zone: UTC+1 (CET)
  - Summer (DST): UTC+2 (CEST)

Tutiće is a village in the municipality of Sjenica, Serbia. According to the 2002 census, the village has a population of 48 people.
