= Šavci =

Šavci Шавци
- Village (Selo)
- Location within Serbia
- Coordinates: 43°08′14.9″N 20°25′57.3″E
- Country: Serbia
- District: Raška District
- Municipality: Novi Pazar

Area
  - Total: 1.08 sq mi (2.80 km^{2})
- Elevation: 1,670 ft (510 m)

Population (2011)
  - Total: 330
  - Density: 305.25/sq mi (117.857/km^{2})
- Time zone: UTC+1 (CET)
  - Summer (DST): UTC+2 (CEST)
- Area code: 020

Šavci is a village situated in the Novi Pazar municipality in Serbia. According to the 2011 census of the area, there is 330 inhabitants. The population is up 83 people from 2002's 247 inhabitants.

== Demography ==
There are 165 adult inhabitants in the village of Šavci, and the average age of the people is 34.3 years (34.5 for men and 34.1 for women). There are 64 households in the settlement, and the average number of members per household is 3.86. As of 2002, 46.55% of people are Serbian, 41.29% Bosniak, 11.33% Roma, and 0.80% are unknown.

Population in this settlement is very inhomogeneous.

Population Over Time
Year	Inhabitants
1948	186
1953	274
1961	299
1971	358
1981	332
1991	435
2002	247
2011	330
