= Bukovica, Pljevlja =

Bukovica is a rural area of Pljevlja municipality located in northern Montenegro, and is part of the Sandžak region. To the north lay the Bosnian municipalities of Čajniče and Foča. Bukovica is 104 square kilometres (40 sq mi) and contains over 30 hamlets with 1 to 10 houses.

== Sources ==
- HLC (10 February 2003). Bukovica (PDF). HLC. ISBN 86-82599-39-2. Archived from the original (PDF) on 19 January 2012.
