= Karl von Krempler =

German Schutzstaffel officer (1896–1971)

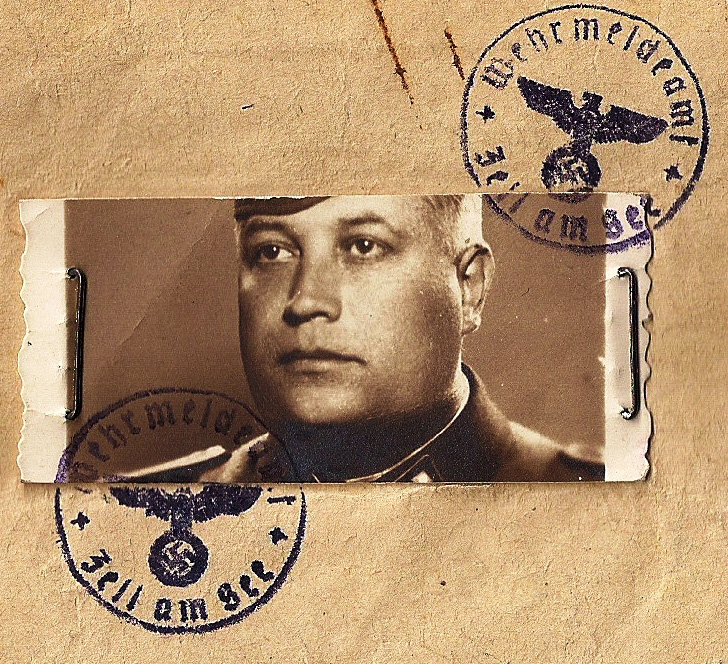
- War era photo used on a post-war document - 1945.
- Born: 26 May 1896; Pirot, Serbia
- Died: 17 April 1971 (aged 74); Salzburg, Austria
- Military career
- Allegiance: Austria-Hungary; Nazi Germany
- Branch: Austro-Hungarian Army; Waffen-SS
- Service years: 1915–1920; 1942–1945
- Rank: Oberleutnant; SS-Standartenführer
- Nickname: The Sanjak Prince
- Unit: SS Polizei-Selbstschutz-Regiment Sandschak
- Commands: SS and Police Leader, Sandschak

Karl von Krempler, later only Karl Krempler (Serbian Cyrillic: Карл Кремплер, 26 May 1896 – 17 April 1971) was a German SS-Standartenführer and SS and Police Leader during the Nazi era. In World War II, he was responsible for recruiting Bosniaks from Bosnia and the Sandžak region of Serbia/Montenegro into the Waffen-SS.

== Early life ==
Karl von Krempler was born on 26 May 1896 in Pirot, Kingdom of Serbia. He was the son of an Austrian engineer and Tereza Krempler (née Waldman). Krempler had two older sisters Arela and Berta. In 1915, he volunteered as a cadet for the Lower Austrian Infantry Regiment No. 84 (k.u.k. Niederösterreichischen Infanterie-Regiment Nr. 84). In 1920, he was released from active service with the rank of Oberleutnant.

== World War II ==
Krempler spoke fluent Turkish, Serbian, and German. He was considered a specialist within the SS on Islam and in 1942 was recruited by Heinrich Himmler and Artur Phleps to participate in the formation of a proposed Bosniak Handschar Division within the Waffen-SS, the 13th Waffen Mountain Division of the SS Handschar (1st Croatian). Unlike most SS personnel, Krempler was not a member of the Nazi Party.

"On 3 March 1942, Phleps met with fellow SS officer Karl von Krempler, who, together with Croatian government official Alija Šuljak, was to conduct the recruiting effort. The campaign began on the twentieth, when the multi-lingual von Krempler and Dr. Šuljak, accompanied by several other dignitaries began an eighteen-day recruiting tour through eleven Bosnian districts."

Alija Šuljak and Krempler soon fell out over the aims and purposes of the proposed Division. The pro-Ustasha, Croatian nationalist doctor, who was an entirely political appointee, criticized Krempler's spoken Serbian dialect and his use of traditional Islamic colours and emblems (green flags and crescent moons) rather than the new Ustaše symbols during recruitment.

"Upon reaching Tuzla he [von Krempler] met with Major Hadžiefendić, and on 28 March the pair departed for Sarajevo, where Hadžiefendić introduced the German to leading Muslim autonomists, including the Reis-el-Ulema, Hafiz Muhamed Pandža."

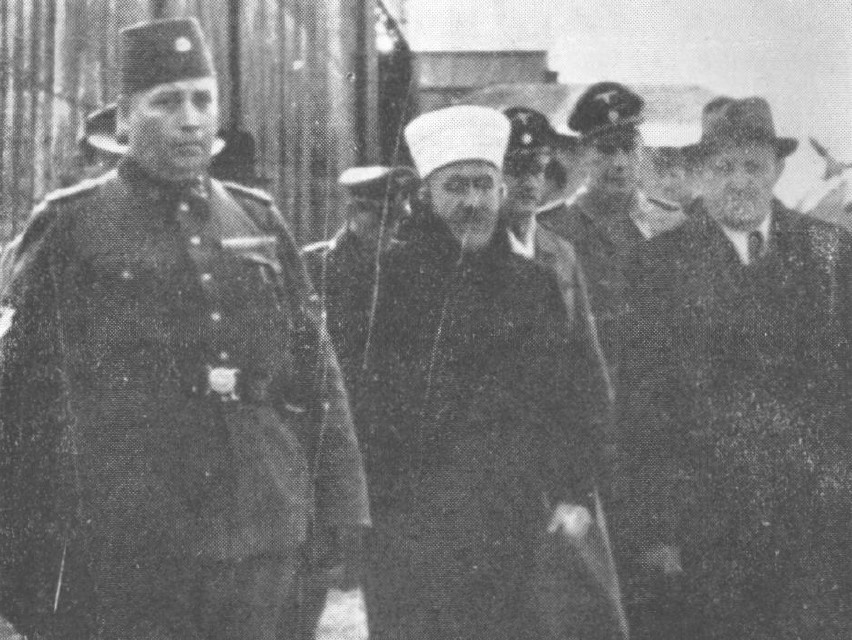
Mufti Ameen Al-Hussaini with Krempler in Sarajevo

Major Muhamed Hadžiefendić had been an important Muslim officer in the Yugoslav Royal Army and came from a distinguished family in Tuzla. Angry Ustaše officials demanded that Krempler be relieved of his duties and Envoy Siegfried Kasche of the Reich Foreign Affairs Ministry was also very critical of Krempler's perceived interference in the internal affairs of Croatia.

As he spoke Turkish, Krempler also helped liaise with and organise security for the visit to Bosnia by Mohammad Amin al-Husayni, the Grand Mufti of Jerusalem, over 30 March and 14 April 1942. (The Mufti was Arab but had served in the Turkish army during World War I). Croatian authorities tried to interrupt the visit, but Krempler was instrumental in arranging an interview between the Mufti and several Bosnian community leaders.

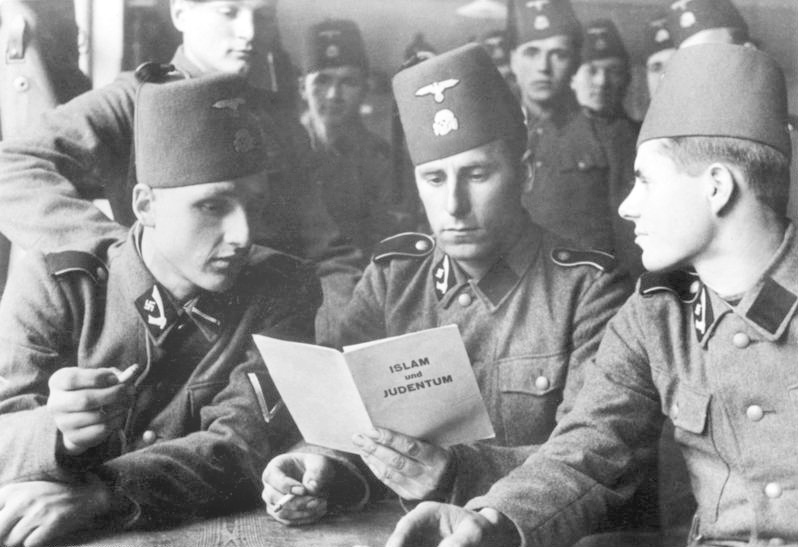
Muslim soldiers of the Handschar with a brochure about "Islam and Judaism", 1943

=== Role in Sandžak ===
Following his appointment to the post of SS-und Polizeiführer Sandschak (SS and Police Leader Sanjak) in September 1943, Krempler came to be known as the "Sanjak Prince" after his relatively successful formation of the Police Self-Defense Regiment Sandjak. He went to the Sandžak region in October and took over the local volunteer militia of around 5,000 anti-communist, anti-Serb Muslim men headquartered in Sjenica. This formation was sometimes thereafter called the Kampfgruppe Krempler or more derisively the "Muselmanengruppe von Krempler". As the senior Waffen SS officer, Krempler appointed a token local Muslim named Hafiz Sulejman Pačariz as the formal commander of the unit, but as the key military trainer and contact person with German arms and munitions, he remained effectively in control. One of Krempler's goals was to bring Muslim Militia and Chetniks together to fight against Yugoslav Partisans. He ordered that Muslims and Chetniks under German command must be obedient and banned fighting between them with 'harshest possible penalties'. In November 1943. Muslim collaborator Ćazim Sijarić was ordered by Krempler to stop attacking and plundering Serb villages and to return stolen cattle, and Sijarić had to comply with the order.

Krempler was replaced in June 1944 by SS Oberführer Richard Kaaserer, who commanded the Sandschak Regiment from 21 June 1944 to 28 November 1944. Kaaserer had been a member of the Austro-Hungarian Army in World War I. Unlike Krempler, Kaaserer was extradited to Yugoslavia after the war; he was tried and executed in January 1947 for war crimes.

Yugoslav Partisans, equipped with Allied war material attacked and seized Sjenica over 14–15 October 1944. The Kampfgruppe Krempler was effectively scattered: older men deserted or simply went home, whilst hundreds of younger men under the leadership of Pačariz travelled to Sarajevo where they joined up with the notorious Ustaše Vjekoslav Luburić. (Pačariz was granted the rank of Pukovnik – leader – in the Ustaše militia.) Krempler and his small contingent of German training personnel were reassigned during the latter part of October 1944.

In January 1945 he was reassigned to the administrative staff of the 13th Waffen Mountain Division of the SS Handschar (1st Croatian).

Krempler died on 17 April 1971 in Salzburg, Austria.
