= Operation Rübezahl =

World War II military operation

Operation Rübezahl I
- Part of World War II in Yugoslavia
| Date | 12–30 August 1944 |
| Location | German-occupied territory of Serbia and German-occupied territory of Montenegro |

Belligerents
| Germany; 21st Waffen Mountain Division of the SS Skanderbeg; Montenegrin Volunteer Corps; Free Arabian Legion; Sandžak Muslim militia; Croatia; Bulgaria | Yugoslav Partisans |

Commanders and leaders
| (Nazi Germany) Artur Phleps | (Yugoslav Partisans) Peko Dapčević |

Strength
| 50,000 | 16,000 |

Casualties and losses
| unknown | 1,000 injured, unknown killed |

Operation Rübezahl (German: Unternehmen Rübezahl) was the name of 3 German anti-partisan operations in Yugoslavia during World War II. The first operation announced the beginning of a strategic retreat by Nazi German troops from Serbia after the front change of Romania and Bulgaria.

== Operation Rübezahl I ==
In summer 1944, German soldiers were doing sweeps against communist-led Yugoslav Partisans under the overall command of Josip Broz Tito. But on 30 August, after Romania and Bulgaria split from their Nazi ally, Germany entered into a crisis on the Balkan front. While the forces of the Partisans were moving to unite with the Soviet Red Army in the German-occupied territory of Serbia, German troops tried to avoid defeat in that strategic area by implementing "Operation Rübezahl" to enable the organised retreat of Germans. Among them, there were:

- 1st Mountain Division
- 7th SS Volunteer Mountain Division Prinz Eugen
- 13th Waffen Mountain Division of the SS Handschar (1st Croatian)
- 21st Waffen Mountain Division of the SS Skanderbeg (1st Albanian)
- Free Arabian Legion

Between 20 and 22 August, German troops surrounded and destroyed a particularly large Partisan unit moving westwards from the Independent State of Croatia to occupied Serbia. Only a few Partisans survived thanks to Allied planes which managed to land on battered airstrips, air-lifting about a thousand injured to hospitals located in Italy. The 8th Regiment of the CDK was nearly destroyed in August by the 7th Montenegro Youth Brigade "Budo Tomović" during Operation Rübezahl.

== Operation Rübezahl II ==
Operation Rübezahl II was a German offensive in February 1945 against Yugoslav partisans in the Slovene Littoral.

== Operation Rübezahl III ==
Operation Rübezahl III was a German offensive in March 1945 against the Yugoslav 30th 'Slovenia' Division, who was threatening the important port city of Trieste.

== Bibliography ==
- Bambara, Gino (1988). La guerra di liberazione nazionale della Jugoslavia (1941-1943). Mursia.
- Deakin, Frederick William (1972). La montagna più alta. L'epopea dell'esercito partigiano jugoslavo. Club degli editori.
- Đurišić, Mitar (1973). Sedma Crnogorska Omladinska Brigada "Budo Tomović" [Seventh Montenegrin Youth Brigade "Budo Tomović"] (in Serbian). Belgrade, Yugoslavia: Vojnoizdavački zavod. OCLC 22103728.
- Gobetti, Eric (2006). L'occupazione allegra. Gli italiani in Jugoslavia (1941-1943). Carocci.
- Bauer, Eddy (1971). Storia controversa della seconda guerra mondiale. Vol. VII. De Agostini.
- Gilas, Milovan (2011). La guerra rivoluzionaria jugoslava. 1941-1945. Ricordi e riflessioni. LEG. ISBN 978-88-6102-083-2.
