= Puračić =

Puračić Пурачић
- Village
- Location within Bosnia and Herzegovina
- Coordinates: 44°32′49″N 18°28′36″E
- Country: Bosnia and Herzegovina
- Entity: Federation of Bosnia and Herzegovina
- Canton: Tuzla
- Municipality: Lukavac

Area
  - Total: 2.59 sq mi (6.71 km^{2})

Population (2013)
  - Total: 2,909
  - Density: 1,120/sq mi (434/km^{2})

Puračić (Cyrillic: Пурачић) is a village in the municipality of Lukavac, Bosnia and Herzegovina.

== Demographics ==
According to the 2013 census, its population was 2,909.

Ethnicity in 2013
Ethnicity	Number	Percentage
Bosniaks	2,654	91.2%
Serbs	22	0.8%
Croats	16	0.6%
other/undeclared	217	7.5%
Total	2,909	100%
