= Ahmet Daca =

Yugoslav politician

Ahmet Aga Daca

Ahmet Daca (died 1945), known also as Ahmet Aga was a Yugoslav Albanian political figure of Sandžak region during World War II.

Originally from the Rugova region he later lived in Novi Pazar. He was the brother-in-law of Aćif Hadžiahmetović (Blyta), the main political figure of Sandžak during those times. Following the German capture of Novi Pazar in April of 1941 Daca took over as president of the Novi Pazar municipality and district mayor, operating under the Territory of the Military Commander in Serbia.

He created a kangaroo court to maintain order in Novi Pazar. In June 1944 he met with the Chetniks, as a representative of Albanian collaborationist forces, to agree on collaboration against the Yugoslav Partisans. By the end of World War II, with the Yugoslav Partisans liberating the region, he was arrested among many Muslim and Albanian collaborationist leaders and militiamen. Daca was executed publicly together with Hadžiahmetović on 21 January 1945, in Hadžet near Novi Pazar. Three of his sons were killed in a mass execution the same day.

Although officially considered a traitor and enemy of the people, in recent years some Sandžak politicians have made attempts to have him rehabilitated.

== Sources ==
- Живковић, Милутин Д. (2017). Санџак 1941–1943. Филозофски Фалултет, Универзитет у Београду.
