= Metaljka (Čajniče) =

- Village
- Location within Bosnia and Herzegovina
- Coordinates: 43°32′19″N 19°9′23″E
- Country: Bosnia and Herzegovina
- Entity: Republika Srpska
- Municipality: Čajniče
- Time zone: UTC+1 (CET)
  - Summer (DST): UTC+2 (CEST)

Metaljka (Serbian Cyrillic: Метаљка) is a village in the municipality of Čajniče, Bosnia and Herzegovina.
