= Brodarevo =

Brodarevo Бродарево
- Village
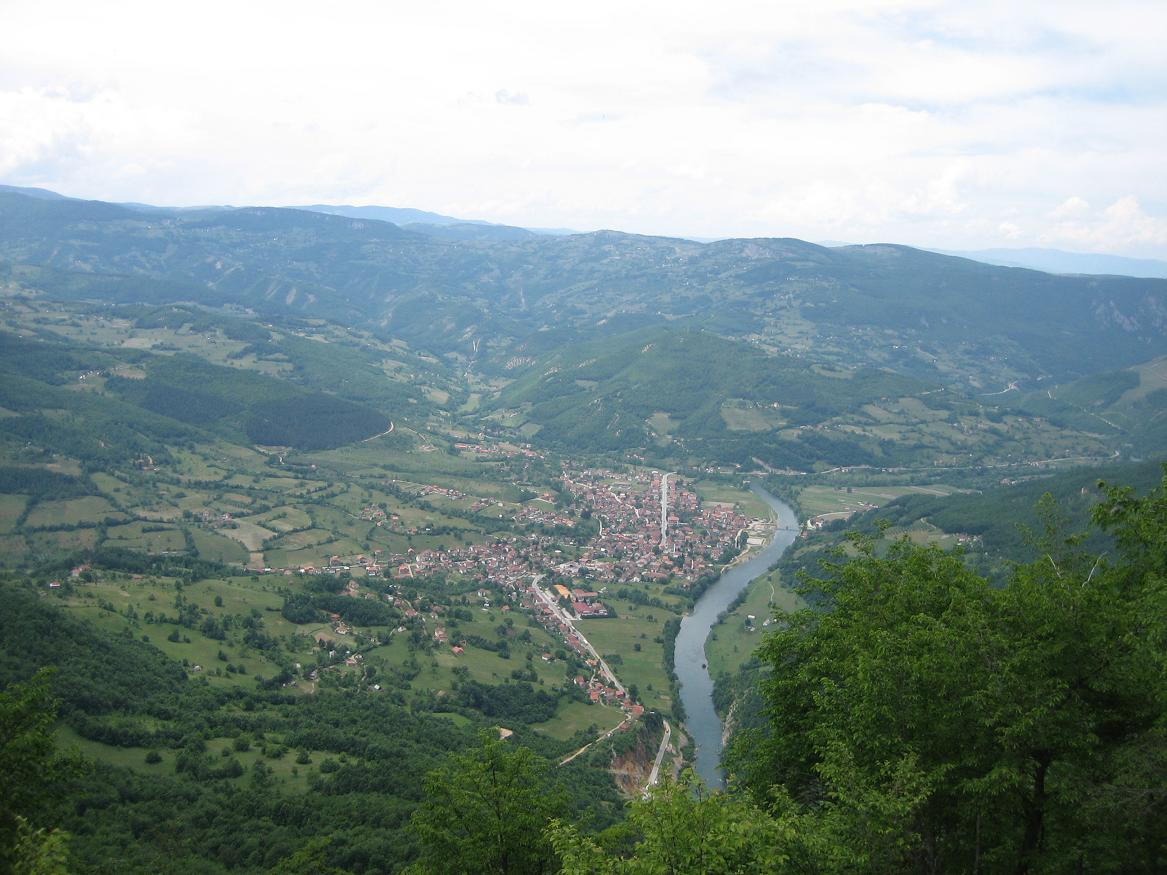

- Location within Serbia
- Coordinates: 43°13′N 19°43′E
- Country: Serbia
- District: Zlatibor District
- Municipality: Prijepolje

Area
  - Total: 6.56 km^{2} (2.53 sq mi)
- Elevation: 747 m (2,451 ft)

Population (2011)
  - Total: 1,845
  - Density: 281/km^{2} (728/sq mi)
- Time zone: UTC+1 (CET)
  - Summer (DST): UTC+2 (CEST)

Brodarevo (Serbian Cyrillic: Бродарево) is a village located in the municipality of Prijepolje, southwestern Serbia. According to the 2011 census, the village has a population of 1,845 inhabitants. A border crossing between Serbia and Montenegro is located in the village. The village has 4 schools in the area. Svetozar Marković, Nova Škola, Osnovna Škola & Predškolska Ustanova.
