= Holiest sites in Islam =

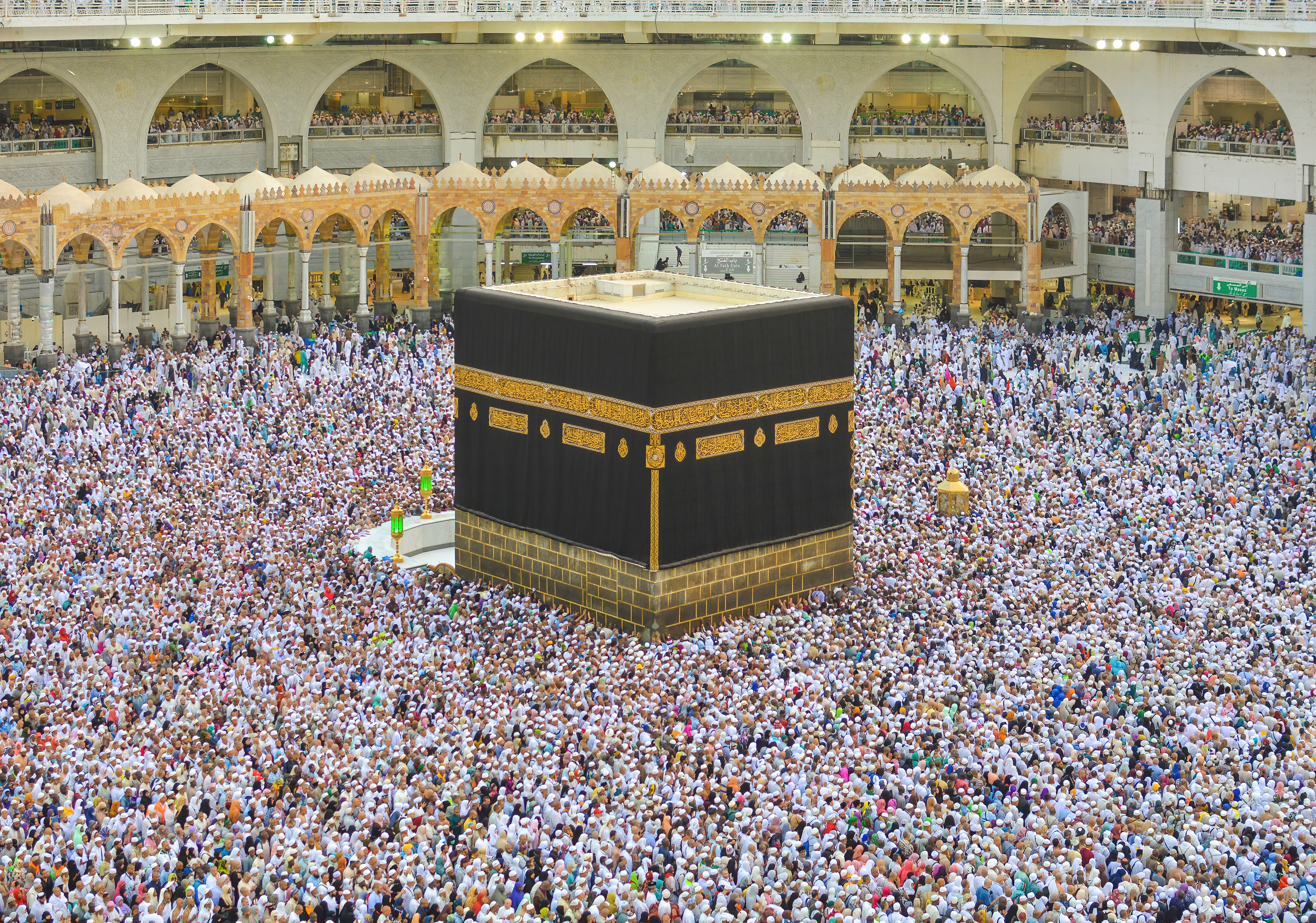
The Kaaba at Masjid al-Haram in Mecca, Saudi Arabia, is the holiest site in Islam.

The three holiest sites in Islam are generally considered to be Masjid al-Haram (including the Kaaba) in Mecca, the Prophet's Mosque in Medina, and Al-Aqsa in Jerusalem. Beyond this shared consensus across Sunni and Shia traditions, the two branches place varying degrees of religious and devotional importance on other sites.

In Sunni Islam, sites related to Muhammad's companions, certain mosques, and the graves of the founders of the Sunni schools, have spiritual significance. However, attitudes toward shrine pilgrimage vary among different Sunni schools.

In Shia Islam, sites associated with the Imamate hold an extremely high level of significance. Holy cities such as Najaf, Karbala, Mashhad, Samarra, Kadhimiya, Kufa, and Qom are major pilgrimage centers. The shrines of the Shia Imams are central to Shia devotional life and are visited by millions of pilgrims annually. Additionally, many Sunnis revere the Shia Imams, mainly because of their familial connection to the Islamic prophet Muhammad or their significance in Islamic history, and may visit their shrines out of respect and love.

== Hejaz ==
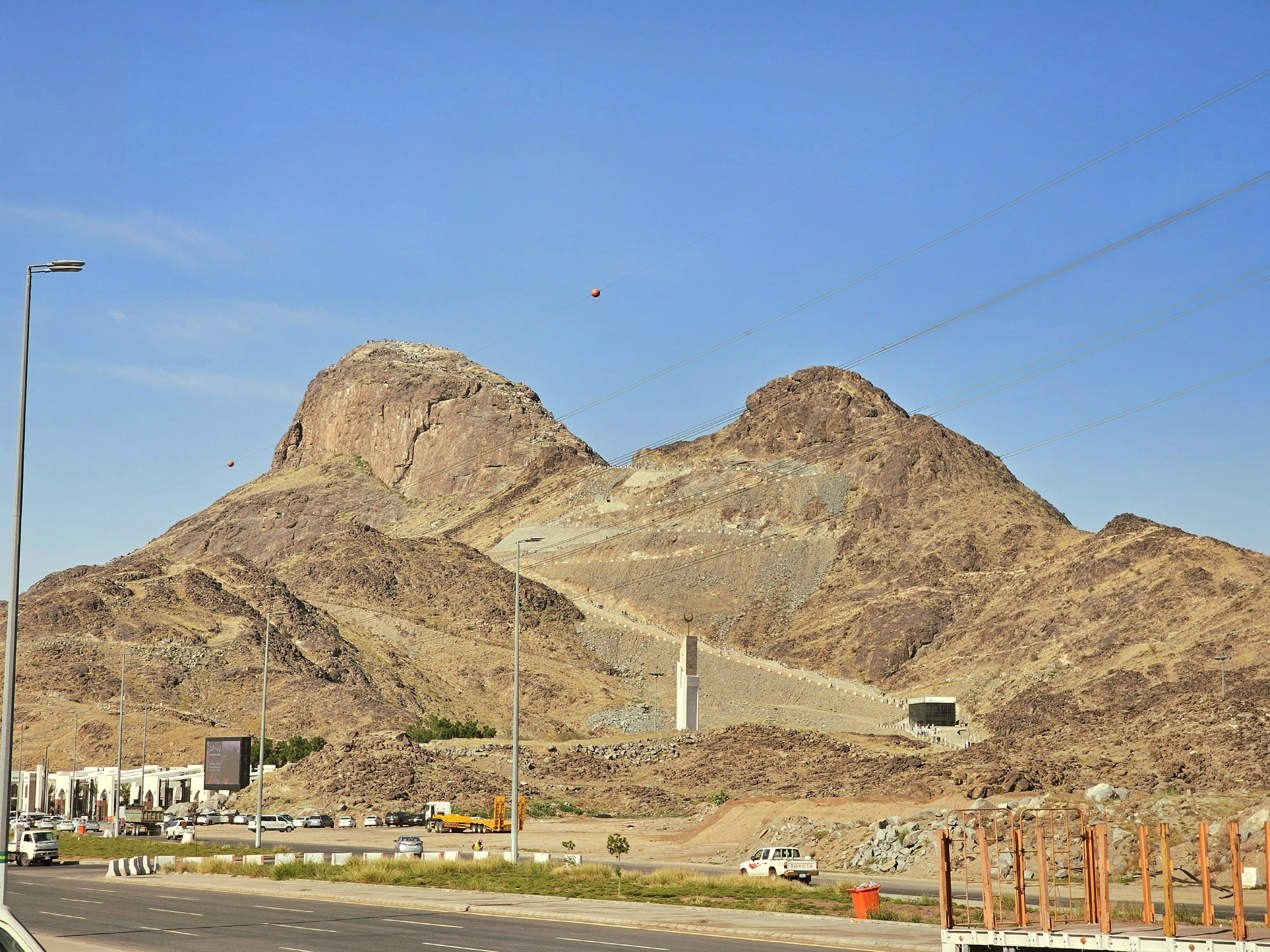
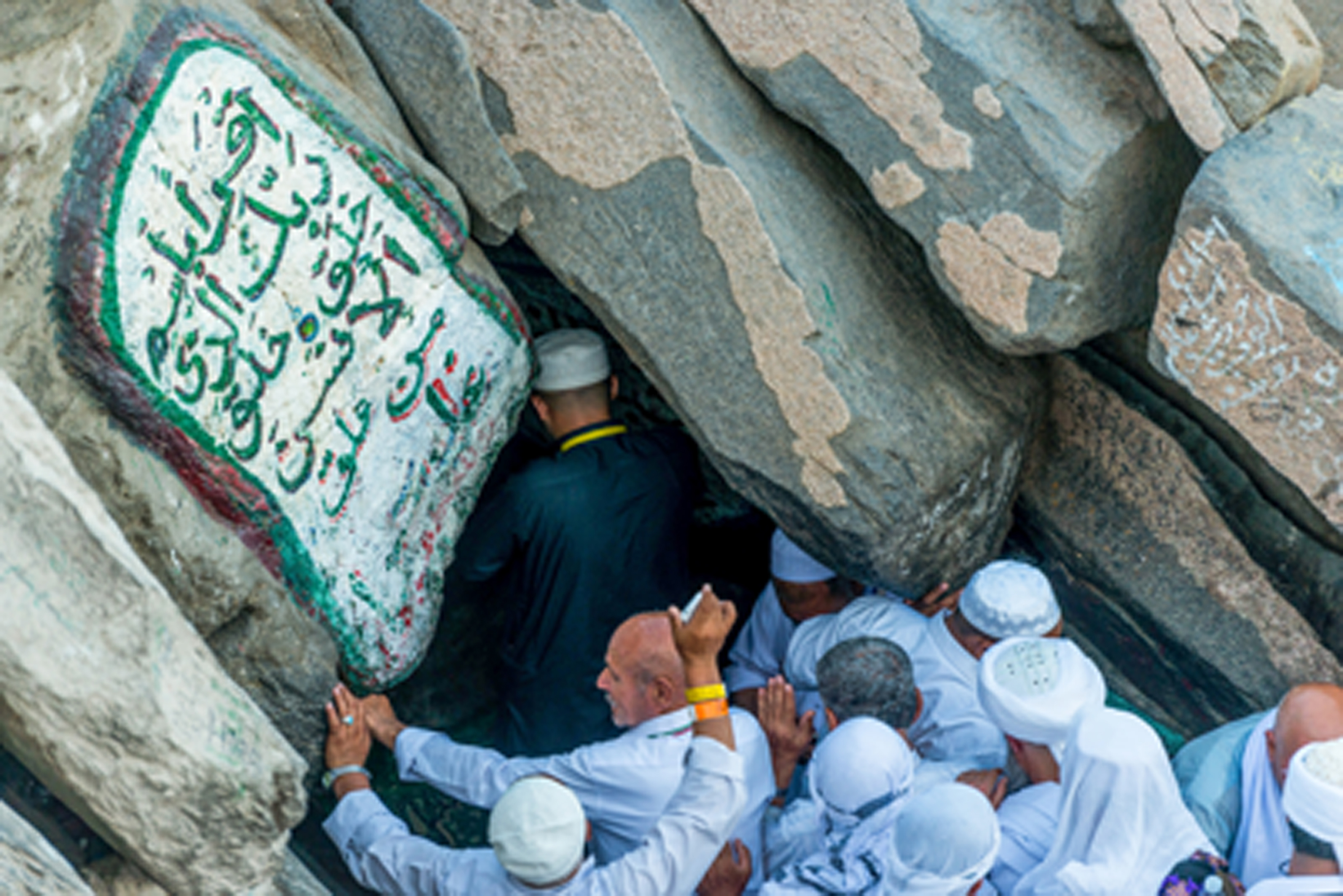
Jabal al-Nour in the Hejaz region of Saudi Arabia, where Muhammad received his first revelation in the Hira Cave, holds tremendous significance for Muslims throughout the world.

The Hejaz region in Saudi Arabia is where Mecca and Medina are located. It is where Muhammad was born and raised. The area also includes Jabal al-Nour, which holds tremendous significance for Muslims throughout the world, as it is here where Muhammad received his first revelation of the Quran, which consisted of the first five verses of Surah Al-Alaq from Gabriel.

Visitors climb the mountain daily to see the Cave of Hira, the place where Muhammad reported receiving the first revelation on the Laylat al-Qadr (night of power) from the angel Gabriel.

The two holiest cities of Islam, Mecca and Medina, are traditionally known as the Ḥaramayn, which is the dual form of ḥaram, thus meaning "The Two Sanctuaries". They should not be confused with Jerusalem and Hebron, which were also called Haramain during the Mamluk period.

=== Mecca ===
==== Masjid al-Haram ====
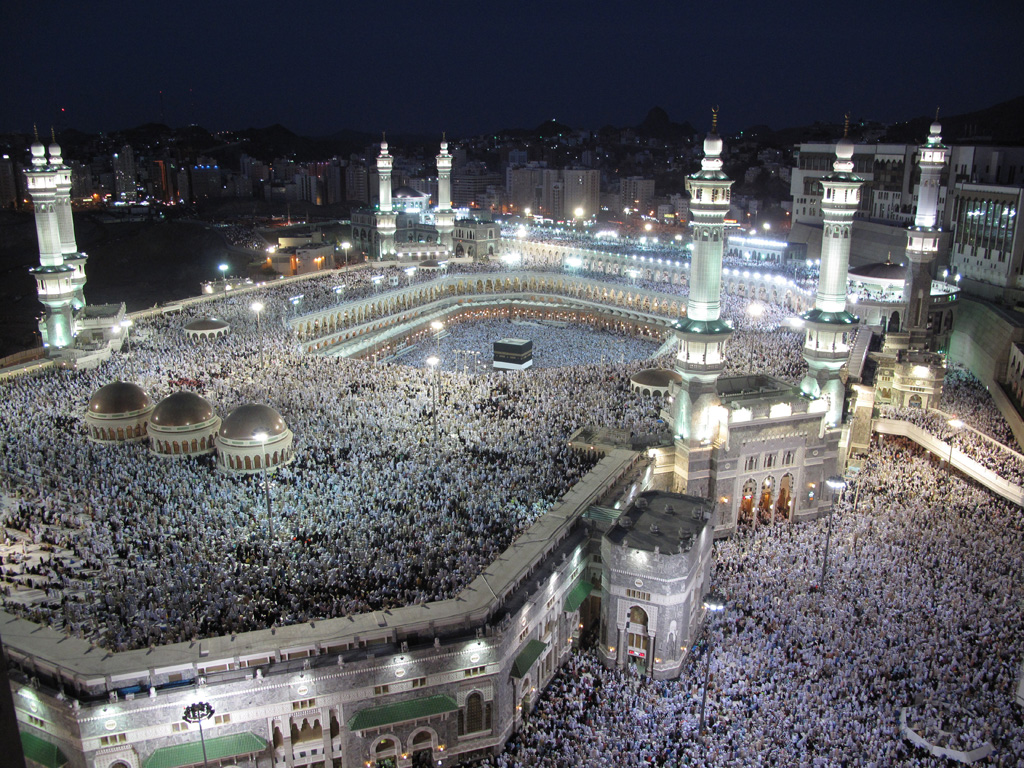
Worshippers enter in Masjid al-Haram, including its roof, and all the areas around it during hajj in Mecca.

Mecca is the holiest city in Islam, as it is the birthplace of Islam, the birthplace of Muhammad, and home to the holiest Islamic site, Kaaba in Masjid al-Haram. Only Muslims are allowed to enter the city. The rites of pilgrimages include circumambulating the Kaaba seven times. It is the qibla (direction of prayer) of the Muslims, contains the Maqam Ibrahim, Black Stone, the Zamzam Well, the hills of Safa and Marwa, Hateem, and the Al-Hajar-ul-Aswad which belonged to Adam and Eve in Paradise. The Kaaba was built by the first prophet Adam, then after Noah's Flood by Noah. It was then rebuilt by Abraham and his son Ishmael.

Muhammad played a central role in its restoration. Prior to his prophethood, Muhammad was involved in the rebuilding of the Kaaba following flood damage in 605 CE, during which he helped resolve a dispute among Quraysh clans by proposing that the Black Stone be placed on a cloth and lifted collectively, with Muhammad himself setting it in position.

After the conquest of Mecca, Muhammad entered the Kaaba and ordered the removal of its idols, dedicating the sanctuary exclusively to the worship of God. He reaffirmed Kaaba's association with Abraham and Ishmael in Islamic tradition. The area of Mecca, which also includes Mount Arafat, Mina and Muzdalifah, is important for the Ḥajj ('Pilgrimage'). As one of the Five Pillars of Islam, every Muslim who is capable must perform the Hajj at least once in their lifetime. Hajj is one of the largest annual gatherings in the world, second only to pilgrimages to the Shia Shrines.

==== Mount Arafat ====
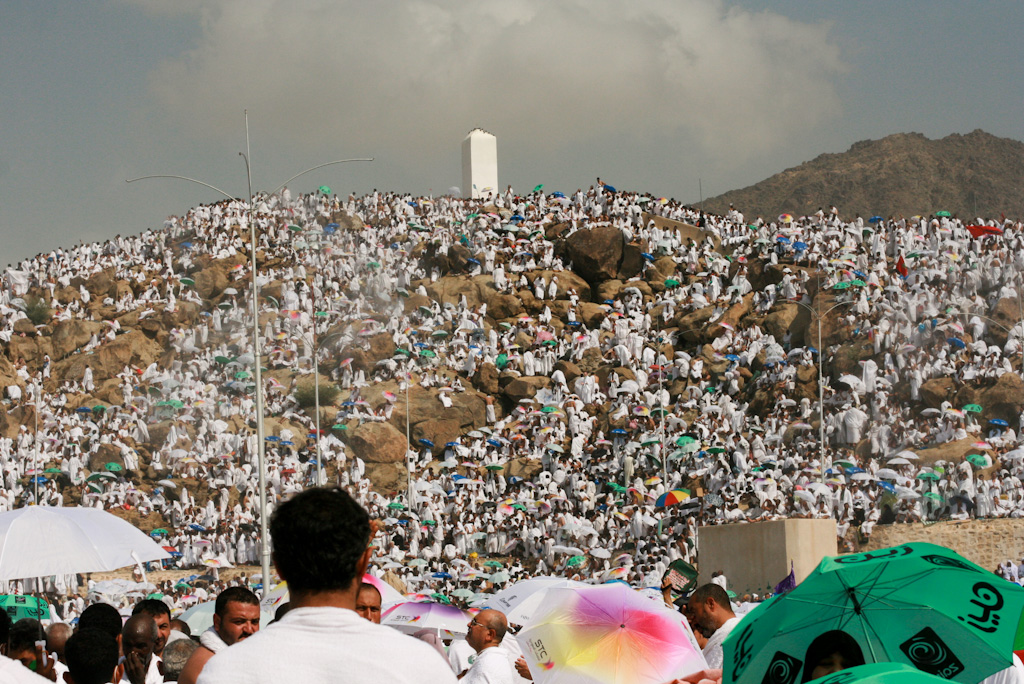
Mount Arafat near Mecca in Saudi Arabia, where Muhammad stood and delivered the farewell sermon towards the end of his life. Some Muslims believe that it is also the place where Adam and Eve reunited on Earth.

Mount Arafat is a granodiorite hill about 20 km southeast of Mecca, where Muhammad stood and delivered the Farewell Sermon to his companions who had accompanied him for the Hajj towards the end of his life.

Some Muslims also believe that Mount Arafat is the place where Adam and Eve reunited on Earth after falling from Heaven, believing the mountain to be the place where they were forgiven. A pillar is erected on top of the mountain to show where this event is believed to have taken place.

The mountain is especially important during the Hajj, with the 9th day of the Islamic month of Dhu al-Hijjah, also known as the Day of 'Arafah after the mountain itself, being the day when Hajj pilgrims leave Mina for Arafat; this day is considered to be the most important day of the Hajj. The khuṭbah (sermon) is delivered and ẓuhr and ʿaṣr prayers are prayed together in the valley. The pilgrims spend the whole day on the mountain invoking God to forgive their sins.

=== Medina ===
==== The Prophet's Mosque ====
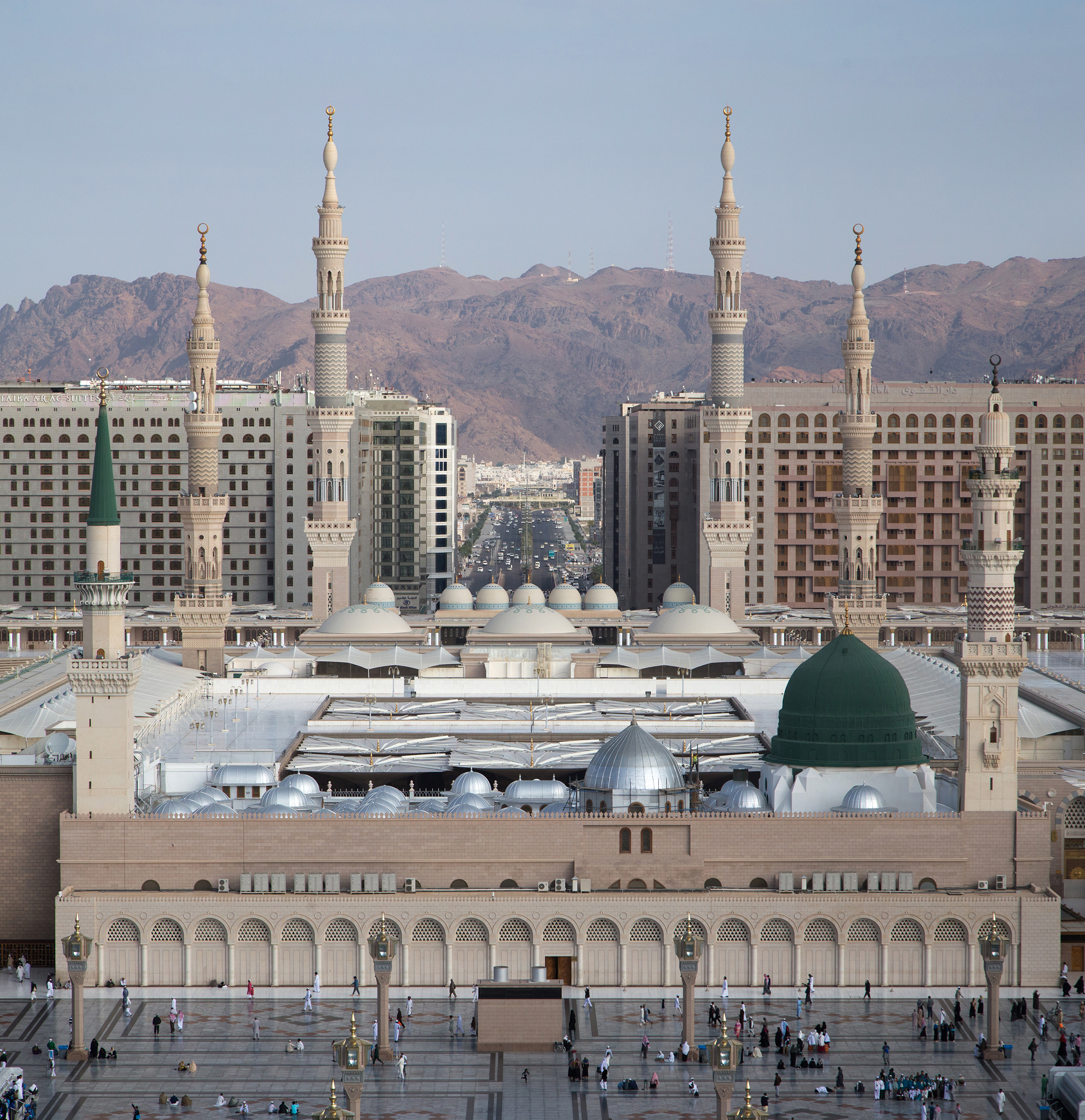
The Prophet's Mosque in Medina, Saudi Arabia, is the second holiest site. Muhammad himself was involved in the mosque's construction, and its Green Dome is where his tomb is located.

The Prophet's Mosque in Medina, Saudi Arabia, is the second holiest site in Islam. Muhammad himself was involved in the construction of the mosque. The mosque's land originally belonged to two young orphans, Sahl and Suhayl, and when they learned that Muhammad wished to acquire their land to build a mosque, they went to Muhammad and offered the land to him as a gift; Muhammad insisted on paying a price for the land because they were orphaned children. The price agreed upon was paid by Abu Ayyub al-Ansari, who thus became the endower or donor of the mosque, on behalf of Muhammad.

Originally an open-air building, the mosque served as a community center, a court of law, and a religious school. It contained a raised platform or pulpit (minbar) for the people who taught the Quran and for Muhammad to give the Friday sermon (khutbah). Subsequent Islamic rulers greatly expanded and decorated the mosque, naming its walls, doors and minarets after themselves and their forefathers.

One of the most notable parts of the mosque is its Green Dome, where the tomb of Muhammad is located. Many pilgrims who perform the Hajj also go to Medina to visit the Green Dome. The mosque also includes the tombs of Abu Bakr and Umar. In 1909, under the reign of Ottoman Sultan Abdul Hamid II, it became the first place in the Arabian Peninsula to be provided with electrical lights.

==== The Quba Mosque ====
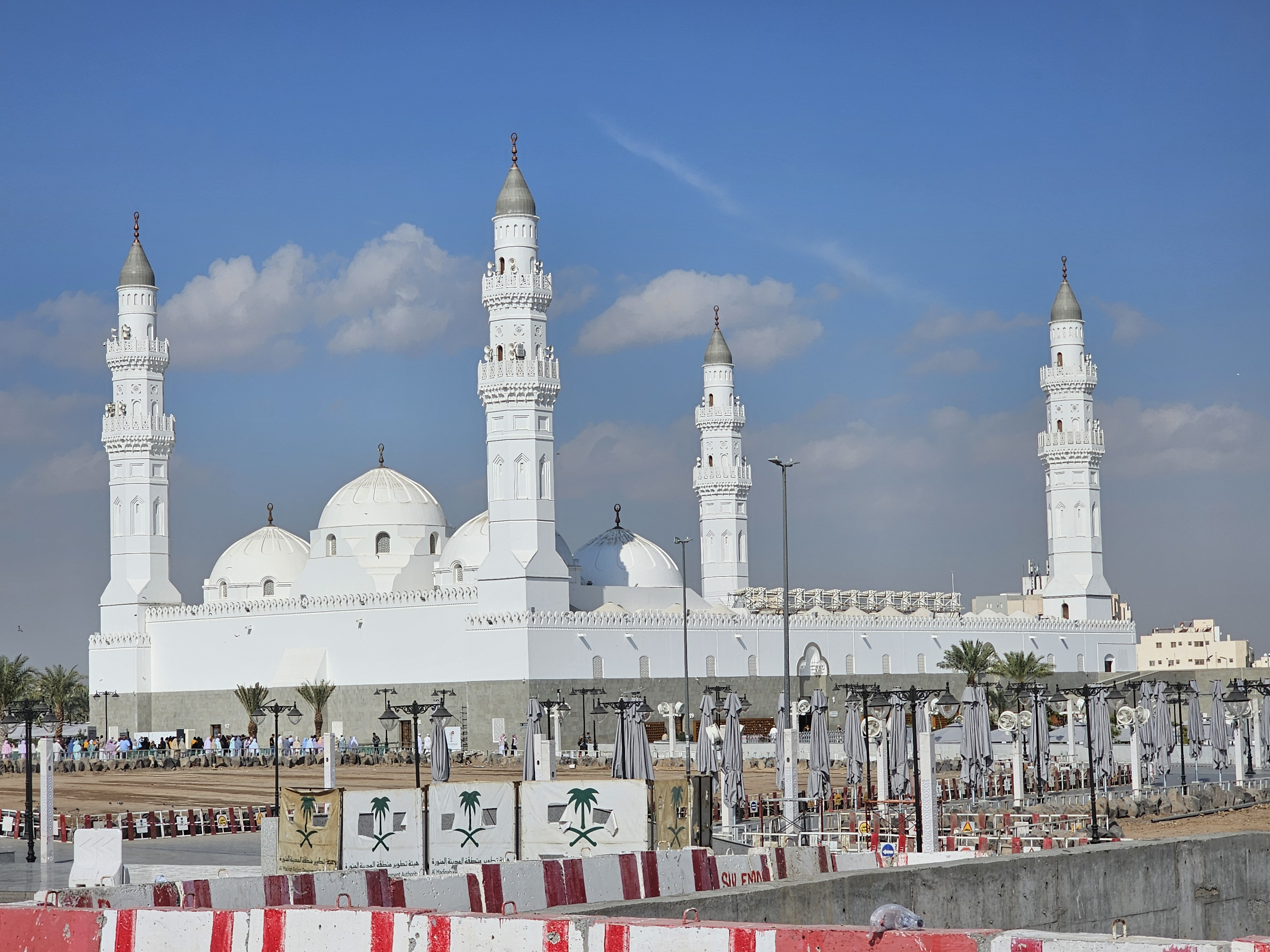
The Quba Mosque in Medina, Saudi Arabia, was the first mosque built by Muhammad, established on the first day of his hijra (emigration). Muhammad himself laid its first stone, and the structure was completed by his companions.

The Quba Mosque, located on the outskirts of Medina, Saudi Arabia, holds the distinction of being the first mosque in the world. It was founded in 622 CE by Muhammad upon his arrival in the vicinity of Medina during the hijra (migration from Mecca). He is reported to have personally participated in laying its foundations.

The mosque is frequently mentioned in Islamic tradition due to its association with piety and ritual purity. Several hadiths state that performing prayer in Quba Mosque carries special merit. The Quran makes reference to a mosque “founded on righteousness from the first day,” which many classical commentators associate with Quba.

==== Masjid al-Qiblatayn ====
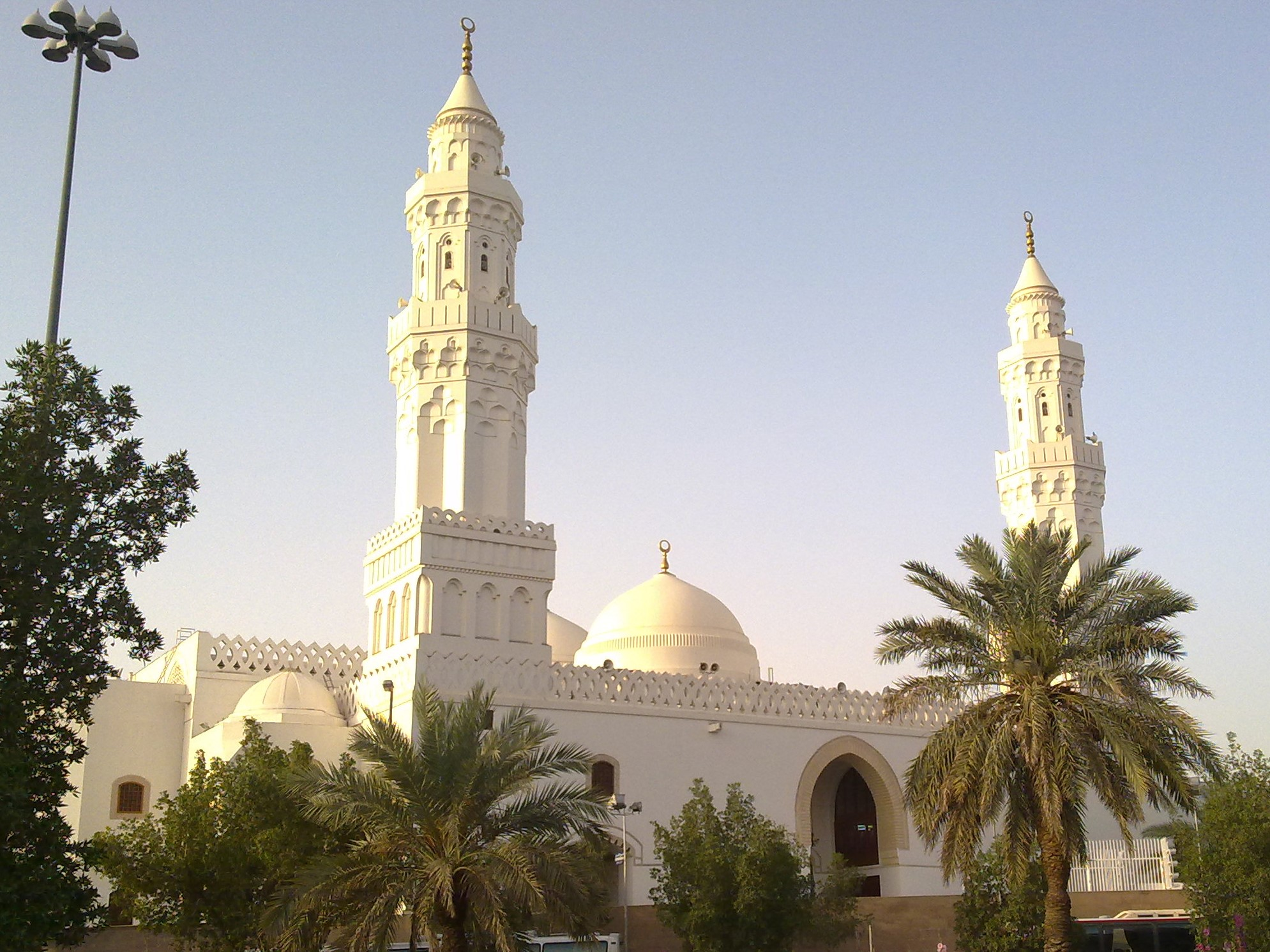
Masjid al-Qiblatayn in Medina, Saudi Arabia, is believed to be the place where Muhammad received God’s command to change the qibla (direction of prayer) from Jerusalem to Mecca.

Masjid al-Qiblatayn, located in Medina, Saudi Arabia, is renowned for its association with a pivotal moment in Islam.

The mosque is traditionally identified as the place where Muhammad received the revelation instructing Muslims to change the direction of prayer (qibla) from Jerusalem to Mecca. The event occurred approximately 16–17 months after the Hijra.

The mosque symbolized the transition of Islam from its early phase toward a distinct religious community with Mecca as its spiritual center. For this reason, Masjid al-Qiblatayn occupies a special place in Islamic memory.

== Levant ==
=== Jerusalem ===
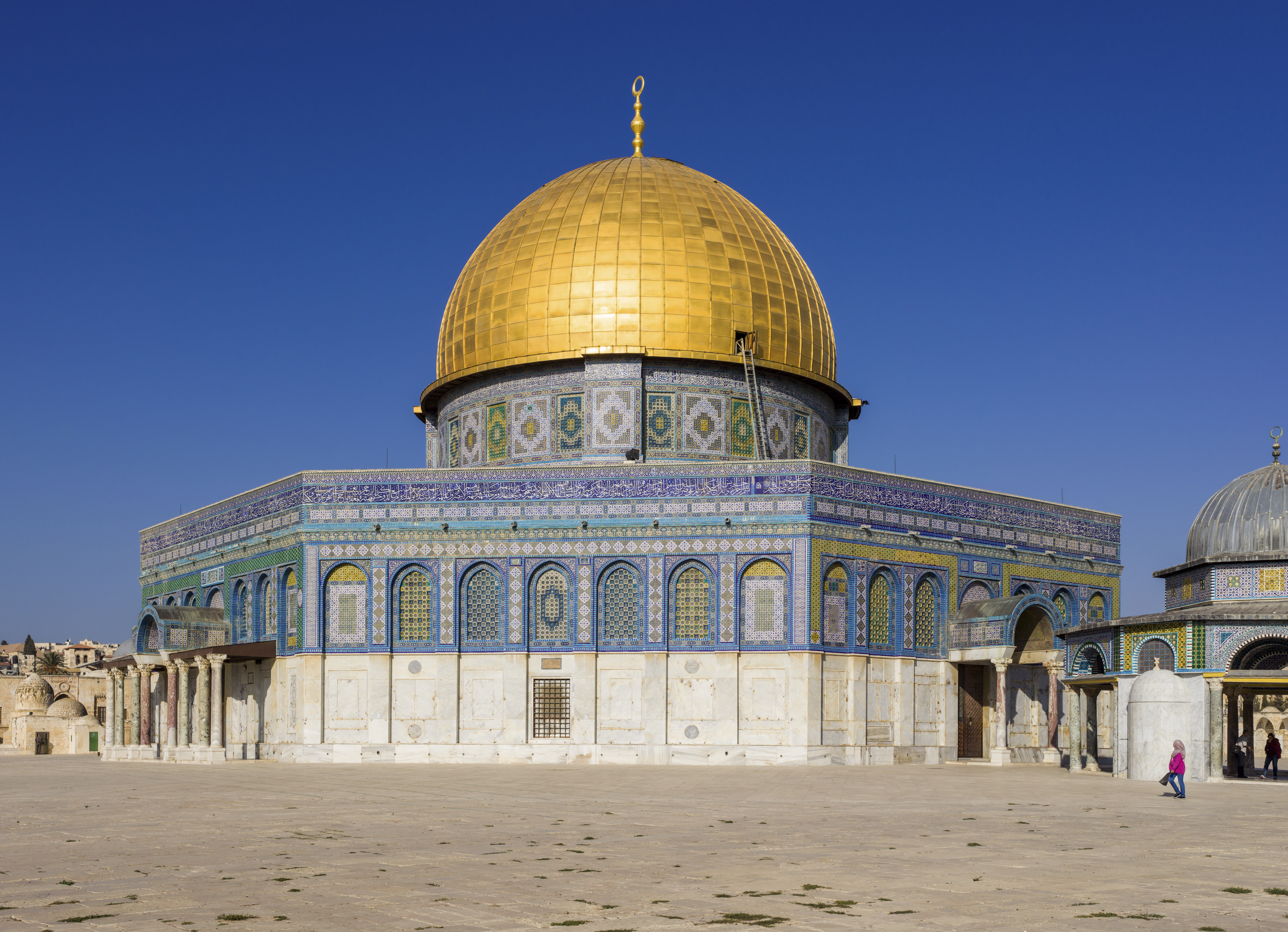
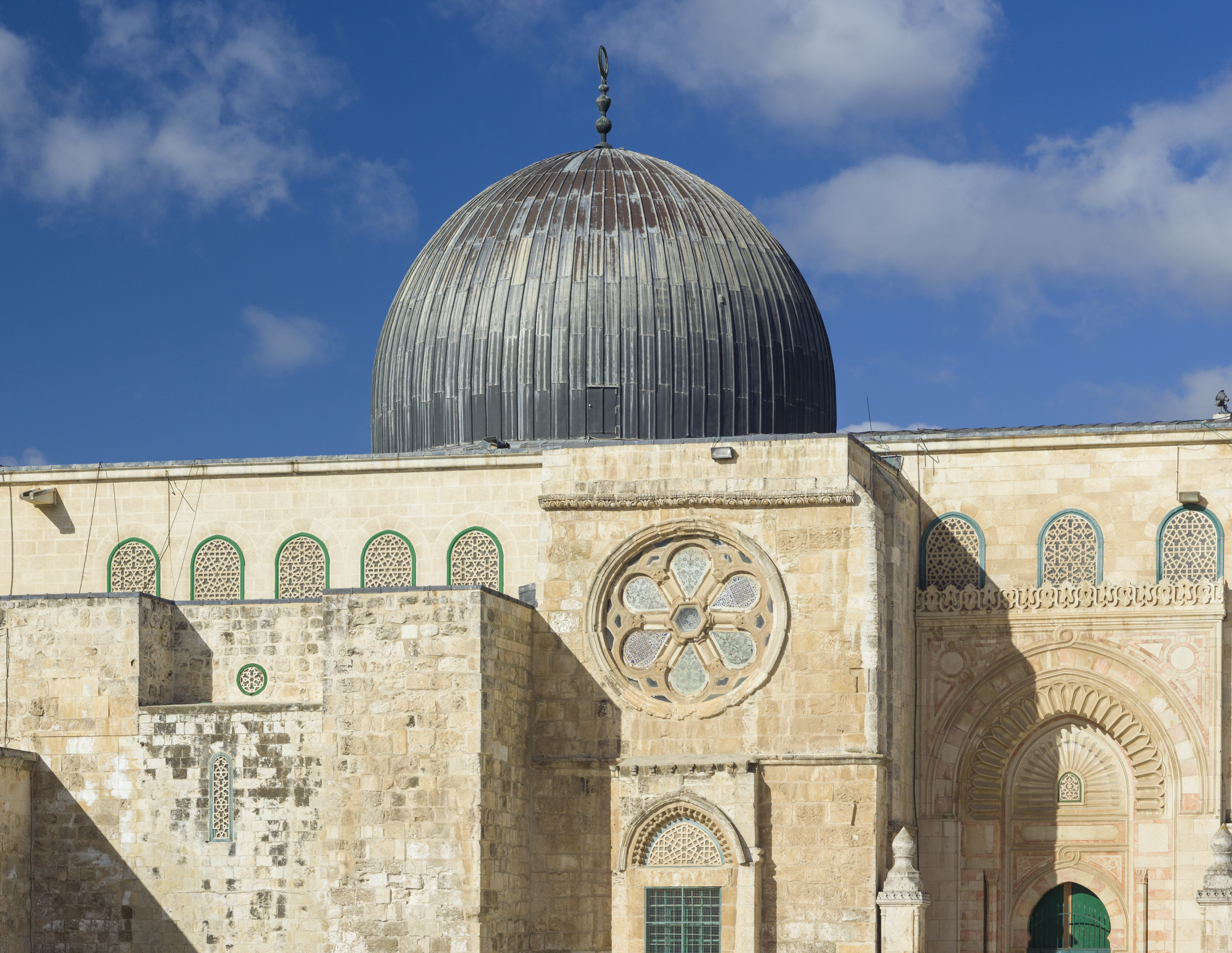
Al-Aqsa in Jerusalem (also known as the Haram Al-Sharif or Temple Mount) includes the Dome of the Rock (left) and Al-Aqsa Mosque (right). It is the third holiest site, where Muhammad ascended into heaven during a night journey, had a vision of the afterlife, and returned. The mosque was the initial qibla (direction of prayer), before it was changed to the Kaaba in Mecca as a result of a revelation to Muhammad.

Al-Aqsa in Jerusalem, also known as the Haram al-Sharif or the Temple Mount, is where Muhammad ascended bodily into heaven. It is the third-holiest site in Islam, held in esteem by all Muslims due to its history as a place of worship by many prophets such as Abraham, David, Solomon, Elijah and Jesus.

In early history, Muslims faced in the general direction of the Temple Mount as the initial qibla (direction of prayer) before changing the direction to face the Kaaba; a result of a Quranic verse revelation to Muhammad.

It is believed that expressions without a subject in verses 1–18 of Surāh an-Najm and some verses of the 17th chapter of the Quran, commonly called Surāh al-’Isrā’, allude to the night journey. In 610 CE, over the night of the Isra' and Mi'raj, Muhammad was taken from the Masjid al-Haram in Mecca to visit Al-Aqsa Mosque ("the Furthest Mosque"), where he led the prayer among the prophets, and was then taken to the heavens from the Foundation Stone. The "Furthest Mosque" has been mentioned in the Quran once, in verse 1 of Surat al-Isra'.

=== Damascus ===
The Umayyad Mosque in Damascus, Syria, where Muslims and Christians alike consider it a holy site. According to Islam, Isa (Jesus) will appear there near the Day of Judgment. Both Christianity and Islam regard the mosque as the burial place of the head of John the Baptist, revered in Islam as Yahya.

The Umayyad Mosque in Damascus, Syria, is a holy site in Islam. The head of John the Baptist, revered in Islam as the prophet Yahya, is believed to be inside the mosque, which also houses one of only four original copies of the Quran. Prayers in the Umayyad mosque are considered to be equal to those offered in Al-Aqsa Mosque.

The Mosque is also the place where Muslims believe Isa (Jesus) will return at the end of times, atop the "Minaret of Isa" of the mosque, during the time of a Fajr prayer. Muslims and Christians alike consider the site a holy place.

The mosque also holds a special importance in Shia Islam since it contains shrines commemorating Husayn, whose martyrdom is frequently compared to that of John the Baptist. There is a location in the mosque where Husayn's head was kept. Furthermore, the surviving members of his family were imprisoned in the mosque for 60 days.

=== Hebron ===
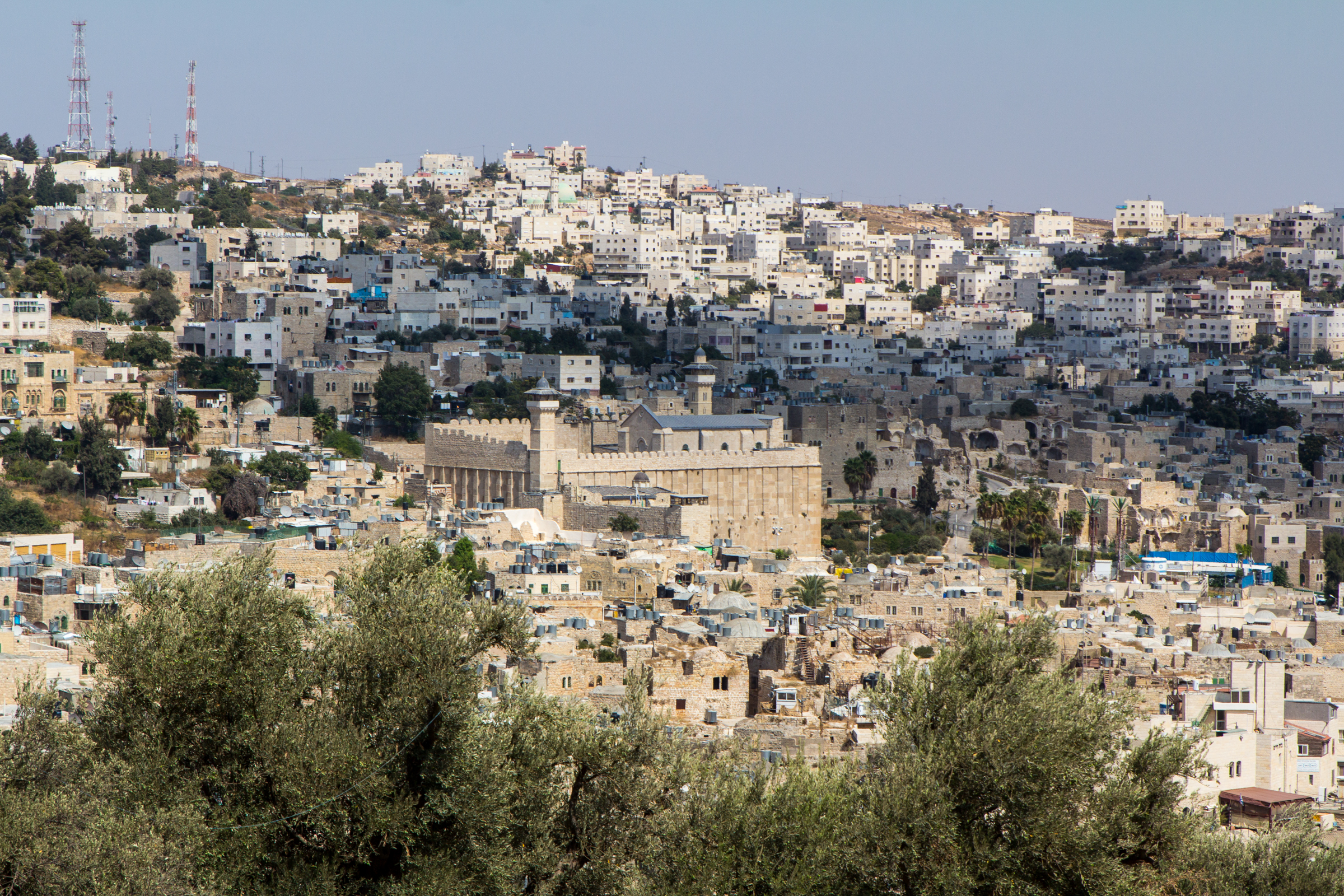
The Ibrahimi Mosque in Hebron, Palestine, the city which according to Islam, was where Abraham settled. Muslims believe that Muhammad visited Hebron on his night journey from Mecca to Jerusalem.

According to Islam, Hebron was where Abraham settled. Within the city lies the Cave of the Patriarchs, the traditional burial site of the biblical Patriarchs and Matriarchs in both Islam and Judaism, and the Ibrahimi Mosque, built on top of the tomb to honor Abraham, is often considered by some Sunni Muslims to be the fourth holiest site in Islam.

Muslims believe that Muhammad visited Hebron on his night journey from Mecca to Jerusalem to stop by the tomb and pay his respects. There is also a left footprint in a small niche at the mosque, believed to be from Muhammad.

During the first century BCE, Herod the Great built the wall that still surrounds the Cave of the Patriarchs, which later became a church, and then a mosque. Hebron is one of the oldest continuously inhabited cities in the Levant.

== Sinai Peninsula ==
The Sinai Peninsula is associated with the prophets Harun (Aaron) and Musa (Moses). Numerous references to Mount Sinai exist in the Quran, where it is called Ṭūr Saināʾ, Ṭūr Sīnīn, and aṭ-Ṭūr and al-Jabal (both meaning "the Mount"). As for the adjacent Wād Ṭuwā (Valley of Tuwa), it is considered as being muqaddas (sacred), and a part of it is called Al-Buqʿah Al-Mubārakah ("The Blessed Place").

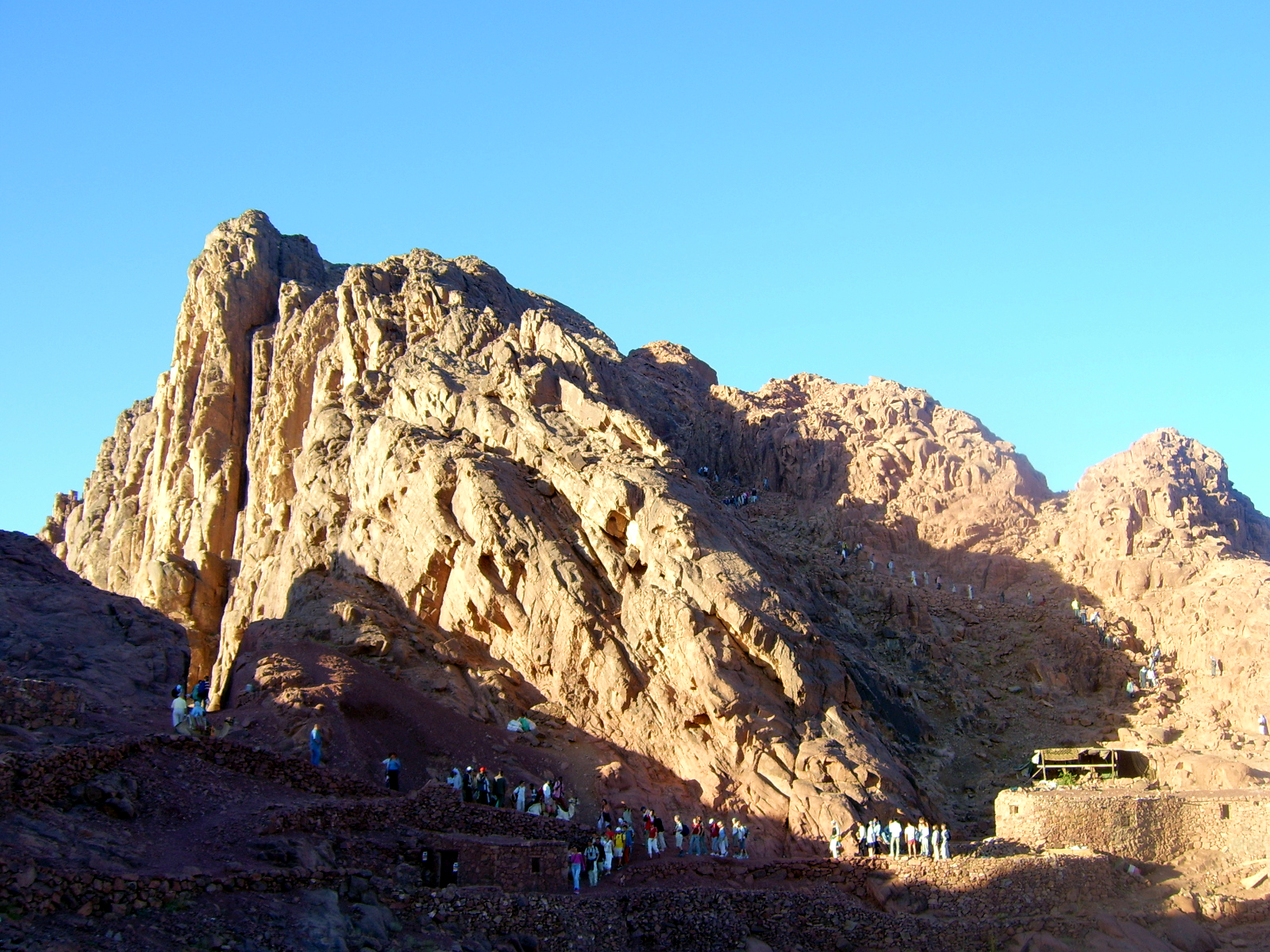
Mount Sinai in the Asian part of present-day Egypt. It is the place where, according to the Torah, Bible, and Quran, Moses received the Ten Commandments from God.

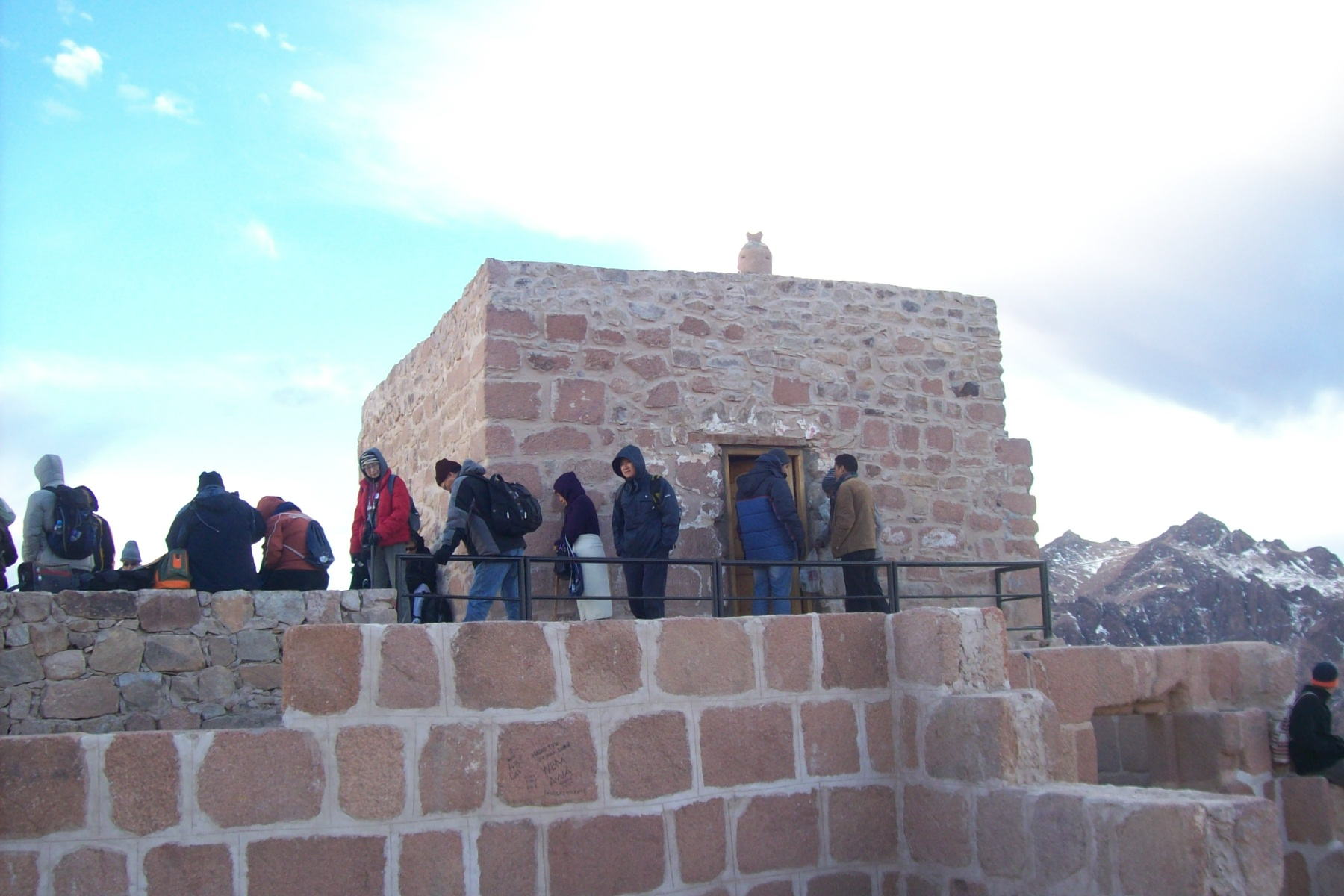
The mosque at the summit

== Sunni Islam ==
=== The Great Mosque of Kairouan ===
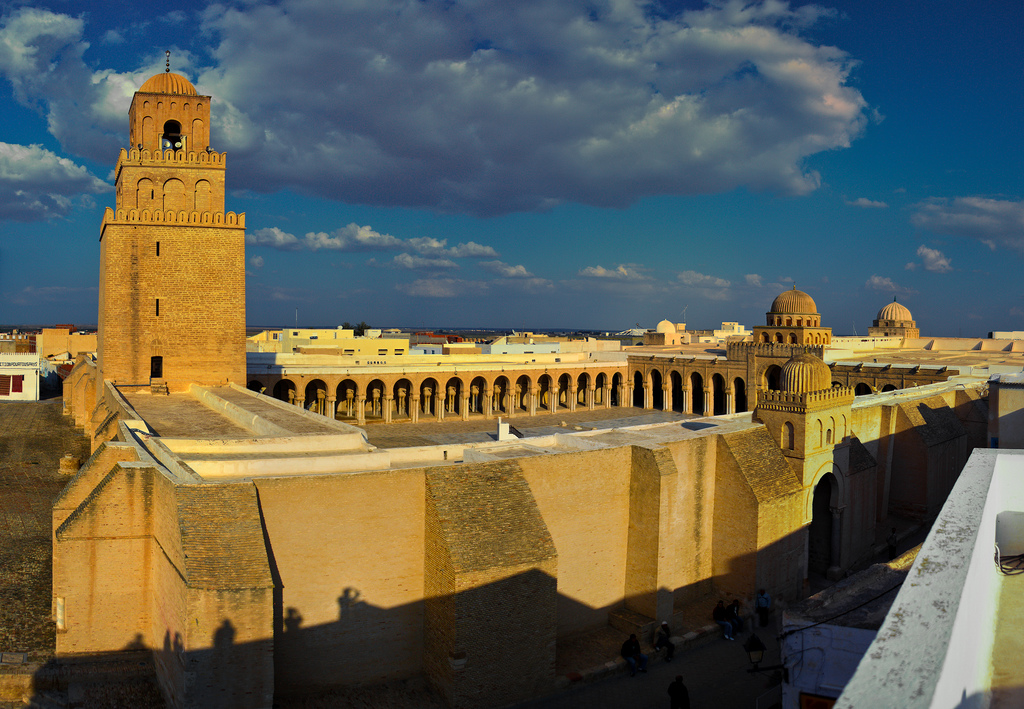
The Great Mosque of Kairouan in Tunisia, where some Sunni tradition holds that seven pilgrimages to it equals one pilgrimage to Mecca.

The Great Mosque of Kairouan is located in Kairouan, Tunisia, a city founded in 670 CE as the first Muslim stronghold in North Africa and the western Islamic world. The mosque was originally established by Uqba ibn Nafi, a companion of Muhammad.

The mosque functioned as a major center of Sunni Islamic learning, particularly for the Maliki school of jurisprudence. It played a major role comparable to later institutions such as Al-Azhar in Egypt, influencing religious scholarship throughout North Africa and al-Andalus.

The mosque is considered a masterpiece of early Islamic architecture. It features a vast hypostyle prayer hall, one of the oldest surviving minarets in Islam, a monumental courtyard, and a richly decorated mihrab. Its architectural style influenced mosque construction across the western Islamic world.

==== The Eyüp Sultan Mosque ====
The Eyüp Sultan Mosque in Istanbul, Turkey, is one of the most significant Sunni sites outside the Arabian Peninsula. It contains the tomb of Abu Ayyub al-Ansari, a close companion of Muhammad and his standard-bearer.

The shrine of Abu Ayyub al-Ansari, a close companion of Muhammad and his standard-bearer, is one of the most significant Sunni religious sites outside the Arabian Peninsula. Abu Ayyub died during the early Muslim siege of Constantinople, and his burial place later became a focal point of Sunni reverence.

Following the Ottoman conquest of Constantinople in 1453, the shrine gained major religious importance. Ottoman sultans were traditionally girded with the Sword of Osman at this site, symbolizing their Sunni legitimacy. The site holds strong historical and cultural significance within Sunni Islam.

The mosque is also important because it holds relics believed to have belonged to Muhammad. Because of the holiness attached to the mosque, many Ottoman officials and royal family members chose to be buried nearby.

=== Hanafi ===
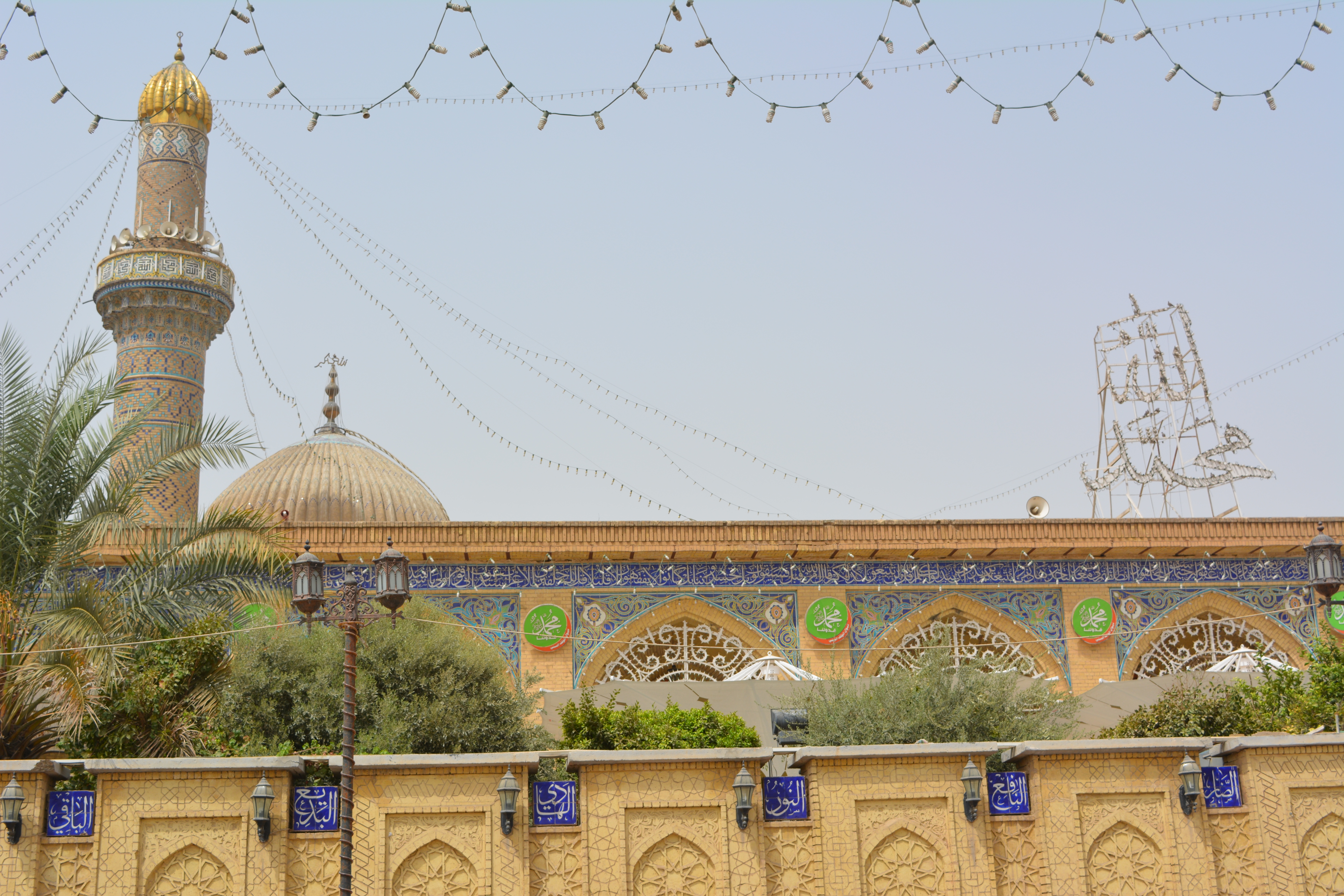
Abu Hanifa Mosque in Baghdad, Iraq, contains the tomb of Abu Hanifa, the founder of Hanafism, the largest Sunni school.

==== Abu Hanifa Mosque ====
The tomb of Abu Hanifa, founder of the Hanafi school of Sunni jurisprudence, is a major historical site reflecting the development of Sunni thought. It is located in Baghdad, Iraq. The Hanafi school or Hanafism is the largest school of Islamic jurisprudence out of the four schools within Sunni Islam. Abu Hanifa’s legal methodology profoundly influenced Islamic law across the Abbasid Caliphate, Central Asia, the Ottoman Empire, and South Asia. His burial site became associated with scholarship and Sunni legal identity, particularly in regions where the Hanafi school predominated.

=== Maliki ===
The Maliki school of Sunni Islam was founded by Malik ibn Anas. Malik is buried at Al-Baqi Cemetery in Medina. The Great Mosque of Kairouan in Tunisia is also known since the 9th century as one of the most important Maliki centers.

=== Shafi ===
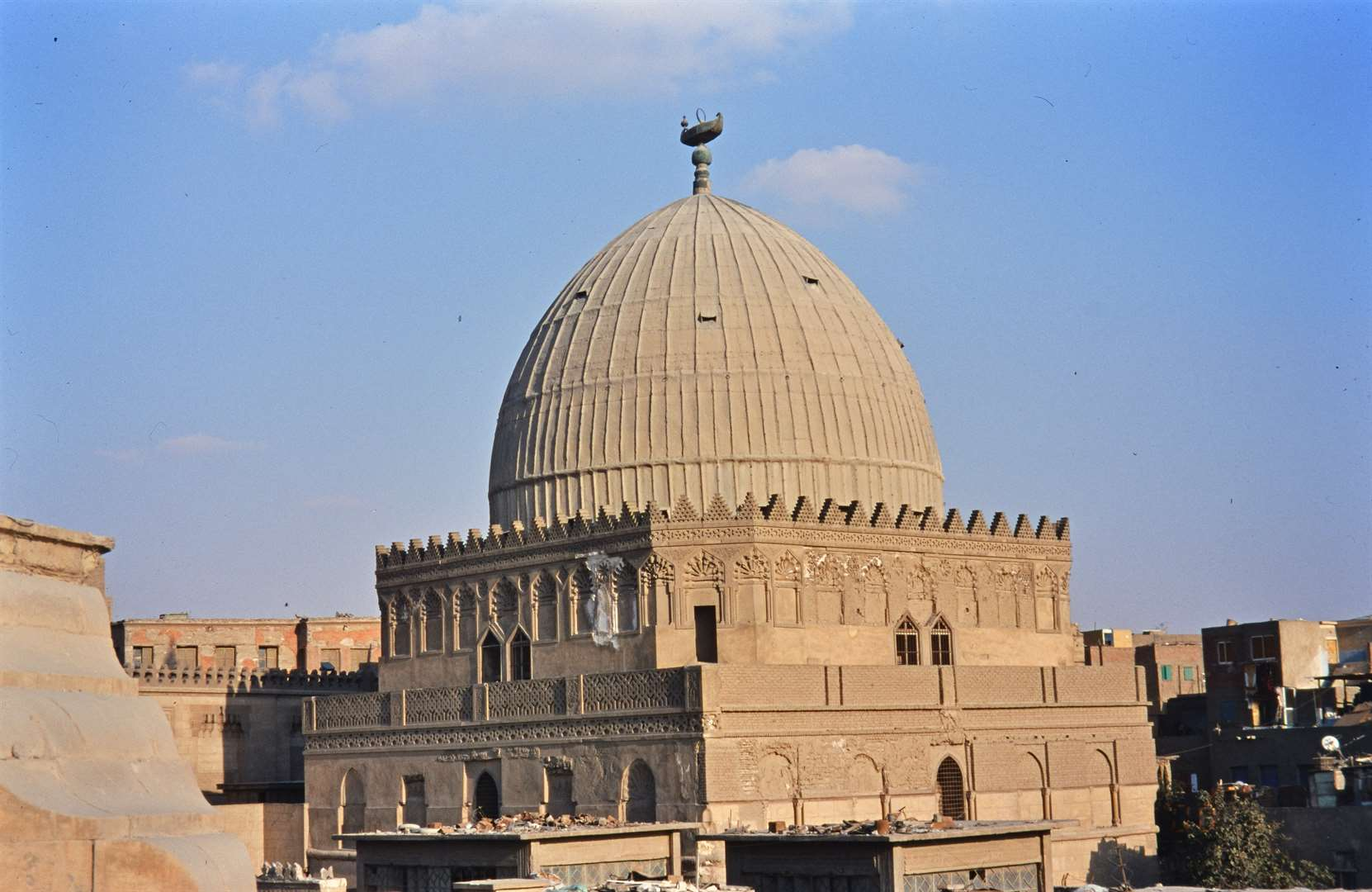
Al-Shafiʿi Shrine in Cairo, Egypt, contains the tomb of al-Shafiʿi, founder of the Shafiʿi school in Sunni Islam.

==== Al-Shafiʿi Shrine ====
The al-Shafiʿi Shrine, founder of the Shafiʿi school of Sunni jurisprudence, is one of Cairo’s most important monuments. Al-Shafiʿi played a foundational role in systematizing Islamic legal theory (uṣūl al-fiqh), and his influence extends across East Africa, Southeast Asia, and parts of the Middle East. His tomb became a major site of Sunni scholarly memory. The current mausoleum structure dates largely to the Ayyubid and Mamluk periods.

=== Hanbali ===
==== Ahmad ibn Hanbal Shrine ====
The burial site of Ahmad ibn Hanbal, founder of the Hanbali school of Sunni jurisprudence, holds strong significance in Sunni Islam. Ahmad ibn Hanbal is particularly remembered for his resistance during the Mihna, during which he upheld traditional Sunni doctrine against state-imposed theology. His legacy shaped Sunni creedal orthodoxy and later influenced movements such as Atharism.

== Shia Islam ==
=== Imam Ali Shrine ===
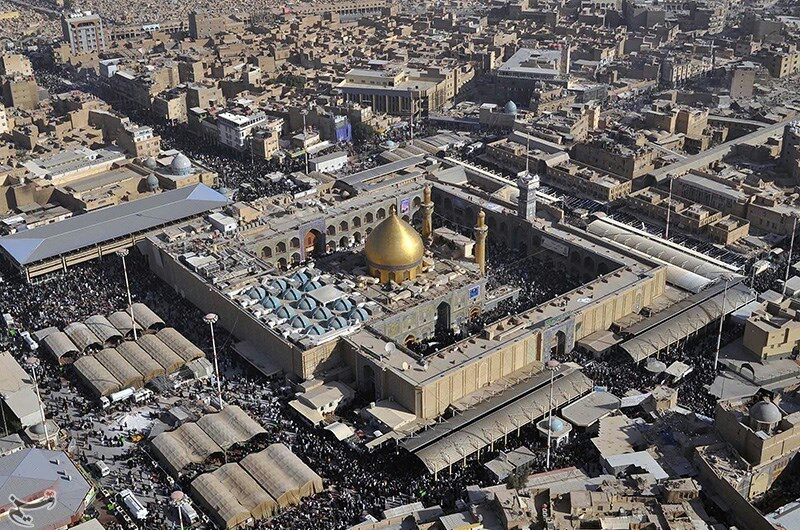
The Imam Ali Shrine in Najaf, Iraq. It contains the tomb of Ali, who was Muhammad's cousin, his son-in-law, and the first Shia Imam. Born inside the Kaaba and raised in Muhammad's household, he was among the first to accept Islam, with his status said to be second only behind Muhammad. Revered for his courage, justice, honesty, and magnanimity, Ali has become the archetype of uncorrupted Islam and pre-Islamic chivalry. Sunni Muslims regard him as the last of the Rashidun ('rightly-guided'), while Shia Muslims venerate him as Muhammad’s rightful successor.

The Imam Ali Shrine in Najaf, Iraq, is the holiest site in Shia Islam after Mecca, Medina and Jerusalem. It contains the tomb of Ali, the first Shia Imam who was also Muhammad's cousin and son-in-law. According to Shia belief, the site also contains the remains of Adam and Noah. The shrine's significance in Shia Islam is profound. All Muslims revere Imam Ali, but the Shia in particular, as a paragon of justice, knowledge, and piety. His burial site has thus become a symbol of Shia identity and faith. Every year, the shrine is visited by millions of pilgrims, with attendance peaking during Arba'in, the largest peaceful gathering in the world. Pilgrims often travel on foot from various parts of Iraq and even from neighboring countries to participate in the commemorations.

In addition to Ali, the shrine complex is the resting place for several notable figures. Among them are many revered Shia scholars, jurists, and theologians. Some of the prominent figures buried here include: Murtada Ansari, a leading Shia jurist of the 19th century, Muhammad Baqir al-Sadr, a renowned Iraqi Shia cleric and philosopher, and Abu al-Qasim al-Khoei, one of the most influential Shia marjas of the 20th century.

The shrine is also surrounded by the world's largest cemetery, Wadi al-Salam. It is believed that being buried near Imam Ali brings spiritual benefits, and many Shia Muslims request to be interred in this sacred ground. Ali was buried in Najaf following his assassination. However, the location of his grave remained a closely-guarded secret for many years. It wasn't until the Abbasid caliph Harun al-Rashid discovered the grave during a hunting expedition in the 8th century that a shrine was built at the site.

Over the centuries, the shrine has undergone numerous renovations and expansions. In the 10th century, the Buyid dynasty made significant contributions by building a large dome over the grave and adding other structures. The Safavid Empire in the 16th century also played a crucial role in further developing the shrine, adding ornate decorations, and expanding the complex. The shrine is an architectural masterpiece. It is distinguished by its golden dome and minarets, which are covered with approximately 7,777 gold tiles. The complex also includes courtyards, prayer halls, and a museum. The central hall, where the tomb is located, is adorned with intricate mirror work, mosaics, and calligraphy.

The mosque features a large courtyard, which is surrounded by arched colonnades. The main entrances, such as Bab al-Qibla and Bab al-Reza, are impressive gateways that lead directly to the inner sanctum. Many hadiths from the Shia Imams and from Muhammad highlight the importance of pilgrimage to the shrine.

Muhammad: "There is no sword but Zulfiqar, and there is no hero but Ali. Whoever visits Ali while he is alive, it is as if he has visited me; and whoever visits him after his death, it is as if he has visited me during my lifetime."

=== Imam Husayn Shrine ===
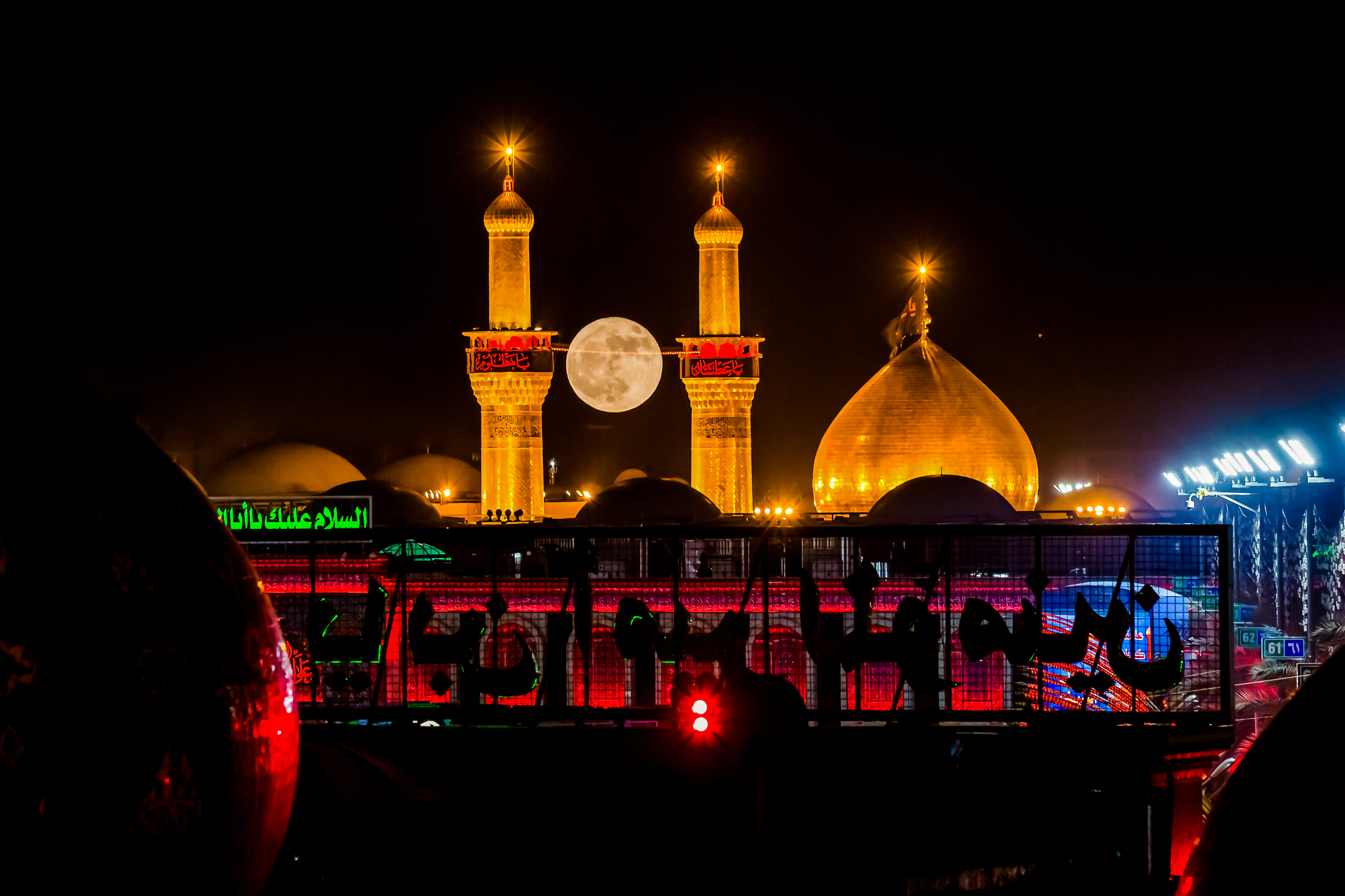
The Imam Husayn Shrine in Karbala, Iraq. It contains the tomb of Husayn, who was the son of Ali, the grandson of Muhammad, the third Shia Imam, and is regarded as a martyr by all Muslims. Husayn's suffering and martyrdom at the Battle of Karbala became a symbol of sacrifice in the struggle for right against wrong, and for justice and truth against injustice and falsehood. Each year, millions of people around the world observe Ashura during Muharram and later undertake the Arba'in pilgrimage to his shrine, the world's largest annual public gathering.

Imam Husayn Shrine in Karbala, Iraq, contains the tomb the third Shia Imam, Husayn ibn Ali. The mosque stands on the site of the grave of Husayn, where he was martyred during the Battle of Karbala. Up to 20 million pilgrims visit the city on the anniversary of Husayn's death. Husayn and his companions are regarded as martyrs by all Muslims. There are many traditions which narrate the status of Karbala.

The Shrine is a site of immense religious significance in Shia Islam. The Battle of Karbala is one of the most tragic, pivotal and defining moments in Islamic history. Husayn, along with his family and companions, was beheaded by the forces of the Umayyad caliph Yazid. The battle took place on the plains of Karbala, and Husayn’s stand against Yazid’s oppressive regime has since been revered as a symbol of resistance and martyrdom.

Following the martyrdom, the site of Husayn's grave became a major place of pilgrimage. The first structure over his grave was constructed by the order of al-Mukhtar in the late 7th century. The Shrine is renowned for its stunning architecture and intricate decorations. The complex includes a golden dome, several minarets, and expansive courtyards. The central dome is adorned with gold-plated tiles, and the interior features elaborate mirror work, mosaics, and calligraphy that depict verses from the Quran and sayings of Muhammad and the Shia Imams.

The main courtyard is surrounded by arched porticos and serves as a gathering place for pilgrims to offer prayers and recite elegies. The shrine also includes a museum that houses artifacts related to Husayn and the Battle of Karbala, as well as a library with a vast collection of Islamic manuscripts and texts. The annual Arba'in pilgrimage, which marks the end of the 40-day mourning period for Husayn, draws millions of visitors from around the world. During Arba'in, pilgrims often walk long distances, sometimes covering hundreds of miles, to reach Karbala. In addition to Arba'in, other significant occasions that draw large crowds to the shrine include Ashura durung Muharram, which is the commemoration date of Husayn's martyrdom, and the birthdays and martyrdom anniversaries of other Shia Imams.

=== Al-Abbas Shrine ===
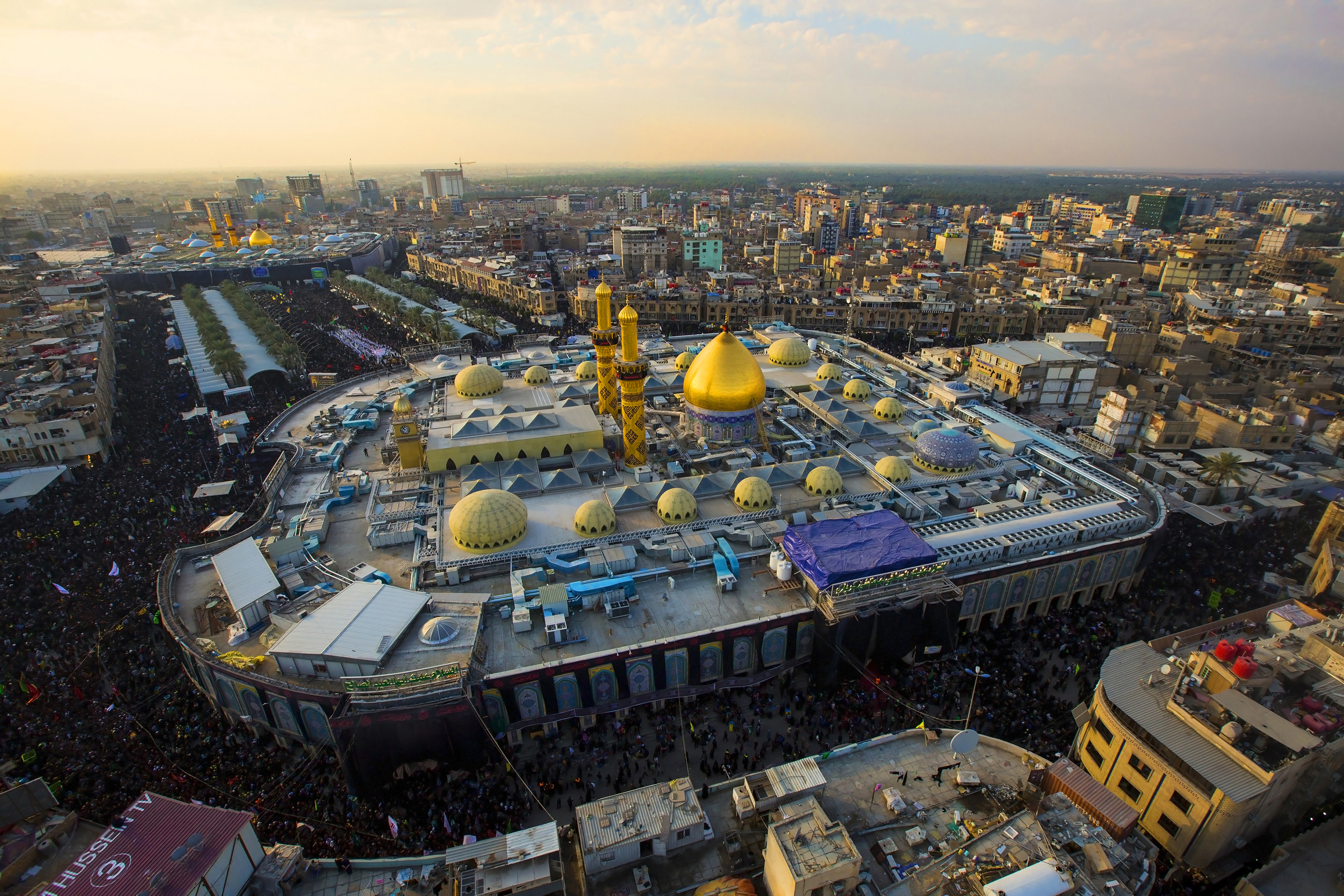
The Al-Abbas Shrine in Karbala, Iraq, stands opposite the shrine of Husayn. Abbas was a son of Ali, the half-brother of both Hasan and Husayn, and Husayn's flag-bearer. Inheriting Ali's boldness and bravery, he is revered as a paragon of ultimate courage and self-sacrifice. Abbas was martyred during the Battle of Karbala while attempting to fetch water for the thirsty children.

Al-Abbas Shrine in Karbala, Iraq, is the mausoleum of Abbas ibn Ali, a son of Ali, the half-brother of both Hasan and Husayn, and a key figure in the Battle of Karbala. Abbas is revered for his loyalty and bravery, and his shrine is one of the holiest sites in Shia Islam, attracting millions of pilgrims, especially during the annual commemoration of Arba'een. Pilgrims from around the world visit the shrine to pay their respects and seek intercession. Abbas ibn Ali, also known as Abu al-Fadl, was a respected warrior known for his unwavering support of his brother Husayn. He played a crucial role in the Battle of Karbala, where he was martyred while attempting to fetch water for the thirsty children and companions of Husayn. His sacrifice is deeply commemorated, and his shrine stands as a symbol of devotion and courage.

The construction of the shrine began in the early Islamic period, with significant contributions from various rulers. The earliest recorded construction was during the Abbasid Caliphate, with later renovations and expansions by the Safavid and Qajar dynasties. The shrine is an architectural marvel, featuring a grand golden dome and two towering minarets. It includes several courtyards, prayer halls, and a museum. The central hall, where the tomb is located, is lavishly decorated with intricate tile work, mirror mosaics, and calligraphy depicting verses from the Quran and sayings of Muhammad and the Shia imams.

The shrine is surrounded by spacious courtyards that can accommodate the influx of pilgrims during major religious events. The main entrance is an ornate gateway that leads to the inner sanctum. Inside, the walls are adorned with elaborate stucco and mirror work. The Shrine is a beacon of faith and a testament to the enduring legacy of Abbas.

=== The Great Mosque of Kufa ===
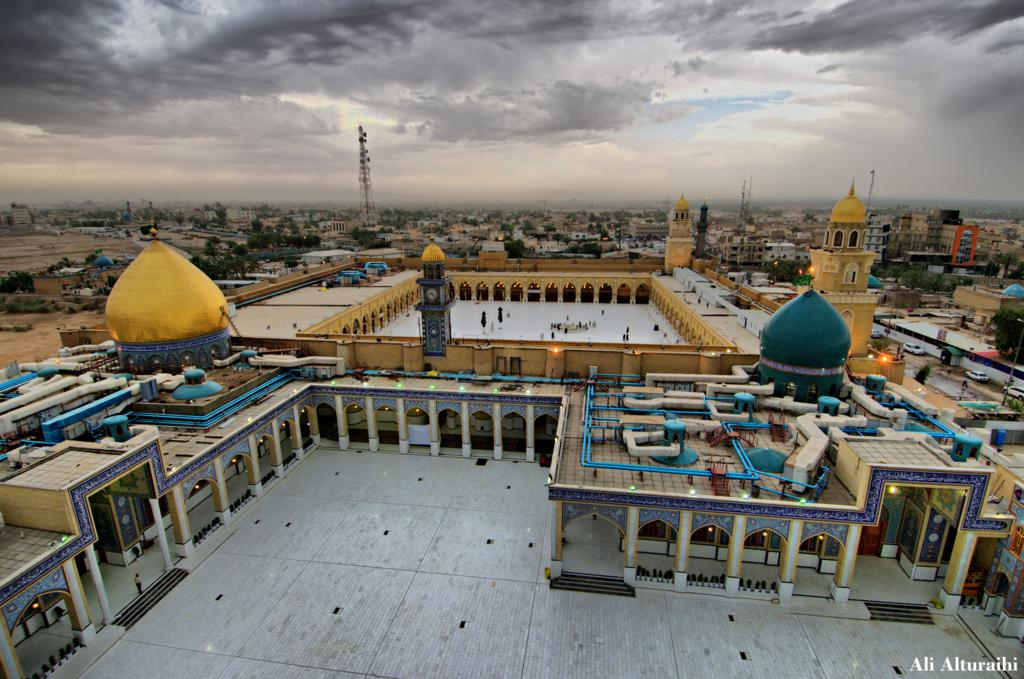
The Great Mosque of Kufa in Iraq was Ali's home, the site of his assassination, and is one of the world's earliest surviving mosques. Kufa served as the final capital of Ali during his caliphate, and the Kufic script is named for the city.

The Great Mosque of Kufa is one of the earliest surviving mosques in the world. It was home to Ali and the site of his assassination. It also contains the shrine of Muslim ibn Aqeel, his companion Hani ibn Urwa, and the revolutionary Al-Mukhtar.The mosque has been significantly rebuilt and restored multiple times in its history. Masjid al-Kufa is believed to have been built in the 7th century. The mosque holds immense religious significance for Shia Muslims. It was the place where Ali used to lead prayers and deliver sermons.

The mosque is the site where he was struck in the head with a poison-coated sword by Abd al-Rahman ibn Muljam during the month of Ramadan in 661 CE. Ali was prostrating in the Fajr prayer in the mosque when ibn Muljam struck him. The mosque is a significant pilgrimage site for Shia Muslims, especially during the anniversary of Imam Ali's death and other important Islamic events.

=== Jannat al-Baqi Cemetery ===
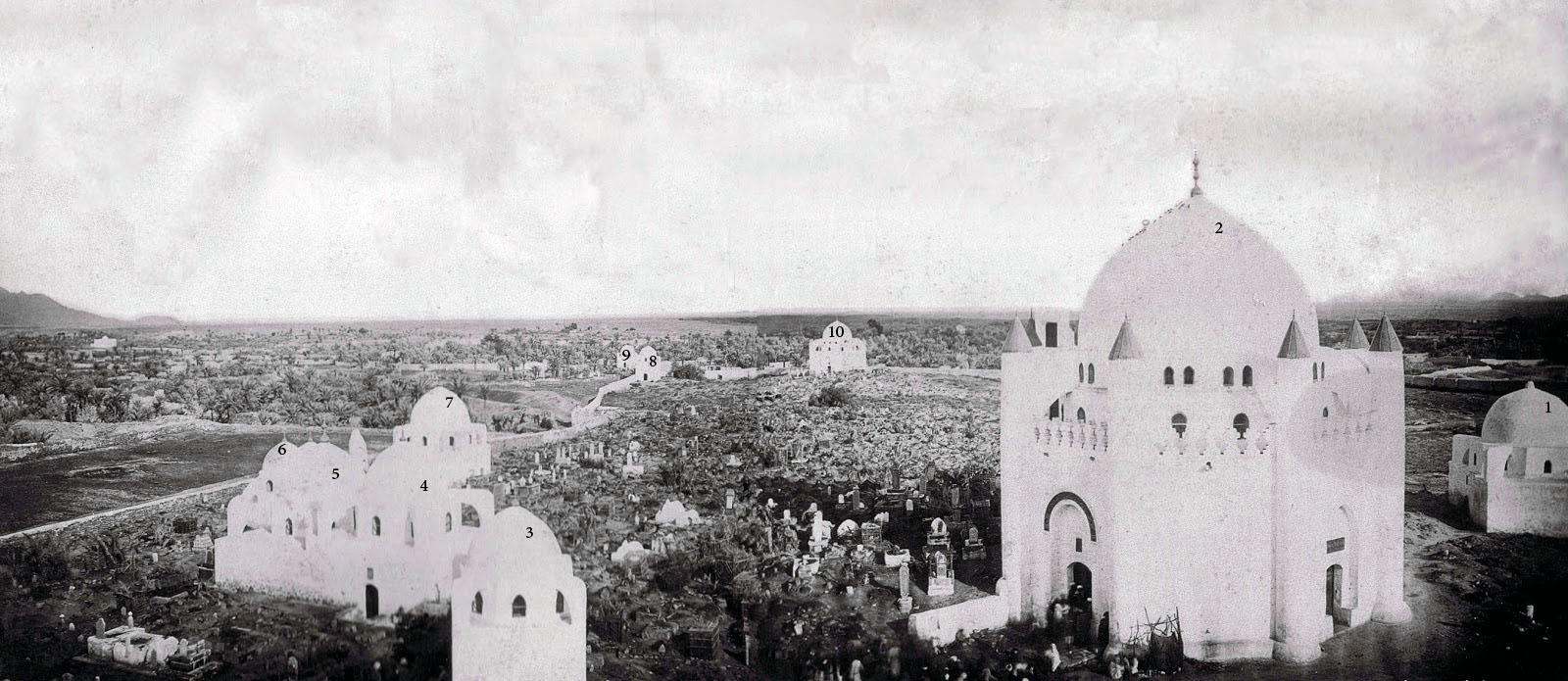
A photohraph of Jannat al-Baqi Cemetery in Medina, Saudi Arabia, before its second demolition in 1926. Mausoleums marked in the photo: 1. Fatima 2. Four Shia Imams: Hasan (2nd), al-Sajjad (4th), al-Baqir (5th), and al-Sadiq (6th) 3. Daughters of the Prophet 4. Wives of the Prophet 5. 'Aqil and Abdullah ibn Ja'far 6. Malik and Nafi' 7. Ibrahim (the little son of the Prophet) 8. Halimah al-Sa'diyyah 9. Fatimah bint Asad 10. Uthman.

Jannat al-Baqi Cemetery in Medina, Saudi Arabia, was founded by Muhammad and holds the graves of several of his family members and companions. Among them are the four Shia Imams: Hasan, al-Sajjad, al-Baqir, and al-Sadiq. When Muhammad arrived in Medina from Mecca in September 622 CE, al-Baqi was a land covered with boxthorn. After Muhammad’s arrival, the houses of Medina developed near al-Baqi, which was therefore considered the public tomb.

During the construction of the Prophet's Mosque, As'ad ibn Zurarah, one of Muhammad's companions, died. Muhammad chose the spot to be a cemetery, and As'ad was the first individual to be buried in al-Baqi among the Ansar. While Muhammad was outside Medina for the Battle of Badr, his daughter Ruqayyah fell ill and died in 624. She was buried in al-Baqi'. Ruqayyah was the first person from the Ahl al-Bayt (Household of Muhammad) to be buried in this cemetery. Shortly after Muhammad arrived from Badr, Uthman bin Maz'oon died in 624 CE and was buried in al-Baqi'. He was considered the first companion of Muhammad from the Muhajirun to be buried in the cemetery.

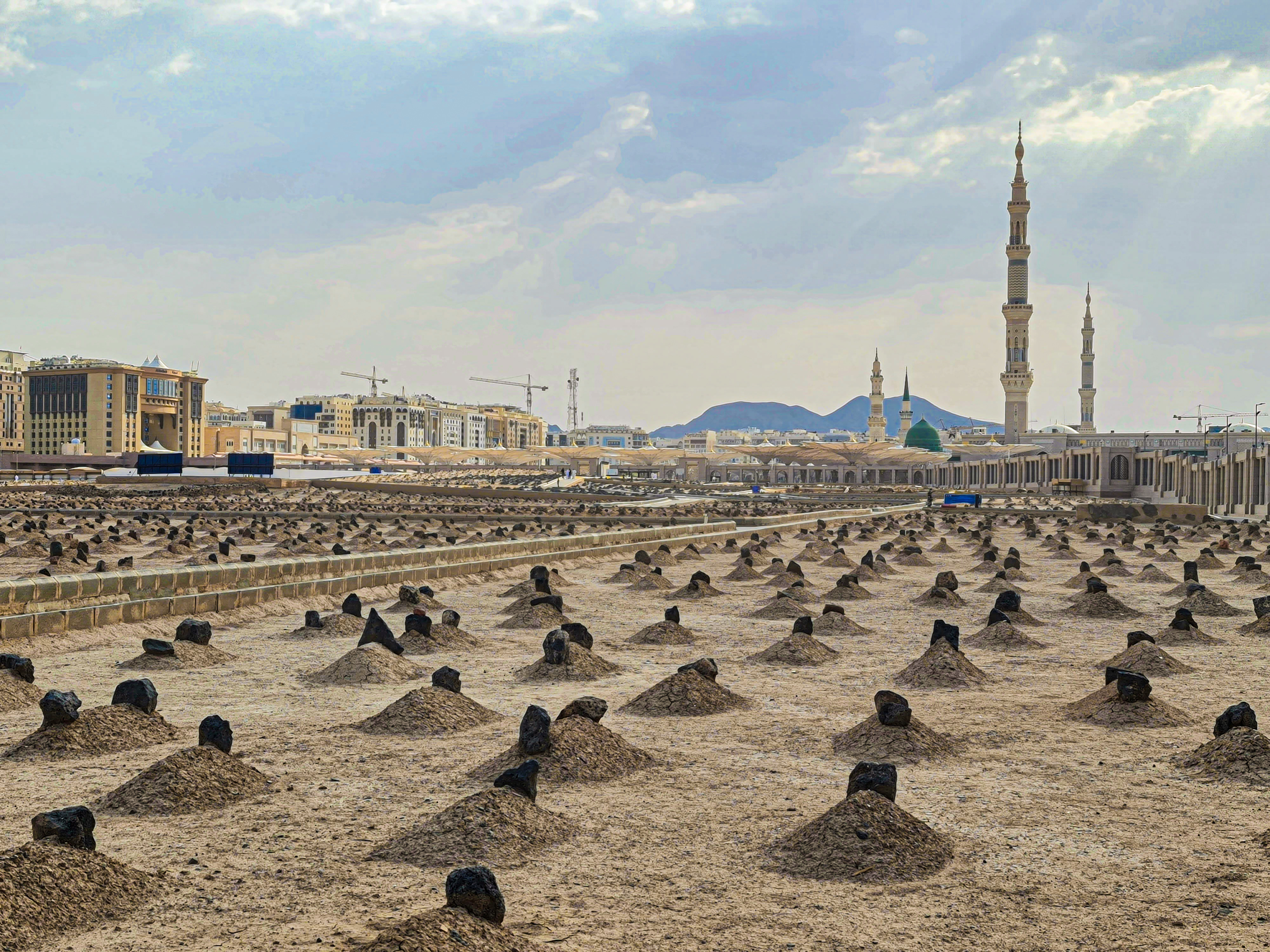
The cemetery today after the demolition of 1926.

When his youngest son Ibrahim died, Muhammad commanded that he be buried there as well. Following his instructions, two of his daughters Zainab and Umm Kulthum, were also buried near the grave of Uthman bin Maz'oon. Initially, the third caliph, Uthman, was buried in the large neighbouring Jewish graveyard. Over time, numerous domes and structures were built or reconstructed over various graves in al-Baqi. The cemetery was demolished under the Emirate of Diriyah in 1806. After their reconstruction, they were again demolished in 1926 under the Sultanate of Nejd, in accordance with their Wahhabi interpretation of Islamic law. These demolitions were condemned across the Islamic world, but the Saudi government has rejected calls for reconstruction.

=== Twelver ===
==== Imam Reza Shrine ====
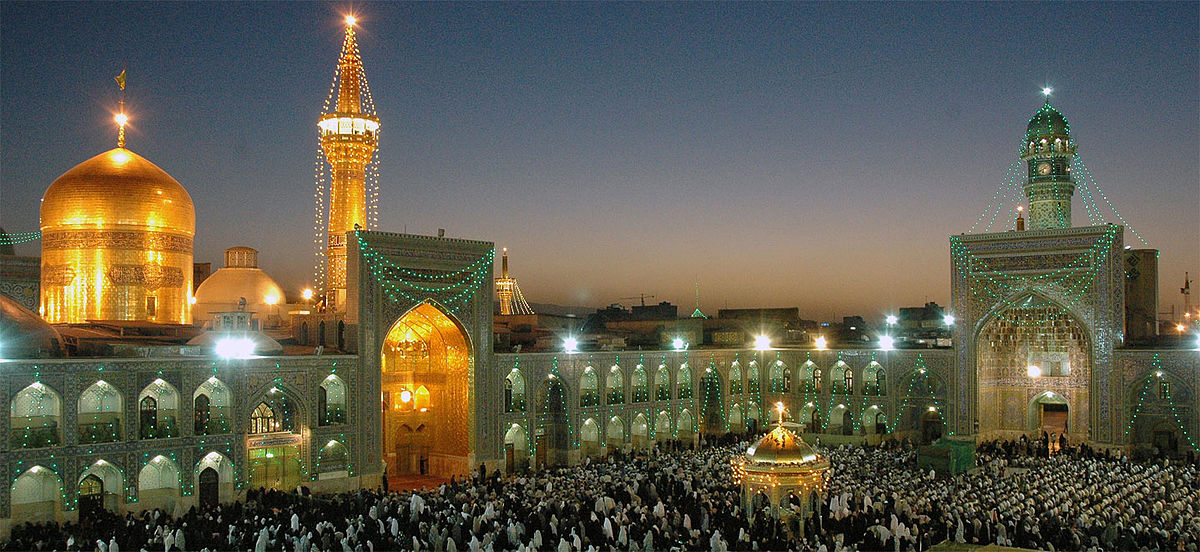
The Imam Reza Shrine in Mashhad, Iran, receives nearly 30 million pilgrims annually and is the most visited site in Islam. It contains the tomb of Reza, the eighth Shia Imam who is also part of the chain of mystical authority in Sunni Sufism. He was the only member of Muhammad's household to be formally appointed heir apparent of the Abbasid Caliphate, and the only Shia Imam to hold such a position. Known for his piety and learning, Reza's lineage traces through Ali via Muhammad's daughter Fatima, and their sons Hasan and Husayn. The vast complex is the world's largest mosque after Masjid al-Haram in Mecca and the Prophet's Mosque in Medina.

The Imam Reza Shrine is the mausoleum of Ali al-Rida, the eighth Shia Imam, located in Mashhad, the province of Razavi Khorasan, Iran. As one of the holiest sites in Shia Islam, nearly 30 million Muslims making pilgrimages to the shrine every year, the most visited site in Islam. Imam Reza was a descendant of Muhammad, known for his piety and learning. His lineage traces back to Ali via Muhammad's daughter Fatima, from their sons Hasan and Husayn. He is also part of the chain of mystical authority and asceticism in Sunni Sufism, making him widely respected in Sunni Islam as well. The Uyoun Akhbar Al-Ridha recorded miracles which have occurred at the shrine.

The shrine covers an area of 1,200,000 square meters, making it the world's third largest mosque, after Masjid al-Haram in Mecca and the Prophet's Mosque in Medina. The complex is also on the tentative list of UNESCO World Heritage Sites. Also buried within the shrine are the members of the Timurid, Safavid and Qajar family members, alongside the Abbasid caliph Harun al-Rashid, polymath Baha al-Din al-Amili, crown prince Abbas Mirza, and many other notable political figures, scholars, and clerics.

In the early 9th century, the Abbasid caliph Al-Ma'mun invited Reza from Medina to Merv in Khorasan and appointed him as his heir apparent, a move widely interpreted as an attempt to legitimize Abbasid rule and contain Shia influence. He was the only member of Muhammad's household to be formally appointed heir apparent of the Abbasid Caliphate, and the only Shia Imam to hold such a position. Imam Reza died in 818 CE in the city of Tus, allegedly poisoned by al-Ma'mun.

The site of his grave became a major destination for pilgrimage, and the surrounding settlement gradually developed around his tomb, creating a new city called Mashhad, meaning “place of martyrdom.” The earliest structures around the shrine date back to the 9th century, with significant patronage and expansion carried out during various periods, including by the Samanid, Seljuk, Ilkhanid, Timurid, Afsharid, Safavid, and Qajar Empires, and it is still expanding today.

The shrine is renowned for its vast scale, architectural grandeur, artistic richness, and spiritual atmosphere. The architecture of the shrine represents a blend of Persian and Islamic traditions. The complex features a prominent golden dome, multiple minarets, and numerous courtyards (sahn), prayer halls (riwaq). The central sanctuary houses the Imam's grave beneath the gilded dome. The interior of the shrine is richly decorated with mirror work, tile mosaics, stucco carvings, and intricate calligraphy featuring Quranic verses and religious inscriptions.

The shrine is an unmistakable landmark in Iran and Shia history, with the city of Mashhad regarded as the country's spiritual capital. The Goharshad Mosque, built by Timurid Empress Goharshad in 1418 CE, is also located at the shrine. The Astan Quds Razavi Central Museum, a library, four seminaries, a cemetery, and the Razavi University of Islamic Sciences, are contained within the complex as well. The shrine also serves as a major center for religious ceremonies, gatherings, and educational activities, attracting scholars and students from across the Islamic world. Several hadiths from the Shia Imams and from Muhammad highlight the importance of pilgrimage to the shrine.

Muhammad: "One of my own flesh and blood will be buried in the land of Khorasan. God the Highest will surely remove the sorrows of any sorrowful person who goes on pilgrimage to his shrine. God will surely forgive the sins of any sinful person who goes on pilgrimage to his shrine."

==== Kazimiyya Mosque ====
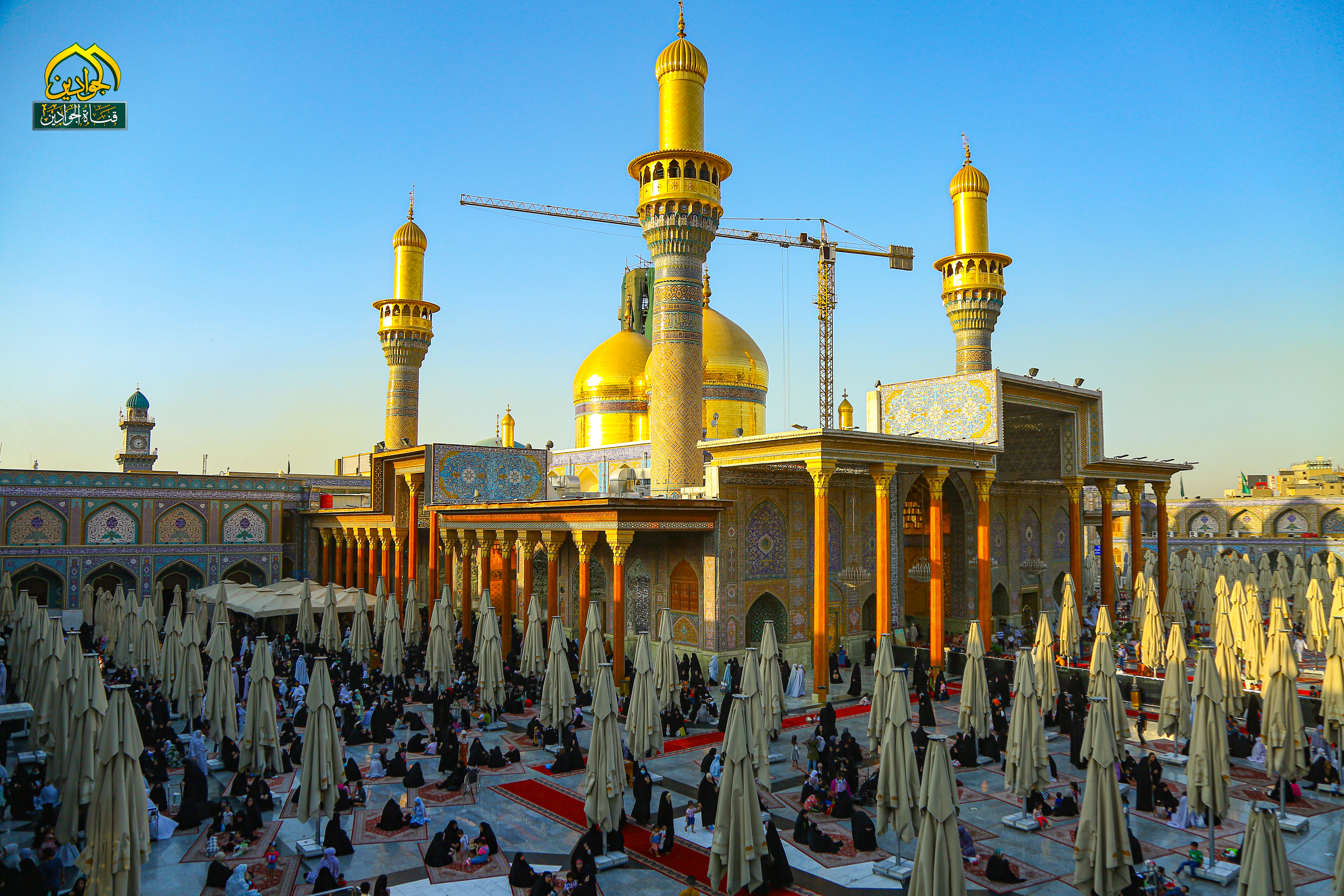
The Kazimiyya Mosque in Baghdad, Iraq, contains the tombs of the seventh and ninth Shia Imams, respectively Musa al-Kazim and his grandson Muhammad al-Jawad.

The Al-Kazimiyya Mosque, located in the Kādhimiya suburb of Baghdad, Iraq, contains the tombs of the seventh and ninth Shia Imams, Musa al-Kazim and his grandson Muhammad al-Jawad. Also buried within the premises are scholars Shaykh Mufīd and Shaykh Naṣīr ad-Dīn aṭ-Ṭūsi. Directly adjacent to the mosque are two smaller shrines, belonging to the brothers Sayyid Raḍī (who compiled Nahjul-Balāghah) and Sayyid Murtadā and Qadi Abu Yusuf al-Ansari.

The mosque was built on the site of a Quraysh cemetery, which was created with the original Round City of Baghdad in 762 CE. The cemetery was founded by Abbasid Caliph al-Mansur so that members of his family and internment can be buried in it. It is generally believed that Zubaidah bint Ja'far and al-Mansur himself were also buried in this location. The current building dates to the restoration carried out by the Safavid Iranian king Ismail I from 1502 to 1524. It was further ornamented by the Ottoman Sultan Suleiman the Magnificent after he conquered Baghdad in 1534.

Similar to many other Islamic settlements throughout history, settlements throughout time started to develop around the mosque which came to be known as the Kadhimiyya area. In 1611, the Ottoman Sultan Ahmed I granted Jamal al-Din bin Mullah Ali, a descendant from Bani Shaiba, a firman (royal decree), allowing him and his family to have full custodianship of the mosque and its shrine. Ancestors of Jamal became known as the al-Jamali family who were entrusted with the mosque and kept the firman. Among the most notable members of the al-Jamali family was Sheikh Abbas al-Jamali, who lived next to the mosque with visitors meeting him and was the father of Iraqi Statesman Muhammad Fadhel al-Jamali, who would become one of the founders of the United Nations.

==== Al-Askari Shrine ====
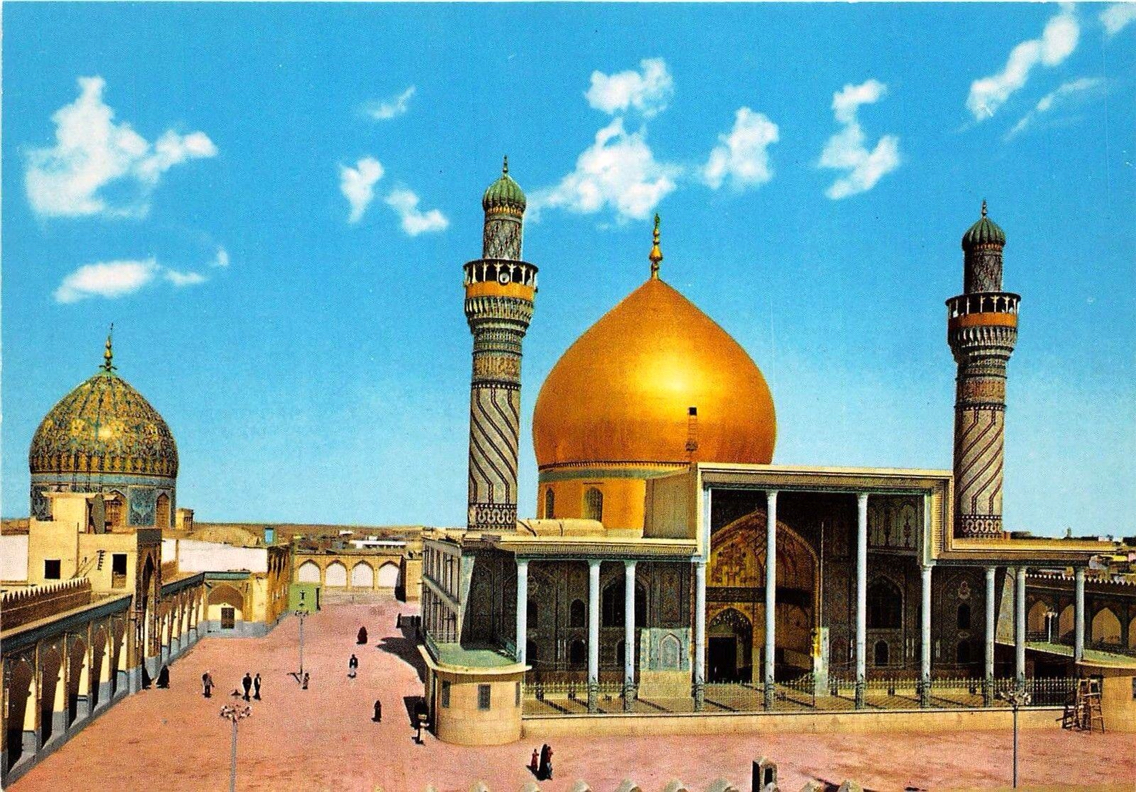
The Al-Askari Shrine in Samarra, Iraq, containts the tombs of the tenth and eleventh Shia Imams, al-Hadi and his son al-Askari.

Al-Askari Shrine in Samarra, Iraq, containts the tomb of the tenth and eleventh Shia Imams, al-Hādī and his son al-'Askarī. Housed in the mosque are also the tombs of Ḥakīma Khātūn, sister of al-Hādī; and Narjis Khātūn, the mother of al-Mahdī. Adjacent to the mosque is another domed commemorative building, the Serdab ("cistern"), built over the cistern where the Twelfth Imam, al-Mahdī, first entered the Minor Occultation or "hidden from the view"—whence the other title of the Mahdi, the Hidden Imam.

The Imams al-Hādī and al-'Askarī lived under house arrest in the part of Samarra that had been Caliph al-Mu'tasim's military camp ('Askar al-Mu‘tasim), hence an inmate of the camp was called an ('Askarī). As a result, they are known as the 'Askariyyayn. They died and were buried in their house. Tradition attributes their deaths to poison. The Iranian king Nasir al-Din Shah Qajar added the shrine's golden dome in 1868.

==== Fatima Masumeh Shrine ====
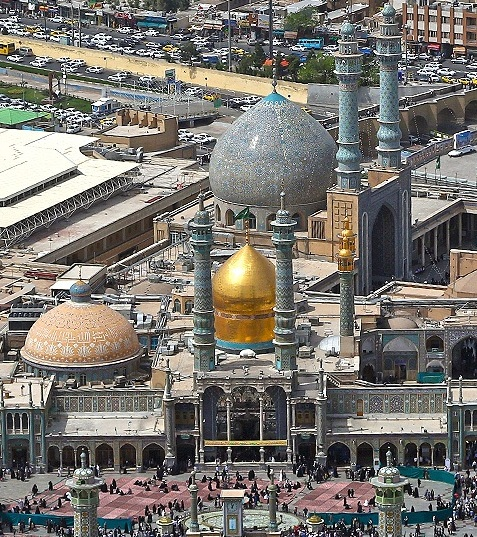
Qom in Iran is home to the Fatima Masumeh Shrine and is considered one of the holiest cities in Shia Islam, along with Najaf, Karbala, Mashhad, Samarra, Kadhimiya and Kufa. Fatima Masumeh, regarded as a saint, was the daughter of Musa al-Kazim and sister of Reza, the seventh and eighth Shia imams.

The Fatima Masumeh Shrine in Qom, Iran, is considered to be the most sacred city in Shia Islam along with Najaf, Karbala, Mashhad, Samarra, Kadhimiya and Kufa. Fatima Masumeh was the daughter of the seventh Shia Imam, Musa al-Kazim, and the sister of the eighth Shia Imam, Reza. In Shia Islam, women are often revered as saints if they are close relatives to one of the Imams. Fatima Masumeh is therefore honored as a saint, and her shrine in Qom is one of the most significant Shia shrines, a major destination for pilgrimage.

Every year, millions travel to Qom to honor Fatima Masumeh and seek her intercession with God. Also buried within the shrine are three daughters of the ninth Shia Imam al-Jawad, Persian poet Parvin Etesami, six members of the Safavid family, eleven members of the Qajar family, and many other notable political figures, scholars, and clerics. The shrine has attracted dozens of seminaries and religious schools.

In 816, when her brother Imam Reza was summoned to Khorasan, Fatima set out to join his brother in Merv but fell ill along the way in the Sunni town of Saveh. There she asked to be taken to the nearby Shia town of Qom, where she died a few days later, possibly after seventeen days. A local Shia figure by the name of Musa ibn Khazraj al-Ash'ari brought Fatima to Qom and hosted her during her final days.

==== Shah Gheragh ====
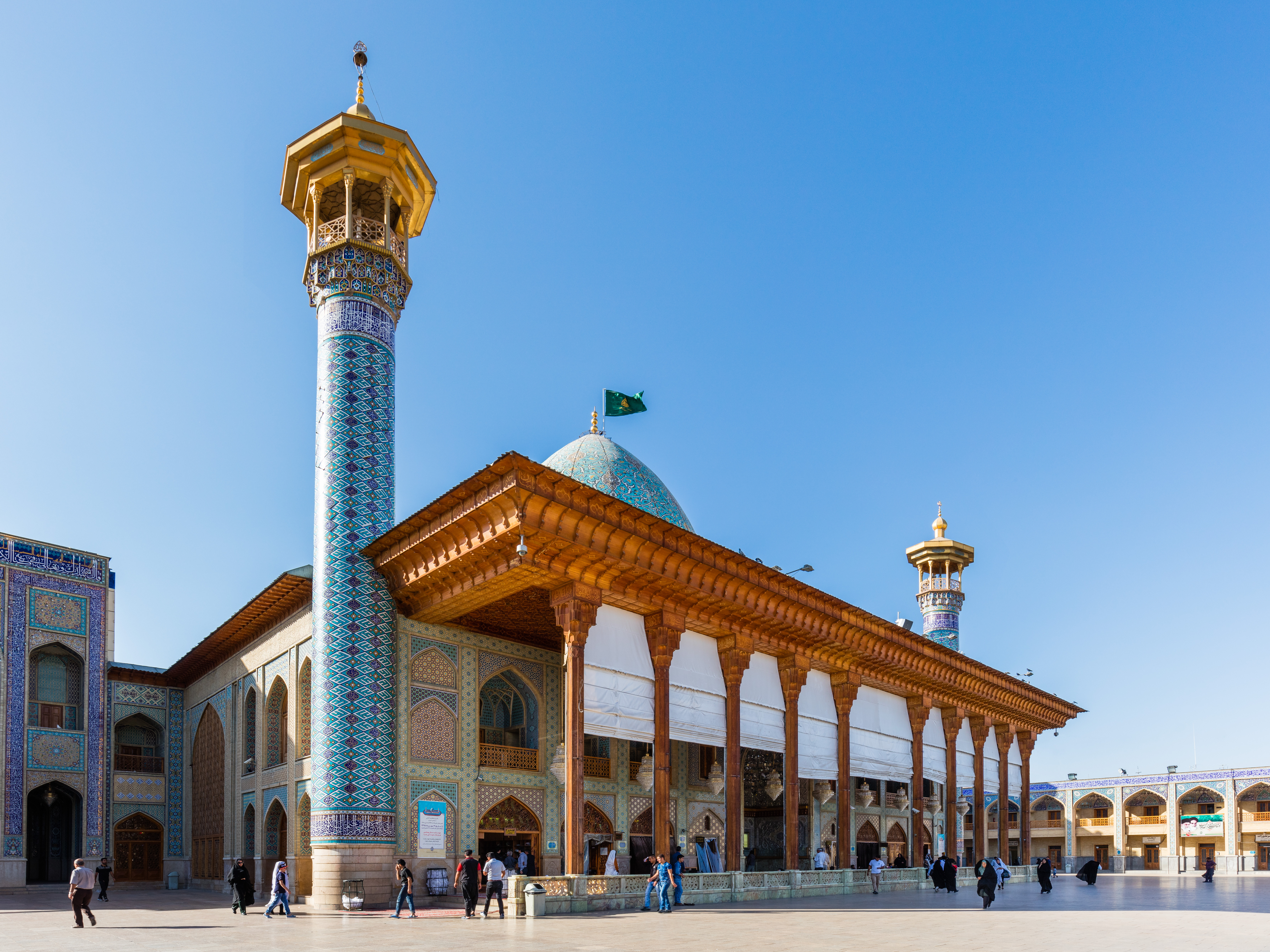
The Shah Cheragh in Shiraz, Iran, houses the mausoleums of the two sons of the seventh Shia Imam Musa al-Kazim, brothers of the eighth Imam Reza.

The Shah Cheragh in Shiraz, Fars province, Iran, is the mausoleum of Ahmad ibn Musa, a son of the seventh Shia Imam Musa al-Kazim and a brother of the eighth Shia Imam Reza, who is known as Shah Cheragh (King of Light) in local traditions, and hence the building's name.

The complex is one of the holiest sites in Shia Islam. Following the Abbasid persecution of the Shi'ite sect, Sayyid Ahmad ibn Musa (also known as Syed Amir Ahmad) and his brother, Muhammad ibn Musa al-Kazim, both of whom were brothers of Reza, took refuge in Shiraz.

The first structure over his grave, a simple domed mausoleum, was built in the 13th century during the rule of the Salghurids, by the minister, a former Buyid prince, attributed to Atabak Sa'ad Ebn-e-Zangi. Local folklore tells that the grave was found when a light appeared over it, which caught the attention of the people, who told the minister about what they had seen. The tombs of both brothers became celebrated pilgrimage destinations since the 14th century.

==== Jamkaran Mosque ====
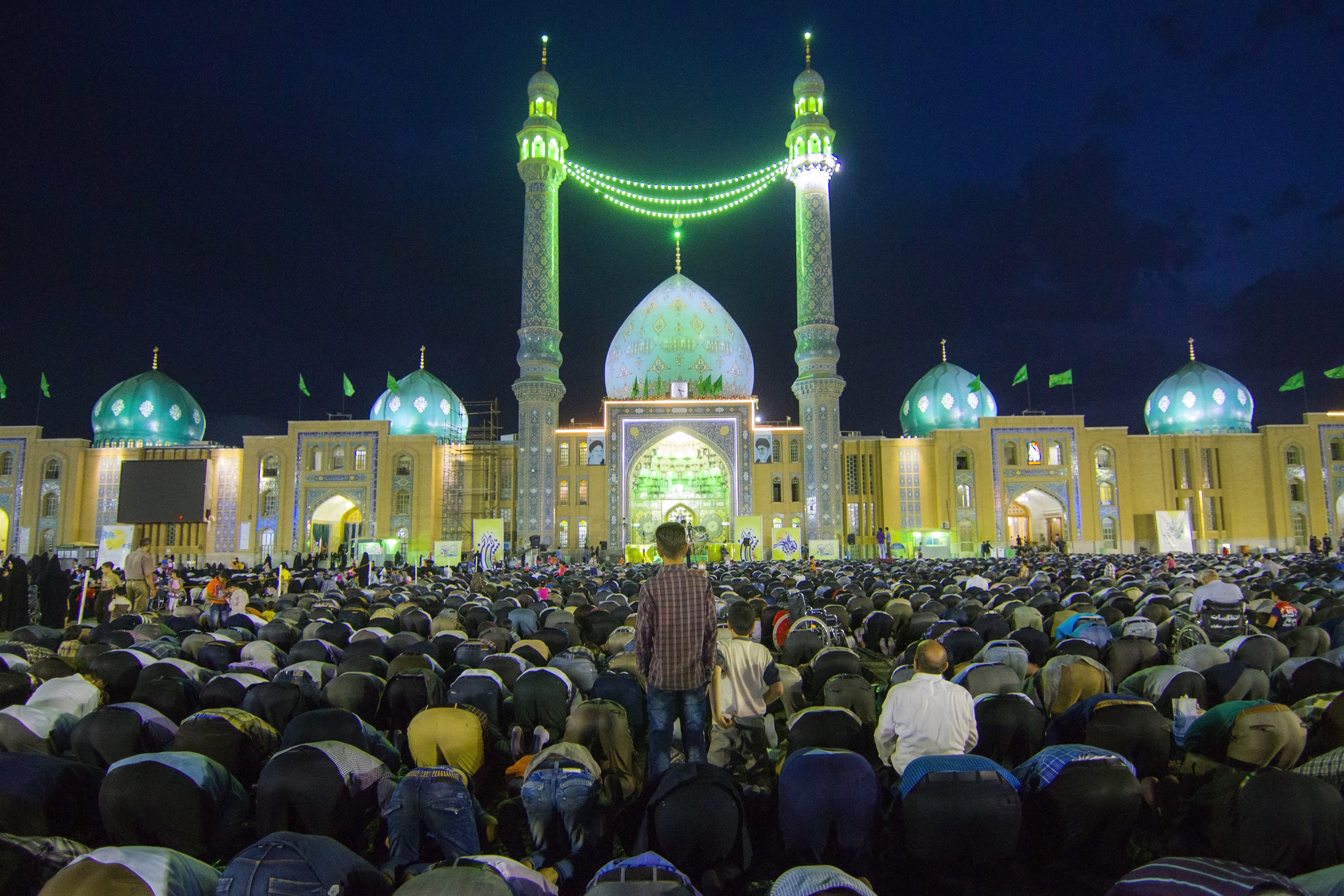
The Jamkaran Mosque in Qom, Iran, is where Twelver belief holds that the twelfth Shia Imam—the promised Mahdi—once appeared and offered prayers.

The Jamkaran Mosque in the village of Jamkaran, on the outskirts of Qom, Iran, is where Twelver belief holds that the 12th Shia Imam—the promised Mahdi according to Twelvers—once appeared and offered prayers. Many Shia Muslims go to this mosque on Wednesday nights and the night of the middle of Sha'ban - the birthday of Mahdi - and perform its rituals. The mosque has a history of over a thousand years, and receives more than 15 million pilgrims annually.

It was further developed after the residents of Ghadiriyah from the Bani Asad tribe fled to Qom, during the Mukhtar uprising in Kufa (685 CE). The mosque has been a sacred place at least since around 983 CE, when Sheikh Hassan ibn Muthlih Jamkarani reportedly met the Twelfth Imam along with the prophet Al-Khidr. Jamkarani was instructed that the land they were on was "noble" and that the owner, Hasan bin Muslim, was to cease cultivating it and finance the building of a mosque on it from the earnings he had accumulated from farming the land.

Sometime in the decade of 1995–2005, the mosque's reputation spread, and many pilgrims, particularly young people, began to come to it. In the rear of the mosque, there is a "well of requests" where it is believed the Twelfth Imam once "became miraculously unhidden for a brief shining moment of loving communion with his creator." Pilgrims tie small strings in a knot around the grids covering the holy well, which they hope will be received by Imam Mahdi. Every morning custodians cut off the strings from the previous day.

==== Other Twelver shrines ====
- Imamzadeh Hilal ibn Ali in Aran and Bidgol, Iran, holds the tomb of Muhammad al-Awsat ibn Ali, a son of Ali and a great-grandson of Muhammad.
- Mada'in in Iraq holds the tomb of Muhammad's Iranian companion, Salman the Persian.
- Balad, Iraq, is home to the Sayyid Muhammad Shrine, dedicated to al-Hadi, the son of the tenth Imam Ali al-Hadi.
- Bibi Shahrbanu Shrine in Rey, southern Tehran, is the tomb of Shahrbanu, who was the wife of Husayn and the mother of al-Sajjad.
- Imamzadeh Hamzeh in Kashmar, Iran, contains the tomb of Sayyid Ḥamzah, a son of the seventh Imam Musa al-Kazim.
- Imamzadeh Hossein in Kordan, Iran, contains the tomb of a descendant of the fourth Imam, Ali al-Sajjad.
- Imamzadeh Shahreza in Isfahan, Iran, contains the tomb of a son of the seventh Imam Musa al-Kazim, and a brother of the eighth Imam Reza.
- Imamzadeh Seyed Mohammad in Tabriz, Iran, Seyed Mohammad, a son of Zayd ibn Ali.
- Imamzadeh Ja'far in Isfahan, Iran, contains the tomb of Ja'far ibn Abi Talib, a companion of Muhammad.
- Imamzadeh Hossein in Qazvin, Iran, contains the tomb of Hossein, a son of the eighth Imam Ali al-Rida.
- Imamzadeh Sayyid Muhammad Kojajani in Tabriz, Iran, contains the tomb of Shams al-Din Sayyid Muhammad ben Sadiq ben Muhammad, a descendant of the fourth Imam, al-Sajjad.
- Imamzadeh Davood in Tehran, Iran, contains the tomb of a descendant of the second Imam, Hasan.
- Emamzadeh Hashem Shrine in Haraz, Iran, contains the tomb of a descendant of Hasan, the second Imam.
- Tomb of Seyed Alaeddin Husayn in Shiraz, Iran, contains the tomb of Ala'ed-Din Husayn, a son of the seventh Imam Musa al-Kazim.
- Imamzadeh Ismail and Shayah Mosque in Isfahan, Iran, contains the tomb of a descendant of the second Imam, Hasan.
- Imamzadeh Complex in the Republic of Azerbaijan, comprises a mausoleum that houses the grave of a prominent figure in Shia Islam.
- Imamzadeh Haroun-e-Velayat in Isfahan, Iran, contains the tomb of a descendant of Musa al-Kazim, the seventh Imam.
- Imamzadeh Ja'far in Borujerd, Iran, contains the remains of Abulqāsim Ja’far ibn al-Husayn, grandson of the fourth Imam Zayn al-Abidin.
- Imamzadeh Hoseyn ibn Musa al-Kazim in Tabas, Iran, contains the tomb of a son of the seventh Imam Musa al-Kazim, and a brother of the eighth Imam Reza

=== Ismailism, Zaydism, and Alawites ===
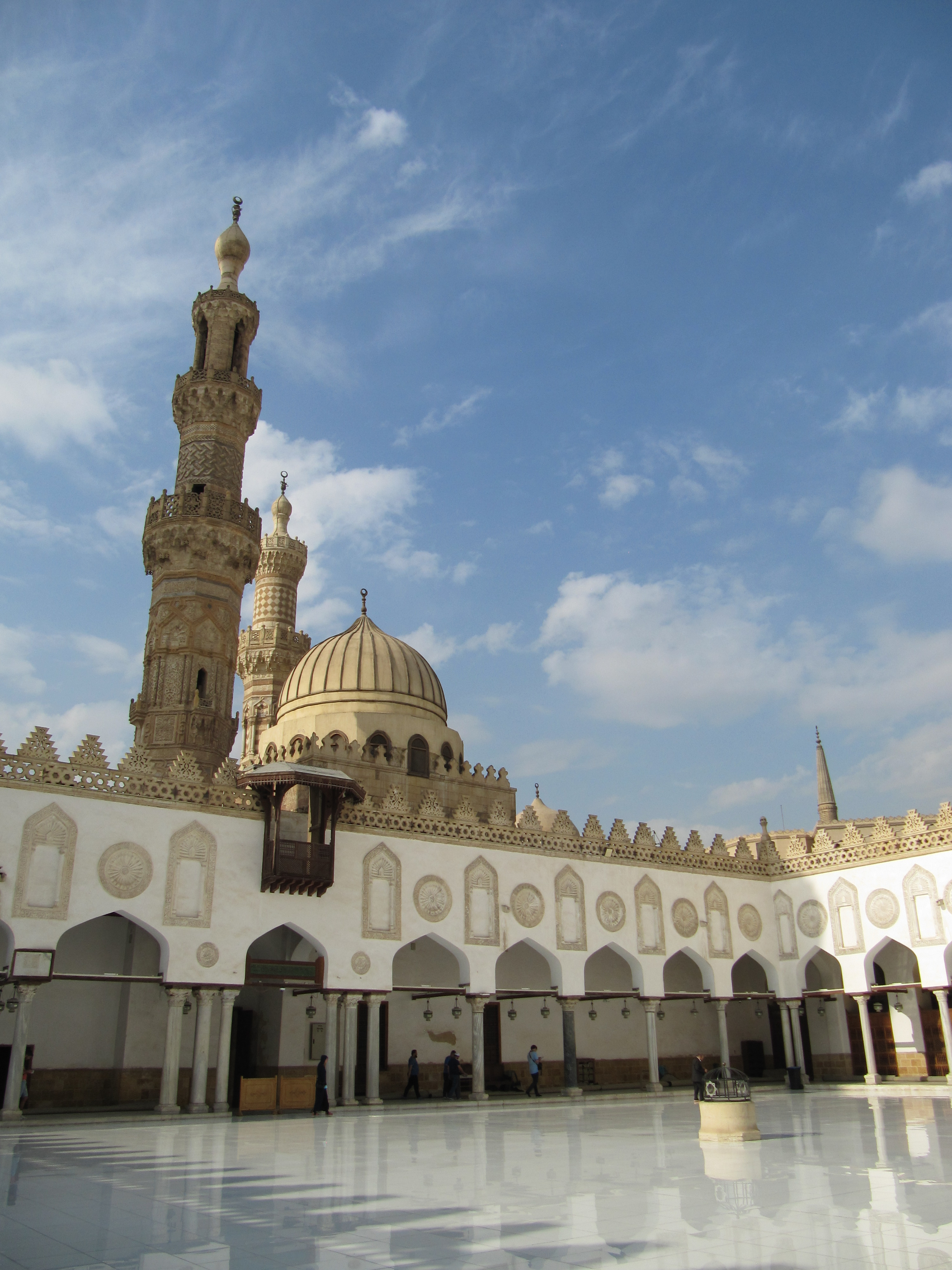
The Al-Azhar Mosque in Cairo, Egypt, was established around 970 CE as an Ismaili institution.

Historically, the most important place in Ismailism was Cairo during the Fatimid period. When the Fatimids established their caliphate in the 10th century, they ruled as Ismaili leaders. Al-Azhar Mosque and University was founded specifically to teach Ismaili theology, philosophy, and law, and it functioned as the intellectual heart of the Ismailism. Al-Azhar remains the single most powerful symbol of Ismaili achievement, representing the only time Ismailism governed a major Islamic empire.

After its dedication in 972, and with the hiring by mosque authorities of 35 scholars in 989, the mosque slowly developed into what it is today. Over the course of its over a millennium-long history, the mosque has been alternately neglected and highly regarded. Because it was founded as a Shiite Ismaili institution, Saladin and the Sunni Ayyubid dynasty that he founded shunned al-Azhar, removing its status as a congregational mosque and denying stipends to students and teachers at its school.

These moves were reversed under the Mamluk Sultanate, under whose rule numerous expansions and renovations took place. Later rulers of Egypt showed differing degrees of deference to the mosque and provided widely varying levels of financial assistance, both to the school and to the upkeep of the mosque. Today, al-Azhar remains a deeply influential institution in Egyptian society that is highly revered and a symbol of Islamic Egypt.

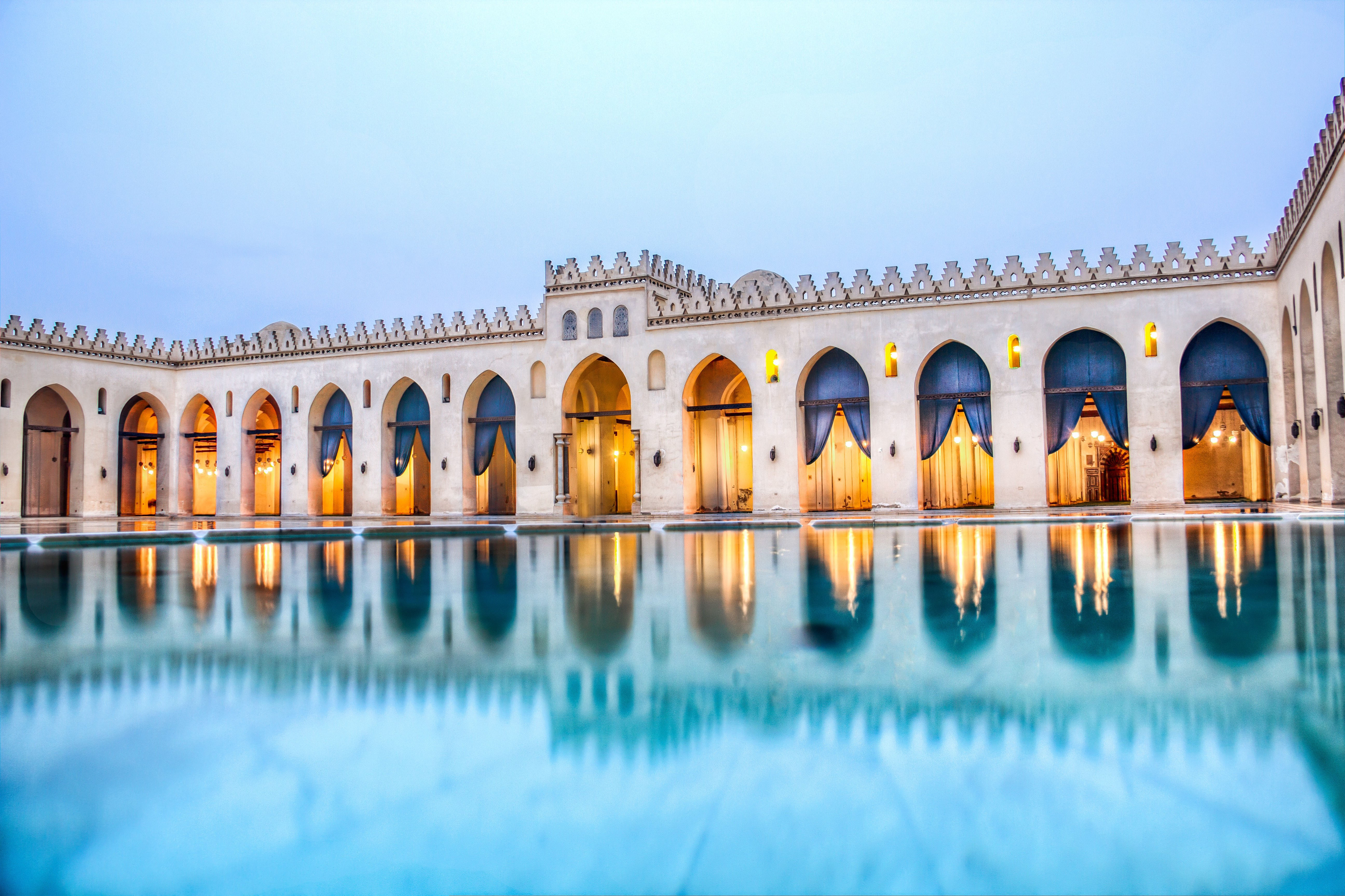
The Al-Hakim Mosque in Cairo, Egypt, was built around 990 CE by Ḥākim bi-Amr Allāh, the sixteenth Ismaili leader.

Al-Hakim Mosque is important to Ismailism because it comes from the period when Ismaili leaders ruled openly as caliphs. It was built under the Fatimid Imamate in Cairo and functioned as a major state mosque and teaching center for Ismaili doctrine. It represents a time when Ismailism was not a minority tradition but the ideological core of a powerful empire. Teaching there was tied directly to the Fatimid daʿwa.

Architecturally, the mosque consists of a hypostyle prayer hall and a wide internal courtyard (sahn), accessed via a projecting entrance portal. Its most notable features are its two unusual minarets: the original minarets of the mosque have ornate multi-tiered designs but, for reasons that remain unclear, these were encased shortly afterwards inside the massive square bastions still seen today.

Alawites are an ethnoreligious group, an offshoot of Shia Islam as a ghulat branch during the ninth century. Alawites venerate Ali, the first Imam, as a manifestation of the divine essence. It is the only ghulat sect still in existence today. The group was founded during the ninth century by Ibn Nusayr, who was a disciple of the tenth Imam, al-Hadi, and of the eleventh Imam, al-Askari.

The Quran is one of their holy books, but its interpretation differs significantly from the mainstream Shia Muslims and aligns with early Batiniyya. Alawite theology and rituals differ sharply from Shia Islam in several important ways. For instance, various Alawite rituals involve the drinking of wine and the sect does not prohibit the consumption of alcohol for its adherents. As a creed that teaches the symbolic/esoteric reading of Qur'anic verses, Alawite theology is based on the belief in reincarnation and views Ali as a divine incarnation of God. Moreover, Alawite clergy and scholarships insist that their religion is theologically distinct from Shia Islam.

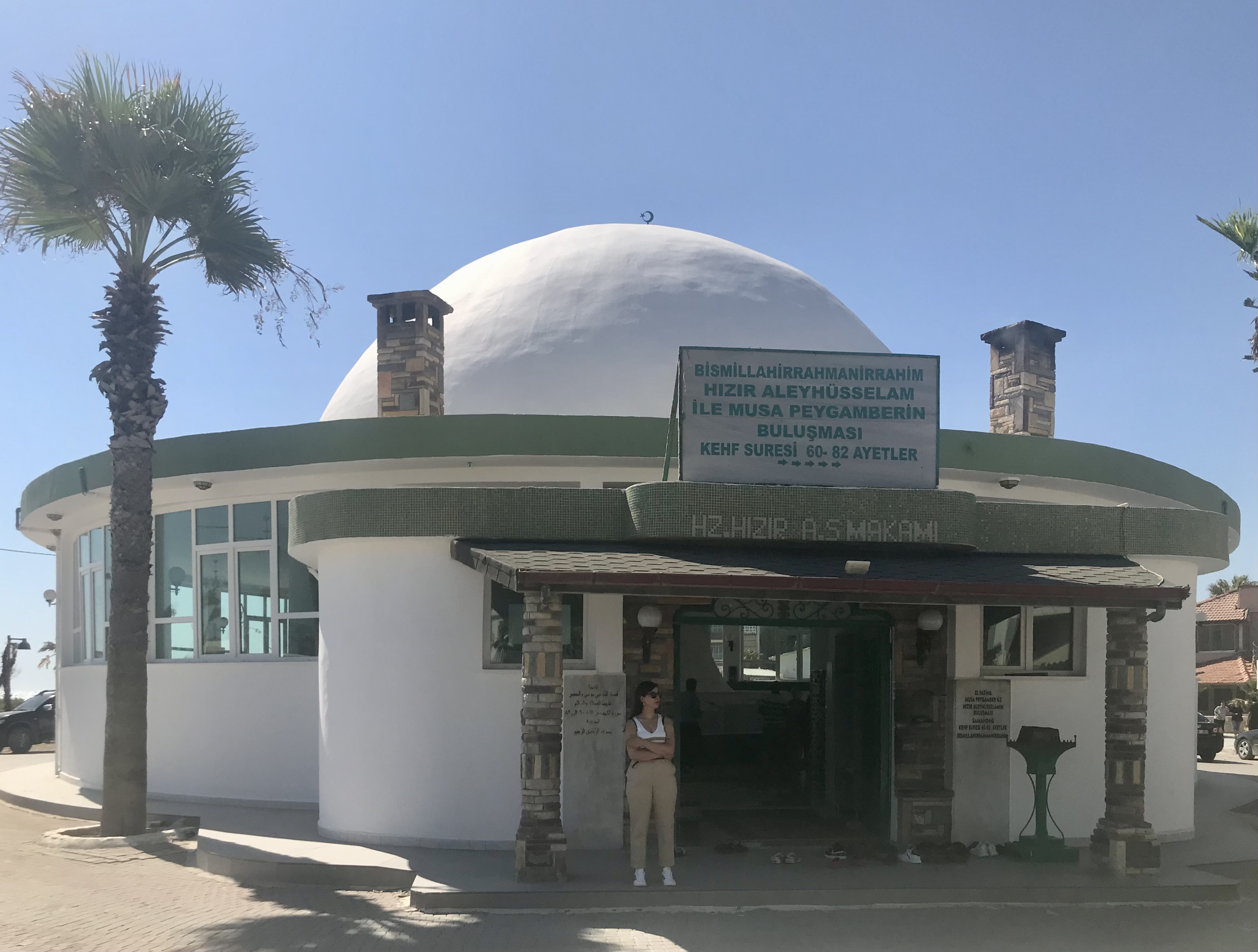
The Shrine of Khidr, located near the Syria-Turkey border, is considered sacred by the Alawites.

Alawites have historically kept their beliefs secret from outsiders and non-initiated Alawites, so rumours about them have arisen. At the core of the Alawite creed is the belief in a divine Trinity, comprising three aspects of the one God. The aspects of the Trinity are Mana (meaning), Ism (Name) and Bab (Door). Alawite beliefs hold that these emanations underwent re-incarnation cyclically seven times in human form throughout history. According to Alawites, the seventh incarnation of the trinity consists of Ali, Muhammad himself, and Salman the Persian. An important component of Alawism is the belief in the transfer of souls, rejected by both the Shia and Sunni, leading to the Alawites being considered heretics by theologians of Sunni and Shia Islam.

Khidr holds special spiritual and mystical significance. Unlike mainstream Sunni and Shia Islam, Alawite theology incorporates esoteric interpretations of Qur’anic figures, and Khidr is viewed as a hidden, eternal guide, a spiritual intermediary, and a source of divine wisdom.

Zayd ibn ʿAlī was the son of Ali ibn al-Husayn Zayn al-Abidin, and great-grandson of Ali. He led an unsuccessful revolt against the Umayyad Caliphate, in which he died. The event gave rise to the Zaydiyya sect of Shia Islam, which holds him as the next Imam after his father Ali ibn al-Husayn Zayn al-Abidin. Zayd ibn Ali is also seen as a major religious figure by many Sunnis and was supported by the prominent Sunni jurist, Abu Hanifa, who issued a fatwa in support of Zayd against the Umayyads.

To Twelver and Isma'ili Shias, however, his elder half-brother Muhammad al-Baqir is seen as the next Imam. Nevertheless, he is considered an important revolutionary figure by Shias and a martyr (shaheed) by all schools of Islam, including Sunnis and Shias. The call for revenge for his death, and for the brutal display of his body, contributed to the Abbasid Revolution.

== Ibadism ==
Ibadism is the third branch of Islam whose roots go back to the Kharijite secession from Ali. Ibadi Muslims are known as the Ibadis or, as they call themselves, 'The People of Truth and Integrity'.

In Ibadi Islam, there is no formal doctrine of sacred shrines or saint-centered holy sites. Like all Muslims, they recognize Mecca, Medina and Al-Aqsa Mosque as holy. Beyond the three universally sacred sites, Ibadism does not promote pilgrimage to shrines or mosques.

As a result, mosques in Ibadi communities—such as those in Oman, Libya, Tanzania, Tunisia, Dominican Republic, and Algeria—are valued primarily as centers of communal worship. Ibadis are far less numerous than the two largest Muslim denominations: Sunnis and Shias. Ibadi Islam remain understudied by outsiders, including both non-Muslims and Sunni/Shia Muslims.

== Alevism ==
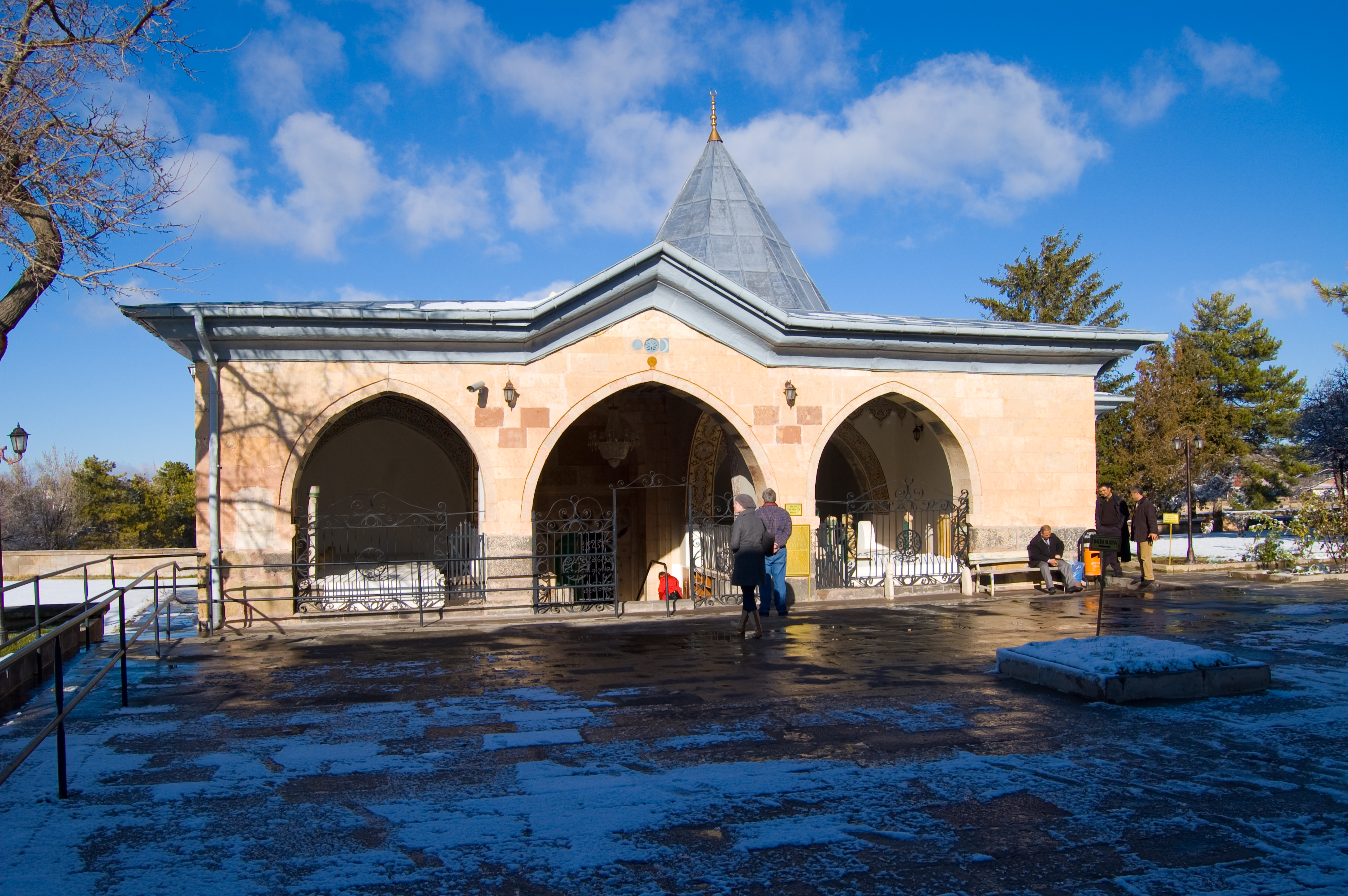
The Haji Bektash Veli Complex in Hacıbektaş, Turkey, contains the tomb of Haji Bektash Veli, the most revered spiritual figure in Alevism. He is considered the central saint and spiritual guide of the Alevi tradition.

Alevism is a syncretic and mystic tradition, whose adherents follow the mystical (bāṭenī) teachings of Ali and Haji Bektash Veli. It is generally agreed that Alavism is akin to a Sufi rendition of Twelver Shia Islam that integrates Central Asian shamanic elements, though some dissenting voices base the Alevi belief squarely in a non-denominational, heterodox Anatolian Islam instead. They acknowledge the six articles of faith of Islam, but may differ regarding their interpretation. Lack of gender segregation in ritual contexts and clergy is one of the key features that sets Alevism apart from Muslim orthodoxy.

Performing ziyarat and du'a at the tombs of Alevi-Bektashi saints or pirs is quite common. Some Alevis make pilgrimages to mountains and other natural sites believed to be imbued with holiness. Alevis generally recognize Mecca, Medina, and Jerusalem as important places in Islamic history. However, Alevism does not emphasize pilgrimage or shrine-centered ritual life in the same way Sunni and Shia Muslims do. The spiritual center of Alevi practice is the cem ceremony held in a cemevi, not the mosque, and their devotional focus is deeply centered on the Twelve Imams.

== Quranism ==
Quranism, or Quran-only Islam, is a movement that accepts the Quran as the sole source of religious authority and rejects Hadith literature as binding. Because of this emphasis on scripture rather than tradition, Quranism does not have shrines, tombs, or pilgrimage sites comparable to those in Sunni and Shia Islam. The Quranists do recognize Mecca, Medina, and Jerusalem as sacred due to their Quranic significance. Quranism is an Islamic denomination that considers the Quran to be the only dependable religious text. Quranist Muslims believe that the Qur'an is clear and complete and can be fully understood without recourse to external sources. The extent to which Quranists reject the authenticity of the Sunnah varies, though the most established groups of Quranism have thoroughly criticised and rejected the Hadith, the most prevalent being the Quranist claim that the Hadith is not mentioned in the Qur'an as a source of Islamic theology or practise, was not recorded in written form until two centuries after the death of Muhammad, and contains perceived errors and contradictions. Quranists also believe that previous revelations of God have been altered, and that the Qur'an is the only book of God that has valid divine significance.

As they believe that Hadith, while not being reliable sources of religion, can serve as historical records, Quranists cite some early Islamic writings in support of their positions, including those attributed to Muhammad, caliph Umar (r. 634–644) and materials dating to the Umayyad and Abbasid caliphates. Modern scholarship holds that controversy over the sufficiency of the Qur'an as the only source of Islamic law and doctrine dates back to the early centuries of Islam, where some scholars introduced followers of the Qur'an alone as Mu'tazilites or sects of the Kharijites, such as the Haruri and the Azariqa. Though the Qur'an-only view waned during the classical Islamic period, it re-emerged and thrived with the modernist thinkers of the 19th century in Egypt and the Indian subcontinent. Some scholars hold that Quranism in the early 20th century was influenced by the Salafi movement. Quranism has since taken on political, reformist, fundamentalist, and militant dimensions in various countries. Currently, it is reported that the Quranists encompasses tens of thousands to potentially a million followers globally.

In matters of faith, jurisprudence, and legislation, Quranists differ from Ahl al-Hadith, who consider the Hadith (Kutub al-Sittah) in addition to the Quran. Unlike Sunnis and Shias, Quranists argue that Islam can be practised without the Hadith. Whereas Hadith-followers believe that obedience to Muhammad entails obedience to Hadiths, Quranists believe that obedience to Muhammad means obedience to the Qur'an. In addition, several extra-Quranic traditions, such as kissing the Black Stone, the symbolic Stoning of the Devil, and the Tashahhud during the Ṣalāh, are regarded as idolatry (shirk) or possible idolatry by Quranists. This methodological difference has led to considerable divergence between Quranists and both Sunnis and Shias in matters of theology and law as well as the understanding of the Quran.

== Ahmadiyya ==
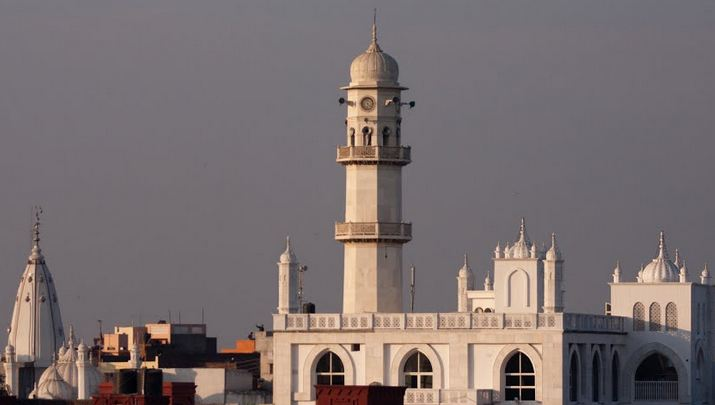
Qadian in India is the birthplace of Mirza Ghulam Ahmad, the founder of the Ahmadiyya movement within Islam.

Ahmadiyya is an Islamic messianic movement originating in British India in the late 19th century. It was founded by Mirza Ghulam Ahmad, who said he had been divinely appointed as both the promised Messiah and Mahdi expected by Muslims to appear towards the end times and bring about, by peaceful means, the final triumph of Islam; as well as to embody, in this capacity, the expected eschatological figure of other major religious traditions. Adherents of the Ahmadiyya—a term adopted expressly in reference to Muhammad's alternative name Ahmad — are known as Ahmadi Muslims or simply Ahmadis.

Ahmadi thought emphasises the belief that Islam is the final dispensation for humanity as revealed to Muhammad and the necessity of restoring it to its true intent and pristine form, which had been lost through the centuries. Its adherents consider Ahmad to have appeared as the Mahdi—bearing the qualities of Jesus in accordance with their reading of scriptural prophecies—to revitalise Islam and set in motion its moral system that would bring about lasting peace. They believe that upon divine guidance he purged Islam of foreign accretions in belief and practice by championing what is, in their view, Islam's original precepts as practised by Muhammad and the early Muslim community. Ahmadis thus view themselves as leading the propagation and renaissance of Islam.

Mirza Ghulam Ahmad established the Community on 23 March 1889 by formally accepting allegiance from his supporters. Since his death, the Community has been led by a succession of Caliphs. Ahmadiyya's recognition of Ahmad as a prophet has been characterised as heretical by mainstream Muslims (Sunnis and Shias), who believe that Muhammad was the final prophet, and the Ahmadi movement has faced non-recognition, takfir, and persecution in many parts of the world. Ahmadiyya Muslims fully recognize Mecca, Medina, and Jerusalem as holy sites, just like Sunni and Shia Muslims. The movement is almost entirely a single group.

== Non-denominational Muslims ==
A non-denominational Muslim is a Muslim who does not belong to, does not self-identify with, or cannot be readily classified under one of the identifiable Islamic branches. Such Muslims do not think of themselves as belonging to a denomination but rather as "just Muslims" or "non-denominational Muslims." Muslims who do not adhere to a branch are also known as non-sectarian Muslims. While the majority of Muslims identify as either Sunni or Shia, a significant number identify as non-denominational. Surveys have reported that large proportions of Muslims in some parts of the world self-identify as "just Muslim" or "Muslim only".

A non-denominational Muslim might develop deep personal attachments to certain places that carry spiritual meaning for them personally. They might feel closest to God in the shrine where they first prayed, in the room where they made sincere tawbah, or on a quiet hill where they reflected during a difficult time. However, they would usually distinguish between personal spiritual significance and divinely designated sacredness. They still recognize the three central sacred sites— Mecca, Medina, and Jerusalem — whose holiness is established by revelation and shared by the entire Muslim World.

== See also ==
- Custodian of the Two Holy Mosques
- Ḥ-R-M
  - Haram (site)
- Lists of mosques
  - List of largest mosques
  - List of mosques
- Middle East
- Near East

== Bibliography ==
- Aksan, Virginia H.; Goffman, Daniel (2007). The early modern Ottomans: remapping the Empire. Cambridge University Press. ISBN 978-0-521-81764-6.
- Peters, Francis (1994). The Hajj: The Muslim Pilgrimage to Mecca and the Holy Places. Princeton, New Jersey: Princeton University Press. ISBN 9780691026190.
- Musharraf, Hussain (2012). The Five Pillars of Islam: Laying the Foundations of Divine Love and Service to Humanity. Leicestershire, UK: Kube Publishing. ISBN 9781847740236.
- Blatt, Amy (2015). Health, Science, and Place: A New Model. Cham, Switzerland: Springer. doi:10.1007/978-3-319-12003-4. ISBN 978-3319120027. S2CID 183074116.
- Tucker, Spencer; Roberts, Priscilla (2008). The encyclopedia of the Arab-Israeli conflict : a political, social, and military history. Santa Barbara, California: ABC-CLIO. ISBN 978-1851098415.
- Honigmann, Ernst (1993) [1927]. "Hebron". In Houtsma, M. T. (ed.). E.J. Brill's first encyclopedia of Islam, 1913–1936. Vol. IV. BRILL. pp. 886–888. ISBN 978-90-04-09790-2.
