= Ahmed Yusuf =

Ahmed Yusuf may refer to:

- Ahmed Yusuf Mahamud, Somali sultan
- Ahmad Yusuf Nuristani, Afghan politician
- Ahmed Yusuf Yasin, Somali politician
- Ahmad Yusof, Malaysian footballer
- Ahmed Youssif, Egpytian coach
- Ahmed Yousef (scientist), food engineer
- Ahmed Yousef, Palestinian politician
- Ahmed Youssef, Egyptian footballer

== See also ==
- Yousef Ahmed (disambiguation)
