= Antisemitism in Islam =

There is considerable debate about the nature of antisemitism in Islam, including Muslim attitudes towards Jews, Islamic teachings on Jews and Judaism, and the treatment of Jews in Islamic societies throughout the history of Islam. Islamic literary sources have both described Jewish groups in negative terms and called for acceptance of them. Some of these descriptions overlap with Islamic remarks on non-Muslim religious groups in general.

With the rise of Islam in Arabia in the 7th century CE and its subsequent spread during the early Muslim conquests, Jews, (alongside Christians, Zoroastrians and Berbers) became subject to the rule of Islamic polities. Their quality of life under Muslim rule varied considerably in different periods, as did the attitudes of the rulers, government officials, the clergy, and the general population towards Jews, ranging from tolerance to persecution.

An antisemitic trope commonly found in some Islamic (and Christian) discourse is the accusation of Jews as the "killers of prophets", finding justification in some depictions of the Banu Israil (Islamic name for the Israelites) made in the Quran.

== Range of opinions ==
- Claude Cahen and Shelomo Dov Goitein argue against the claim that antisemitism has a long history in Muslim countries, writing that the discrimination that was practiced against non-Muslims (kuffar) was of a general nature, so it was not specifically directed against Jews. According to these scholars, antisemitism in medieval Islam was local and sporadic rather than general and endemic.
- Bernard Lewis writes that while Muslims have held stereotypes of Jews throughout most of Islamic history, these stereotypes were different from those stereotypes which accompanied European medieval antisemitism because, unlike Christians who considered Jews objects of fear, Muslims considered Jews objects of only ridicule. He argues that Muslims did not attribute "cosmic evil" to Jews. In Lewis's view, it was only in the late 19th century that movements first appeared among Muslims that can be described as antisemitic in the European forms.
- Frederick M. Schweitzer and Marvin Perry argue that there are mostly negative references to Jews in the Quran and Hadith, and that Islamic regimes treated Jews in degrading ways. They assert that both the Jews and the Christians were relegated to the status of dhimmi. Schweitzer and Perry state that throughout much of history, Christians treated Jews worse than Muslims did, stating that Jews in the lands of Christendom were subjected to worse polemics, persecutions, and massacres than Jews living under Muslim rule.
- According to Walter Laqueur, the varying interpretations of the Quran are important for understanding Muslim attitudes towards Jews. A number of Quranic verses preach tolerance towards the Jews; others make hostile remarks about them (which are similar to hostile remarks against all who do not accept Islam). Muhammad interacted with the Jewish tribes of Arabia: he preached to convert them, fought and killed some, but also befriended other Jews.
- For Martin Kramer, the idea that contemporary new antisemitism by Muslims is authentically Islamic "touches on some truths, yet it misses many others" (see antisemitism in the Arab world). Kramer believes that contemporary antisemitism is only partially due to the policies of the State of Israel, which Muslims consider an injustice and a major cause of their sense of victimhood and loss. Kramer attributes the primary causes of Muslim antisemitism to modern European antisemitic ideologies, which have infected the Muslim world.
- Amal Saad-Ghorayeb, a Lebanese writer and political analyst, devoted a chapter of her book Hizbu'llah: Politics and Religion to an analysis of Hezbollah's anti-Jewish racial antisemitism and anti-Judaism. She argues that although Zionism has influenced Hezbollah's anti-Judaism, "it is not contingent upon it" because Hezbollah's hatred of Jews is more religiously motivated than politically motivated.

== Jews in the Quran ==
=== Jews in the Meccan period ===
The Meccan Quran mentions Jews directly, and under other labels like "People of the Book" (ahl al-kitāb) and "Israelite's" (Banū Isrāʾīl). These references are broadly positive. At times, Jews (and Christians) are encouraged to seek Muhammad out for religious advice. At this time, the Quran may not have formed a hard distinction between Jews and Christians, and it may not have required either to convert into Muhammad's religious following.

=== Terms referring to Jews ===
==== Bani Israil ====
The Quran makes 44 specific references to the Banū Isrāʾīl (the Children of Israel). although the term might refer to both Jews and Arab Christians as a single religious lineage. In surah 2:140 of the Quran, Jews (Yahūdi) are considered a religious group, while Banū Isrāʾīl are an ethnic group.

==== Yahud and Yahudi ====
The Arabic terms Yahūd (Jews) and Yahūdi (Jew), occur 11 times, and the verb hāda (meaning "to be a Jew") occurs 10 times. According to Khalid Duran, the negative passages use Yahūd, while the positive references speak mainly of the Banū Isrāʾīl.

=== Negative references to Jews ===
The references in the Quran to Jews are interpreted in different ways. According to Frederick M. Schweitzer and Marvin Perry, these references are "mostly negative". According to Tahir Abbas, the general references to Jews are favorable, with only those addressed to particular groups of Jews containing harsh criticism.

=== Adoption of Jewish practices ===
According to Bernard Lewis and some other scholars, the earliest verses of the Quran were largely sympathetic to Jews. Muhammad admired them as fellow monotheists and saw them as natural adherents to his new faith. Early Islam followed similar religious practices to Jews, and may have been modeled to a degree on Judaism:

- Jewish prayer is fixed and mandatory at least three times daily, depending on the day of the week and the time of year, with Shacharit (Hebrew: שַׁחֲרִית) as the morning service, Mincha (מִנְחָה) as the afternoon service, and Ma'ariv (מַעֲרִיב) as the evening service. On Shabbat, which begins with Kabbalat Shabbat and Ma'ariv every Friday night, Jews congregate to pray, engage in Torah study, and rest. Jews have prayed toward the site of the Jerusalem Temple since the compilation of tractate Berkahot in the Talmud, if not before. Jews observe fasts and holy days other than Shabbat throughout the Hebrew year.
- Similarly, Muslims are obligated to perform Salah five times daily according to fixed prayer times. Muslims congregate on Yawm al-Jum'ah ('Day of Congregation') for Friday prayers (though Friday is not considered a holy day like Shabbat). Until 623 CE, the Islamic qibla was Jerusalem. Muslims observe fasts like Ramadan and religious holidays.

=== Judaism in Quranic theology ===
According to Bernard Lewis, there is nothing in Islamic theology, with one single exception, that can be considered refutations of Judaism or ferocious anti-Jewish diatribes. Lewis and Chanes suggest that, for a variety of reasons, Muslims were not antisemitic for the most part. The Quran, like Judaism, orders Muslims to profess strict monotheism. It also rejects the stories of Jewish deicide as a blasphemous absurdity, and other similar stories in the Gospels play no part in the Muslim educational system. The Quran does not present itself as a fulfillment of the Hebrew Bible but rather a restoration of its original message (see Tahrif for such claimed alterations and Tawrat for the Islamic understanding of the Torah as an Islamic holy book). In such a line of argument, no clash of interpretations between Judaism and Islam can arise.

In addition, Lewis argues that the Quran lacks the popular Western traditions of 'guilt and betrayal'. Rosenblatt and Pinson suggest that the Quran teaches tolerance toward Judaism as a fellow monotheistic faith.

Lewis adds that negative attributes ascribed to subject religions (in this case Judaism and Christianity) are usually expressed in religious and social terms, but only rarely in ethnic or racial terms. However, this does sometimes occur. The language of abuse is often quite strong. Lewis adduces that three Quranic verses (2:65, 5:60, 7:166) ground conventional Muslim epithets for Jews (as apes) and Christians (as pigs). The interpretation of these 'enigmatic' passages in Islamic exegetics is highly complex, dealing as they do with infractions like breaking the Sabbath. According to Goitein, the idea of Jewish Sabbath breakers turning into apes may reflect the influence of Yemeni midrashim. Firestone notes that the Qurayza tribe itself is described in Muslim sources as using the trope of being turned into apes if one breaks the Sabbath to justify not exploiting the Sabbath in order to attack Mohammad, when they were under siege.

According to Stillman, the Quran praises Moses, and depicts the Israelites as the recipients of divine favour. The Quran dedicates multiple verses to the glorification of Hebrew prophets, says Leon Poliakov. He quotes verse 6:85 as an example,

And We blessed him with Isaac and Jacob. We guided them all as We previously guided Noah and those among his descendants: David, Solomon, Job, Joseph, Moses, and Aaron. This is how We reward the good-doers. Likewise, ˹We guided˺ Zachariah, John, Jesus, and Elias, who were all of the righteous. ˹We also guided˺ Ishmael, Elisha, Jonah, and Lot, favouring each over other people ˹of their time˺.

=== Quranic remarks about Jews ===
Leon Poliakov, Walter Laqueur, and Jane Gerber, argue that passages in the Quran reproach Jews for their refusal to recognize Muhammad as a prophet of God. "The Quran is engaged mainly in dealing with the sinners among the Jews, and the attack on them is shaped according to models that one encounters in the New Testament." The Muslim holy text defined the Arab and Muslim attitude towards Jews to this day, especially in the periods when Islamic fundamentalism was on the rise.

Walter Laqueur states that the Quran and its interpreters have a great many conflicting things to say about the Jews. Jews are said to be treacherous and hypocritical and could never be friends with a Muslim.

Frederick M. Schweitzer and Marvin Perry state that references to Jews in the Quran are mostly negative. The Quran states that wretchedness and baseness were stamped upon the Jews, and they were visited with wrath from Allah, that was because they disbelieved in Allah's revelations and slew the prophets wrongfully. And for their taking usury, which was prohibited for them, and because of their consuming people's wealth under false pretense, a painful punishment was prepared for them. The Quran requires their "abasement and poverty" in the form of the poll tax jizya. In his "wrath," God has "cursed" the Jews and will turn them into apes/monkeys and swine and idol worshipers because they are "infidels".

According to Martin Kramer, the Quran negatively speaks of Jews and reports instances of Jewish treachery against the Islamic prophet Muhammad. However, Islam did not hold up those Jews who practiced treachery against Muhammad as archetypes, nor did it portray treachery as the embodiment of Jews in all times and places. The Quran also attests to Muhammad's amicable relations with Jews.

While traditional religious supremacism played a role in the Islamic view of Jews, the same attitude applied to Christians and other non-Muslims. Islamic tradition regards Jews as a legitimate community of believers in God (called "people of the Book") legally entitled to sufferance.

The standard Quranic reference to Jews is the verse 2:61–62. It says:

And ˹remember˺ when you said, "O Moses! We cannot endure the same meal ˹every day˺. So ˹just˺ call upon your Lord on our behalf, He will bring forth for us some of what the earth produces of herbs, cucumbers, garlic, lentils, and onions." Moses scolded ˹them˺, "Do you exchange what is better for what is worse? ˹You can˺ go down to any village and you will find what you have asked for." They were stricken with disgrace and misery, and they invited the displeasure of Allah for rejecting Allah's signs and unjustly killing the prophets. This is ˹a fair reward˺ for their disobedience and violations. Indeed, the believers, Jews, Christians, and Sabians—whoever ˹truly˺ believes in Allah and the Last Day and does good will have their reward with their Lord. And there will be no fear for them, nor will they grieve.

— Surah Al-Baqara 2:61–62

However, due to the Quran's timely process of storytelling, some scholars argue that all references to Jews or other groups within the Quran refer only to certain populations at a certain point in history. Also, the Quran praises some Jews in 5:69: "Indeed, the believers, Jews, Sabians and Christians—whoever ˹truly˺ believes in Allah and the Last Day and does good, there will be no fear for them, nor will they grieve."

The Quran gives credence to the Christian claim of Jews scheming against Jesus, " ... but God also schemed, and God is the best of schemers." (Quran 3:54) In the mainstream Muslim view, the crucifixion of Jesus was an illusion, and thus the Jewish plots against him failed. According to Gerber, in multiple verses (Quran 3:63; 3:71; 4:46; 4:160–161; 5:41–44, 5:63–64, 5:82; 6:92) the Quran accuses Jews of altering the Scripture. According to Gabriel Said Reynolds, "the Qur'ān makes 'the killing of the prophets' one of the principal characteristics of the Jews"; although the Quran emphasizes the killing of the Jewish prophets by the Israelites, Reynolds remarks that none of them were killed by the Israelites according to the Biblical account.

If we look to Islamic tradition for the answer to this question we might come to the conclusion that Muhammad's rivalry with the Jews of Medina led him to develop increasingly hostile anti-Jewish polemic. This is the sort of conclusion suggested by the Encyclopaedia of Islam article on Jews by Norman Stillman. Speaking of the Medinan period of Muhammad's career, Stillman comments: "During this fateful time, fraught with tension after the Hidjra, when Muhammad encountered contradiction, ridicule and rejection from the Jewish scholars in Medina, he came to adopt a radically more negative view of the people of the Book who had received earlier scriptures".

— Gabriel Said Reynolds

But the Quran differentiates between "good and bad" Jews, adding to the idea that the Jewish people or their religion itself are not the target of the story-telling process. Rubin claims the criticisms deal mainly "with the sinners among the Jews and the attack on them is shaped according to models that one encounters in the New Testament." The Quran also speaks favorably of Jews. Though it also criticizes them for not being grateful for God's blessing on them, the harsh criticisms are only addressed towards a particular group of Jews, which is clear from the context of the Quranic verses, but translations usually confuse this by using the general term "Jews". To judge Jews based on the deeds of some of their ancestors is an anti-Quranic idea.

Ali S. Asani suggests that the Quran endorses the establishment of religiously and culturally plural societies, and this endorsement has affected the treatment of religious minorities in Muslim lands throughout history. He cites the endorsement of pluralism to explain why violent forms of antisemitism generated in medieval and modern Europe, culminating in the Holocaust, never occurred in regions under Muslim rule.

Some verses of the Quran, notably 2:256, preach tolerance towards members of the Jewish faith. According to Kramer, Jews are regarded as members of a legitimate community of believers in God, "people of the Book", and therefore legally entitled to sufferance.

As one of the five pillars of Islam Muslims perform daily Salat prayers, which involves reciting the first chapter of the Qur'an, the Al-Fatiha. Most commentators suggest that the description, "those who earn Thine anger" in Al-Fatiha 1:7 refers to the Jews. Israel Shrenzel, former chief analyst in the Arabic section of the research division of the Shin Bet and a current teacher in Tel Aviv University's department of Arabic and Islamic studies wrote, "Given that there is contradiction between the content and message of the two groups of verses – those hostile to Jews and those tolerant toward them – the question is which group is to be adopted nowadays by the Muslim scholars and masses. The more dominant view adheres to the first group".

== Hostilities during Muhammad's lifetime ==
During Muhammad's life, Jews lived on the Arabian Peninsula, especially in and around Medina. Muhammad is known to have had a Jewish wife, Safiyya bint Huyayy, who subsequently converted to Islam. Safiyya, who was previously the wife of Kenana ibn al-Rabi, was selected by Muhammad as his bride after the Battle of Khaybar.

According to Islamic sources, the Medinian Jews began to develop friendly alliances with Muhammad's enemies in Mecca so they could overthrow him, despite the fact that they had promised, in the Constitution of Medina, to take his side and fight against his enemies. Two Jewish tribes were expelled and the third one was wiped out. The Banu Qaynuqa was expelled for their hostility against the Muslims and for mocking them. The Banu Nadir was expelled after they attempted to assassinate Muhammad. The last one, the Banu Qurayza, was wiped out after the Battle of Trench, in which they allegedly attempted to ally themselves with the invading Quraysh.

Samuel Rosenblatt opines that these incidents were not part of policies directed exclusively against Jews, and Muhammad was more severe with his pagan Arab relatives. In addition, Muhammad's conflict with Jews was considered of rather minor importance. According to Lewis, since the clash of Judaism and Islam was resolved and ended with the victory of the Muslims during Muhammad's lifetime, no unresolved theological dispute among Muslims fueled antisemitism. There is also a difference between the Jewish denial of the Christian message and the Jewish denial of the Muslim message, because Muhammad never claimed to be the Messiah nor did he claim to be the Son of God; however, he is referred to as "the Apostle of God." The cause of Muhammad's death is disputable, though the Hadith tends to suggest he may have eventually succumbed to being poisoned at Khaybar by one of his surviving Jewish widows.

According to Rosenblatt, Muhammad's disputes with the neighboring Jewish tribes left no marked traces on his immediate successors (known as caliphs). The first caliphs generally based their treatment of Jews upon the Quranic verses that encourage tolerance. Classical commentators viewed Muhammad's struggle with the Jews as a minor episode in his career, but the interpretation of it has shifted in modern times.

=== Muhammad and the Banu Qaynuqa ===
The Banu Qaynuqa were expelled from Medina in 624 CE. In March 624 CE, Muslims led by Muhammad defeated the Meccans of the Banu Quraysh tribe in the Battle of Badr. Ibn Ishaq writes that a dispute broke out between the Muslims and the Banu Qaynuqa (the allies of the Khazraj tribe) soon afterwards. When a Muslim woman visited a jeweler's shop in the Qaynuqa marketplace, she was pestered to uncover her hair. The goldsmith, a Jew, pinned her clothing such that, upon getting up, she was stripped naked. A Muslim man, coming upon the resulting commotion, killed the shopkeeper in retaliation. A mob of Jews from the Qaynuqa tribe then pounced on the Muslim man and killed him. This escalated to a chain of revenge killings, and enmity grew between Muslims and the Banu Qaynuqa.

Traditional Islamic sources view these episodes as a violation of the Constitution of Medina. Muhammad himself regarded this as casus belli. However, Islamic studies scholars often do not find in these events the underlying reason for Muhammad's attack on the Qaynuqa. Fred Donner argues that Muhammad turned against the Banu Qaynuqa because, as artisans and traders, the latter were in close contact with Meccan merchants. Dutch early twentieth-century Semiticist Arent Jan Weinsinck viewed the episodes cited by Muslim historians used to justify the Jews' expulsion as having no more than anecdotal value. He writes that the Jews had assumed a contentious attitude towards Muhammad, and as a group possessing substantial independent power, they posed a great danger. Wensinck thus concludes that Muhammad, strengthened by the victory at the Battle of Badr, soon resolved to eliminate the Jewish opposition to himself. Norman Stillman also believes that Muhammad decided to move against the Jews of Medina after being strengthened in the wake of the Battle of Badr.

Thus, in 624 CE, Muhammad approached the Banu Qaynuqa, gathered them in the marketplace, and warned them to stop their hostility, lest they suffer the same fate as the Quraysh at Badr. He also told them to accept Islam, saying he was a prophet sent by God, supposedly per the Hebrew Bible. The tribe responded by mocking Muhammad's followers for accepting him as a prophet and also mocked their victory at Badr, saying the Quraysh had no knowledge of war. They then warned him that if he ever fought with them, he would know that they were real men. This response was viewed as a declaration of war. Muhammad then besieged the Banu Qaynuqa, after which the tribe surrendered unconditionally and was expelled from Medina.

In 625 CE, the Banu Nadir tribe was evicted from Medina after they attempted to assassinate Muhammad. In 627 CE, when the Quraysh and their allies besieged the city in the Battle of the Trench, the Qurayza initially tried to remain neutral but eventually entered into negotiations with the besieging army, violating the Constitution of Medina. Subsequently, the tribe was charged with treason and besieged by the Muslims commanded by Muhammad. The Banu Qurayza eventually surrendered, and their men were beheaded. The 'spoils' of battle, including enslaved women and children of the tribe, were divided up among the Muslims who had participated in the siege and among the emigrees from Mecca who had until now depended on the help of the native Muslims. Although the Banu Qurayza never took up arms against Muhammad or the Muslims, they entered into negotiations with the invading army and violated the Constitution of Medina. However, Nuaym ibn Masud sowed discord between the invading forces and the Banu Qurayza, thereby breaking down the negotiations.

==== Verses ====
As a result, the direction of Muslim prayer was shifted towards Mecca from Jerusalem soon after migration to Medina because Jews were always undermining the separate identity of Islam . According to Laqueur, conflicting statements about Jews in the Quran have affected Muslim attitudes towards Jews to this day, especially during periods of rising Islamic fundamentalism.

=== The Jewish tribe of Khaybar ===
In 567, Khaybar was invaded and its Jewish inhabitants were driven out by the Ghassanid Arab Christian king Al-Harith ibn Jabalah. He was later released from captivity upon his return to the Levant. A brief account of the campaign is given by Ibn Qutaybah, and potentially also mentioned in the sixth-century Harran inscription. See Irfan Shahid's Byzantium and the Arabs in the Sixth Century for full details.

In the 7th century, Khaybar was inhabited by Jews, who pioneered the cultivation of the oasis and made their living growing date palm trees, as well as through commerce and craftsmanship, accumulating considerable wealth. Some objects found by the Muslims when they entered Khaybar — a siege-engine, 20 bales of Yemenite cloth, and 500 cloaks — point to an intense trade carried out by the Jews. In the past, some scholars attempted to explain the siege engine by suggesting that it was used to settle quarrels among the community's families. Today, most academics believe it was stored in a depôt for future sale, in the same way that the Jews had sold swords, lances, shields, and other weaponry to Arabs. Equally, the cloth and the cloaks may have been intended for sale, as it was unlikely that such a quantity of luxury goods was kept for the exclusive use of the Jews.

The oasis was divided into three regions: al-Natat, al-Shikk, and al-Katiba, probably separated by natural divisions, such as the desert, lava drifts, and swamps. Each of these regions contained several fortresses or redoubts, each with homes, storehouses, and stables. Each fortress was occupied by a separate family and surrounded by cultivated fields and palm groves. To improve their defensive capabilities, the settlers built fortresses on hills or basalt rocks.

Jews continued to live in the oasis for several more years afterwards until they were finally expelled by the caliph Umar. The imposition of tribute upon the conquered Jews of the Khaybar Fortress served as a precedent. Islamic law came to require exaction of tribute known as jizya from dhimmis (i.e., non-Muslims under Muslim rule).

For centuries, the oasis at Khaybar was an important caravan stopping place. The center developed around a series of ancient dams built to hold run-off water from the rain. Around the water catchments, date palms grew. Khaybar became an important date-producing center.

The words "humility" and "humiliation" occur frequently in the Quran and later Muslim literature in relation to Jews. According to Lewis, "This, in Islamic view, is their just punishment for their past rebelliousness, and is manifested in their present impotence between the mighty powers of Christendom and Islam." The standard Quranic reference to Jews is verse 2:61: "And remember ye said: "O Moses! we cannot endure one kind of food (always); so beseech thy Lord for us to produce for us of what the earth groweth, -its pot-herbs, and cucumbers, garlic, lentils, and onions." He said: "Will ye exchange the better for the worse? Go ye down to any town, and ye shall find what ye want!" They were covered with humiliation and misery; they drew on themselves the wrath of Allah. This because they went on rejecting the Signs of Allah and slaying His Messengers without just cause. This because they rebelled and went on transgressing."

Two verses later we read: "And ˹remember˺ when We took a covenant from you and raised the mountain above you ˹saying˺, "Hold firmly to that ˹Scripture˺ which We have given you and observe its teachings so perhaps you will become mindful ˹of Allah˺." Yet you turned away afterwards. Had it not been for Allah's grace and mercy upon you, you would have certainly been of the losers. You are already aware of those of you who broke the Sabbath. We said to them, "Be disgraced apes!" So We made their fate an example to present and future generations, and a lesson to the God-fearing."^{[Quran 2:63]}

The Quran associates Jews with the rejection of God's prophets, including Jesus and Muhammad, thus explaining their resistance to him personally. (Cf. Surah 2:87–91; 5:59, 61, 70, and 82.) It also asserts that Jews and Christians claim to be children of God (Surah 5:18), and that only they will achieve salvation (Surah 2:111). According to the Quran, Jews blasphemously claim that Ezra is the son of God, as Christians claim Jesus is, (Surah 9:30) and that God's hand is fettered (Surah 5:64 – i.e., that they can freely defy God). Some of those who are Jews, "pervert words from their meanings", (Surah 4:44), and because they have committed wrongdoing, God has "forbidden some good things that were previously permitted them", thus explaining Jewish commandments regarding food, Sabbath restrictions on work, and other rulings as a punishment from God (Surah 4:160). They listen for the sake of mendacity (Surah 5:41), twisting the truth, and practice forbidden usury, and therefore they will receive "a painful doom" (Surah 4:161). The Quran gives credence to the Christian claim of Jews scheming against Jesus, "... but God also schemed, and God is the best of schemers"(Surah 3:54). In the Muslim view, the crucifixion of Jesus was an illusion, and thus the supposed Jewish plots against him ended in complete failure. In multiple verses (Surah 3:63, 3:71; 4:46, 4:160–161; 5:41–44, 5:63–64, 5:82; 6:92) the Quran accuses Jews of deliberately obscuring and perverting scripture.

== Jews in the Constitution of Medina ==
After his flight (al-hijra) from Mecca in 622 CE, Muhammad with his followers settled in Yathrib, subsequently renamed Medina al-Nabi ('City of the Prophet'), where he drew up a "social contract", the Constitution of Medina. This contract, known as "the Leaf" (ṣaḥīfa), upheld a peaceful coexistence between Muslims, Jews, and Christians, defining them all, under certain conditions, as constituting the ummah, or "community", of that city and granting freedom of religious thought and practice to all. Alongside the roughly 200 emigrants from Mecca (Muhājirūn) who had followed Muhammad, the population of Yathrib/Medina consisted of the Faithful of Medina (Anṣār, "the Helpers"), Arab Pagans, three Jewish tribes, and some Christians.

The foundational constitution sought to establish, for the first time in history, according to Ali Khan, a formal agreement securing interfaith coexistence, with articles requiring mutual support in the defense of the city:

Those Jews who follow us are entitled to our aid and support so long as they shall not have wronged us or lent assistance (to any enemies) against us

— paragraph 16

To the Jews their own expenses and to the Muslims theirs. They shall help one another in the event of any attack on the people covered by this document. There shall be sincere friendship, exchange of good counsel, fair conduct and no treachery between them.

— paragraph 37

The three local Jewish tribes were the Banu Nadir, the Banu Qurayza, and the Banu Qaynuqa. According to Rodinson, Muhammad had no prejudice against them, and appears to have regarded his own message as substantially the same as that received by Jews at Mount Sinai. Reuven Firestone claims that tribal politics, and Muhammad's deep frustration with Jewish refusals to accept his prophethood, quickly led to a break with all three.

== Jews in Hadith ==
The Hadith—believed to be non-Quranic accounts of Muhammad—use both Banu Israil and Yahud as terms for Jews, the latter term becoming increasingly common and appearing mostly in negative contexts. For example, Jews were "cursed and changed into rats" in Sahih al-Bukhari, 4:54:524 (see also Sahih Muslim, 42:7135 Sahih Muslim, 42:7136).

According to Norman Stillman:

Jews in Medina are singled out as "men whose malice and enmity was aimed at the Apostle of God". The Yahūd in this literature appear not only as malicious, but also deceitful, cowardly and totally lacking resolve. However, they have none of the demonic qualities attributed to them in mediaeval Christian literature, neither is there anything comparable to the overwhelming preoccupation with Jews and Judaism (except perhaps in the narratives on Muhammad's encounters with Medinan Jewry) in Muslim traditional literature. Except for a few notable exceptions ... the Jews in the Sira and the Maghazi are even heroic villains. Their ignominy stands in marked contrast to Muslim heroism, and in general, conforms to the Quranic image of "wretchedness and baseness stamped upon them".

According to Schweitzer and Perry, the Hadith is "even more scathing (than the Quran) in attacking the Jews".

They are debased, cursed, anathematized forever by God and so can never repent and be forgiven; they are cheats and traitors; defiant and stubborn; they killed the prophets; they are liars who falsify scripture and take bribes; as infidels they are ritually unclean, a foul odor emanating from them – such is the image of the Jew in classical Islam, degraded and malevolent.

=== Gharqad tree hadith ===
Sahih Muslim and Sahih al-Bukhari record various recensions of a hadith wherein Muhammad prophesies that the Day of Judgment will not come until Muslims and Jews fight each other. The Muslims will kill the Jews with such success that they will then hide behind stones (or both trees and stones according to various recensions), which will then cry out to a Muslim that a Jew is hiding behind them and ask them to kill the Jew. The only one not to do so will be the Gharqad tree, as it is the tree of the Jews. The following hadith, which forms a part of the Sahih Muslim hadiths, has been quoted multiple times, and it became a part of the Hamas militant organization's original 1988 charter:

The Day of Judgement will not come about until Muslims fight the Jews, when the Jew will hide behind stones and trees. The stones and trees will say O Muslims, O Abdullah, there is a Jew behind me, come and kill him. Only the Gharkad tree, (the Boxthorn tree) would not do that because it is one of the trees of the Jews. (related by al-Bukhari and Muslim).Sahih Muslim, 41:6985, see also Sahih Muslim, 41:6981, Sahih Muslim, 41:6982, Sahih Muslim, 41:6983, Sahih Muslim, 41:6984, Sahih al-Bukhari, 4:56:791,(Sahih al-Bukhari, 4:52:177)

Different interpretations about the Gharqad tree mentioned in the Hadith exist. One interpretation is that the Gharqad tree is an actual tree. Israelis have been alleged to plant the tree around various locations, e.g., their settlements in the West Bank and Gaza Strip, around the Israel Museum, and the Knesset. Other claims about the tree are that it grows outside Jerusalem's Herod's Gate or that it is actually a bush that grows outside Jaffa Gate which some Muslims believe is where Jesus will return to Earth and slay the Dajjal, following the final battle between the Muslims and unbelievers which some believe will take place directly below the Jaffa Gate and the Sultan's Pool. Another interpretation that exists is that the mention of the Gharqad tree is symbolic and is in reference to all the forces of the world believed to conspire with the Jews against Muslims.

== Medieval Islam ==
Jerome Chanes, Koppel Pinson and Samuel Rosenblatt, Mark R. Cohen, Norman Stillman, Uri Avnery, M. Klein, and Bernard Lewis all argue that antisemitism did not emerge in the Muslim world until modern times, because in their view, it was rare in pre-modern Islam. Lewis argues that there is no sign that any deep-rooted feeling of emotional hostility that can be characterized as antisemitism was directed against Jews or any other group. There were, however, clearly negative attitudes, which were partially due to the "normal" feelings of a dominant group towards subject groups. More specifically, the contempt consisted of Muslim contempt for disbelievers.

=== Literature ===
According to Lewis, the outstanding characteristic of the classical Islamic view of Jews is their unimportance. The religious, philosophical, and literary Islamic writings tended to ignore Jews and focused more on Christianity. Although Jews received little praise and faced blame and accusations like blood libels, there were no fears of conspiracy, domination, or evil, nor charges of poisoning wells, spreading plague, or engaging in blood libels until the Ottomans adopted these concepts from their Greek subjects in the 15th century.

Poliakov writes that various examples of medieval Muslim literature portray Judaism as an exemplary pinnacle of faith, and Israel as being destined by this virtue. He quotes stories from The Book of One Thousand and One Nights that portray Jews as pious, virtuous, and devoted to God, and seems to borrow plots from the Midrash. However, Poliakov writes that treatment of Jews in Muslim literature varies, and the tales are meant for pure entertainment, with no didactic aim.

After Samuel ibn Naghrillah, a Jew, attacked the Quran by alleging various contradictions in it, Ibn Hazm, a Moor, criticized him furiously. Ibn Hazm wrote that Ibn Naghrillah was "filled with hatred" and "conceited in his vile soul".

According to Schweitzer and Perry, some literature during the 10th and 11th centuries "made Jews out to be untrustworthy, treacherous oppressors, and exploiters of Muslims". This propaganda sometimes even resulted in outbreaks of violence against Jews. An 11th-century Moorish poem describes Jews as "a criminal people" and blames them for causing social decay, betraying Muslims, and poisoning food and water.

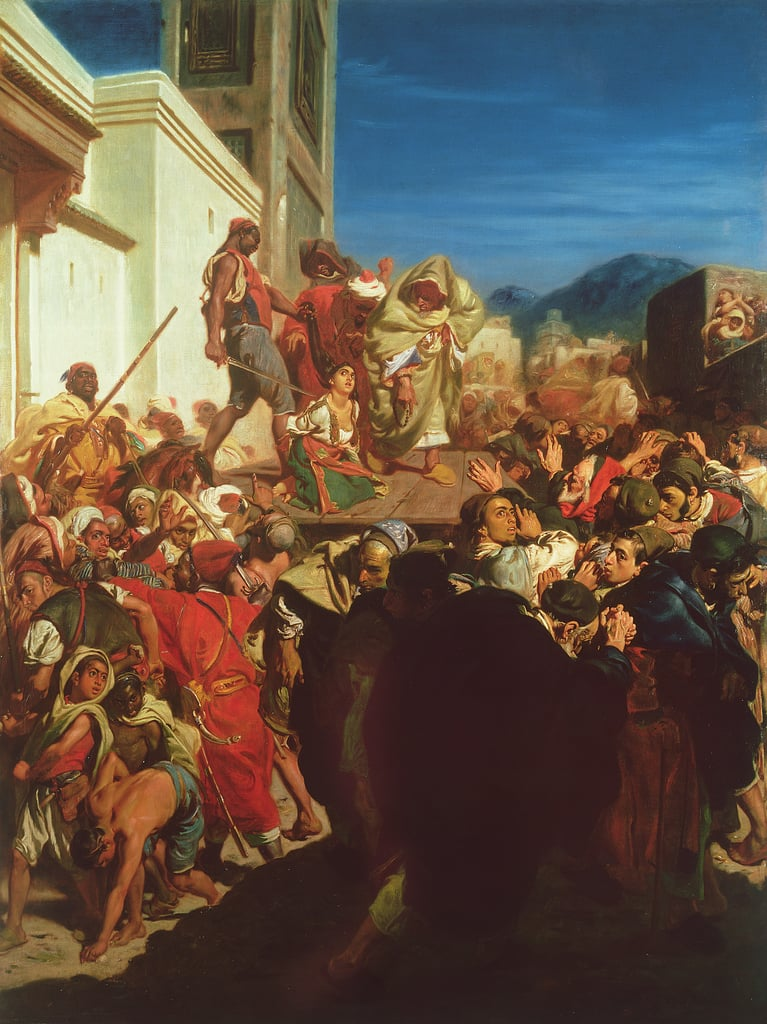
Execution of a Jewess in Morocco (Sol Hachuel), c. 1861; painting by Alfred Dehodencq.

Martin Kramer writes that in Islamic tradition, in striking contrast with the antisemitic Christian concept of the 'eternal Jew', contemporary Jews were not presented as archetypes—as the embodiment of Jews in all times and places.

=== Life under Muslim rule ===
Jews, Christians, Sabians, and Zoroastrians living under early and medieval Muslim rule were known as "People of the Book" (Arabic: أهل الكتاب, romanized: Ahl al-Kitāb) to Muslims and held the status of dhimmi, a status that was later also extended to other non-Muslims like Sikhs, Hindus, Jains, and Buddhists. As dhimma, Jews were to be tolerated, and were entitled to the protection and resources of the ummah, or Muslim community. In return, they had to pay a tax known as the jizya as required by the Quran. Lewis and Poliakov argue that Jewish communities enjoyed toleration and limited rights as long as they accepted Muslim superiority. These rights were legally established and enforced. The restrictions on dhimmi included: payment of higher taxes; at some locations, being forced to wear clothing or some other insignia distinguishing them from Muslims; sometimes barred from holding public office, bearing arms or riding a horse; disqualified as witnesses in litigation involving Muslims; at some locations and times, dhimmi were prevented from repairing existing or erecting new places of worship. Proselytizing on behalf of any faith but Islam was barred.

Dhimmi were subjected to a number of restrictions, the application and severity of which varied with time and place. Restrictions included residency in segregated quarters, obligation to wear distinctive clothing such as the Yellow badge, (Note: In many Islamic countries, Jewish men typically wore tunics, instead of trousers. In the same countries, many different local regulations emerged to make Christian and Jewish dhimmi look distinctive in their public appearance. In 1198, the Almohad caliph Abu Yusuf Yaqub al-Mansur decreed that Jews must wear a dark blue garb, with very large sleeves and a grotesquely oversized hat; his son altered the colour to yellow, a change that may have influenced Catholic ordinances some time later. German ethnographer Erich Brauer (1895–1942) noted that Jews in Yemen were not allowed to wear clothing of any color besides blue.) public subservience to Muslims, prohibitions against proselytizing and against marrying Muslim women, and limited access to the legal system (the testimony of a dhimmi did not count if contradicted by that of a Muslim). Dhimmi had to pay a special poll tax (the jizya), which exempted them from military service, and also from payment of the zakat alms tax required of Muslims. In return, dhimmi were granted limited rights, including a degree of tolerance, community autonomy in personal matters, and protection from being killed outright. Jewish communities, like Christian ones, were typically constituted as semi-autonomous entities, governed by their own laws and leadership, and responsible to the Muslim rulers.

By medieval standards, conditions for Jews under Islam were often more formalized and better than those of Jews in Christian lands. However, treatment of Jews in medieval Christian and Islamic countries greatly varied on ruler and nation. This was in part due to the sharing of minority status with Christians in these lands. There is evidence for this claim in that the status of Jews in lands with no Christian minority was usually worse than their status in lands with one. For example, there were incidents of massacres and ethnic cleansing of Jews in North Africa, especially in Morocco, Libya, and Algeria where eventually Jews were forced to live in ghettos. Decrees ordering the destruction of synagogues were enacted in the Middle Ages in Egypt, Syria, Iraq, and Yemen. At certain times in Yemen, Morocco, and Baghdad, Jews were forced to convert to Islam or face the death penalty.

Later additions to the code included prohibitions on adopting Arab names, studying the Quran, and selling alcoholic beverages. Abdul Aziz Said writes that the Islamic concept of dhimmi, when applied, allowed other cultures to flourish and prevented the general rise of antisemitism. The situation where Jews both enjoyed cultural and economic prosperity at times, but were widely persecuted at other times, was summarised by G. E. Von Grunebaum:

It would not be difficult to put together the names of a very sizable number of Jewish subjects or citizens of the Islamic area who have attained to high rank, to power, to great financial influence, to significant and recognized intellectual attainment; and the same could be done for Christians. But it would again not be difficult to compile a lengthy list of persecutions, arbitrary confiscations, attempted forced conversions, or pogroms.

Schweitzer and Perry give as examples of early Muslim antisemitism: 9th-century "persecution and outbreaks of violence"; 10th- and 11th-century antisemitic propaganda that "made Jews out to be untrustworthy, treacherous oppressors, and exploiters of Muslims". This propaganda "inspired outbreaks of violence and caused many casualties in Egypt". An 11th-century Moorish poem describes Jews as "a criminal people" and alleges that "society is nearing collapse on account of Jewish wealth and domination, their exploitation and betrayal of Muslims; that Jews worship the devil, physicians poison their patients, and Jews poison food and water as required by Judaism, and so on."

Jews under Muslim rule rarely faced martyrdom, exile, or forced conversion to Islam, and they were fairly free to choose their residence and profession. Their freedom and economic condition varied from time to time and place to place. Forced conversions occurred mainly in the Maghreb, especially under the Almohads, a militant dynasty with messianic claims, as well as in Persia, where Shia Muslims were generally less tolerant than their Sunni counterparts. Notable examples of the cases where the choice of residence was taken away from them include confining Jews to walled quarters (mellah) in Morocco beginning from the 15th century and especially since the early 19th century.

=== Egypt and Iraq ===
The caliphs of the Fatimid dynasty in Egypt were known to be Judeophiles, according to Leon Poliakov. They regularly paid to support Jewish institutions (such as the rabbinical academy in Jerusalem). A significant number of their ministers and counselors were Jews. The Abbasids, too, were similarly respectful and tolerant towards the Jews under their rule. Benjamin of Tudela, a famous 12th-century Jewish explorer, described the Caliph al-Abbasi as a "great king and kind unto Israel". Benjamin also further goes on to describe about al-Abassi that "many belonging to the people of Israel are his attendants, he knows all languages and is well-versed in the Law of Israel. He reads and writes the holy language [Hebrew]." He further mentions Muslims and Jews being involved in common devotions, such as visiting the grave of Ezekiel, whom both religions regard as a prophet.

=== Iberian Peninsula ===
With the Muslim conquest of the Iberian Peninsula, Spanish Judaism flourished for several centuries. Thus, what some refer to as the "golden age" for Jews began. During this period, Muslims in Spain tolerated other religions, including Judaism, and created a heterodox society.

Muslim relations with Jews in Spain were not always peaceful, however. The eleventh century saw Muslim pogroms against Jews in Spain; those occurred in Córdoba in 1011 and in Granada in 1066. In the 1066 Granada massacre, a Muslim mob crucified the Jewish vizier Joseph ibn Naghrela and massacred about 4,000 Jews. The Muslim grievance involved was that some Jews had become wealthy, and others had advanced to positions of power.

The Almohad dynasty, which seized rule over Muslim Iberia in the 12th century, offered Christians and Jews the choice of conversion or expulsion; in 1165, one of their rulers ordered that all Jews in the country convert on pain of death (forcing the Jewish rabbi, theologian, philosopher, and physician Maimonides to feign conversion to Islam before fleeing the country). In Egypt, Maimonides resumed practicing Judaism openly only to be accused of apostasy. He was saved from death by Saladin's chief administrator, who held that conversion under coercion is invalid.

During his wanderings, Maimonides also wrote The Yemen Epistle, a famous letter to the Jews of Yemen, who were then experiencing severe persecution at the hands of their Muslim rulers. In it, Maimonides describes his assessment of the treatment of the Jews at the hands of Muslims:

... on account of our sins God has cast us into the midst of this people, the nation of Ishmael [that is, Muslims], who persecute us severely, and who devise ways to harm us and to debase us.... No nation has ever done more harm to Israel. None has matched it in debasing and humiliating us. None has been able to reduce us as they have.... We have borne their imposed degradation, their lies, their absurdities, which are beyond human power to bear.... We have done as our sages of blessed memory have instructed us, bearing the lies and absurdities of Ishmael.... In spite of all this, we are not spared from the ferocity of their wickedness and their outbursts at any time. On the contrary, the more we suffer and choose to conciliate them, the more they choose to act belligerently toward us.

Mark Cohen quotes Haim Hillel Ben-Sasson, a specialist in medieval European Jewish history, who cautioned that Maimonides' condemnation of Islam should be understood "in the context of the harsh persecutions of the 12th century and that furthermore one may say that he was insufficiently aware of the status of the Jews in Christian lands, or did not pay attention to this, when he wrote the letter". Cohen continues by quoting Ben-Sasson, who argues that Jews generally had a better legal and security situation in Muslim countries than Jews had in Christendom.

=== Ottoman Empire ===
While some Muslim states declined, the Ottoman Empire rose as the "greatest Muslim state in history". As long as the empire flourished, the Jews did as well, according to Schweitzer and Perry. In contrast with their treatment of Christians, the Ottomans were more tolerant of Jews and promoted their economic development. The Jews flourished as great merchants, financiers, government officials, traders and artisans. The Ottomans also allowed some Jewish immigration to what was then referred to as Syria, which allowed for Zionists to establish permanent settlements in the 1880s.

=== Contrast to antisemitism in Christian Europe ===
Lewis states that in contrast to Christian antisemitism, the attitude of Muslims towards non-Muslims is not one of hate, fear, or envy, but rather contempt. This contempt is expressed in various ways, such as an abundance of polemic literature which attacks the Christians and occasionally, it also attacks the Jews. "The negative attributes ascribed to the subject religions and their followers are usually expressed in religious and social terms, very rarely are they expressed in ethnic or racial terms, though this sometimes does occur." The language of abuse is often quite strong. The conventional epithets are apes for Jews, and pigs for Christians. Lewis continues with several examples of regulations which symbolize the inferiority that non-Muslims who lived under Muslim rule had to live with, such as different formulae of greetings when addressing Jews and Christians than when addressing Muslims (both in conversations or correspondences), and forbidding Jews and Christians from choosing names that Muslims chose for their children during Ottoman rule.

Schweitzer and Perry argue that there are two general views of the status of Jews under Islam, the traditional "golden age" and the revisionist "persecution and pogrom" interpretations. The former was first promulgated by Jewish historians in the 19th century as a rebuke of the Christian treatment of Jews, and it was taken up by Arab Muslims after 1948 as "an Arab-Islamist weapon in what is primarily an ideological and political struggle against Israel". The revisionists argue that this idealized view ignores "a catalog of lesser-known hatred and massacres". Mark Cohen concurs with this view, arguing that the "myth of an interfaith utopia" went unchallenged until Arabs adopted it as a "propaganda weapon against Zionism", and that this "Arab polemical exploitation" was met with the "counter-myth" of the "neo-lachrymose conception of Jewish-Arab history", which also "cannot be maintained in the light of historical reality".

== Antisemitism in the Islamic Middle East since 1600 CE ==
Antisemitism has increased in the Muslim world during modern times. While Bernard Lewis and Uri Avnery date the increase in antisemitism to the establishment of Israel, M. Klein suggests that antisemitism could have been present in the mid-19th century.

Scholars point to European influences, including those of the Nazis (see below), and the establishment of Israel as the root causes of antisemitism. Norman Stillman explains that increased European commercial, missionary, and imperialist activities during the 19th and 20th centuries brought antisemitic ideas to the Muslim world. Initially, these prejudices only found a reception among Arab Christians because they were too foreign to gain any widespread acceptance among Muslims. However, with the rise of the Arab–Israeli conflict, European antisemitism began to gain acceptance in modern literature.

=== 17th century ===
One of the most prominent acts of Islamic antisemitism took place in Yemen between 1679 and 1680, in an event known as the Mawza Exile. During this event, the Jews living in nearly all cities and towns throughout Yemen were banished by decree of the Imam of Yemen, Al-Mahdi Ahmad.

=== 19th century ===
According to Mark Cohen, Arab antisemitism in the modern world arose relatively recently, in the 19th century, against the backdrop of conflicting Jewish and Arab nationalisms, and it was primarily imported into the Arab world by nationalistically minded Christian Arabs (and only subsequently was it "Islamised").

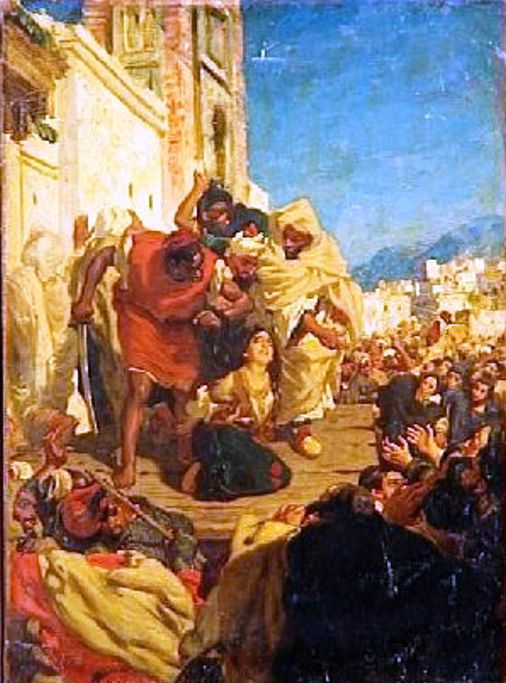
"Execution of a Moroccan Jewess (Sol Hachuel)", painting by Alfred Dehodencq

The Damascus affair occurred in 1840, when an Italian monk and his servant disappeared in Damascus. Immediately following it, a charge of ritual murder was brought against a large number of Jews in the city. All of them were found guilty. The consuls of Britain, France, and Austria protested against the persecution by the Ottoman authorities, and Christians, Muslims, and Jews all played a great role in this affair.

A massacre of Jews also occurred in Baghdad in 1828. There was another massacre in Barfurush in 1867.

In 1839, in the eastern Persian city of Meshed, a mob burst into the Jewish Quarter, burned the synagogue, and destroyed the Torah scrolls. This is known as the Allahdad incident. It was only by forcible conversion that a massacre was averted.

Benny Morris writes that one symbol of Jewish degradation was the phenomenon of stone-throwing at Jews by Muslim children. Morris quotes a 19th-century traveler: "I have seen a little fellow of six years old, with a troop of fat toddlers of only three and four, teaching [them] to throw stones at a Jew, and one little urchin would, with the greatest coolness, waddle up to the man and literally spit upon his Jewish gaberdine. To all this, the Jew is obliged to submit; it would be more than his life was worth to offer to strike a Mahommedan."

=== 20th century ===
==== Origins ====
The origins of modern antisemitic trends in the Islamic World can be traced back to the ideas of the Syrian-Egyptian Salafist theologian Muhammad Rashid Rida (1865–1935 CE), who turned highly antisemitic after the British imperial designs on the Arab World after World War 1 and their co-operation with Zionists to further British objectives. The 1988 Hamas Charter, and particularly its Articles 7 and 22, represented a condensed version of the pan-Islamist anti-Jewish ideas cultivated by Rashid Rida. Rida believed that the international Jewry contributed to Germany's defeat in the First World War; in exchange for Britain's promise to grant them Palestine. Furthermore, he asserted that they controlled the Western Banking System and the Capitalist system, created Communism in Eastern Europe, and led Freemasonry to plot against World Nations. He also drew from Islamic traditions that displayed hostility to Jews and popularised them, rendering the conflict with the Zionists an apocalyptic religious dimension. Rida would persistently cite hadiths regarding the End Times Jewish-Muslim conflicts; some of which would be included in the future Charter of Hamas, such as:

The Jews will fight you and you will be led to dominate them until the rock cries out: "O Muslim! There is a Jew hiding behind me, kill him!"

Rashid Rida condemned the Jews for their arrogance towards the Prophets and arraigned them for abandoning religious values for materialism, all of which made them recipients of Divine Wrath, which led to their downfall. He asserted that Allah decreed Muslims to construct Masjid al-Aqsa in the ruins of the Temple in Jerusalem and favoured Muslims to rule the Holy Lands by implementing shari'a (Islamic law) and upholding Tawhid. Rashid Rida's anti-Zionism was part of his wider campaign as a towering figure in the Pan-Islamist movement and would immensely impact subsequent Islamist, Jihadist and anti-colonial activists. He also severely rebuked Christian Zionists, writing:

"It was astonishing that the intrigues of the Jews seduced many of the Christians of Europe and America by convincing them that believing in the Bible requires helping them to return to Palestine and the possession of Jerusalem … etc., as a confirmation to the prophets and a realization of the appearance of Jesus regarding whose person and deeds the two groups [Jewish and Christian] differed [in their interpretation]. The Jews refer to their Messiah as the earthly king who will come to restore the kingdom of Solomon, whereas the Christians refer to Jesus, son of Mary, who will return in His kingdom to judge the world."

— Muhammad Rashid Rida, in Al-Manar 30/7 pg. 555,

==== Early massacres ====
The massacres of Jews in Muslim countries continued into the 20th century. The Jewish quarter in Fez was almost destroyed by a Muslim mob in 1912. There were Nazi-inspired pogroms in Algeria in the 1930s, and massive attacks on the Jews in Iraq and Libya in the 1940s (see Farhud). Pro-Nazi Muslims slaughtered dozens of Jews in Baghdad in 1941.

American academic Bernard Lewis and others have charged that standard antisemitic themes have become commonplace in the publications of Arab Islamist movements such as Hezbollah and Hamas, in the pronouncements of various agencies of the Islamic Republic of Iran, and even in the newspapers and other publications of Refah Partisi, the Turkish Islamic party whose head served as prime minister in 1996–97." Lewis has also written that the language of abuse is often quite strong, arguing that the conventional epithets for Jews and Christians are apes and pigs, respectively.

On 1 March 1994, Rashid Baz, an American Muslim living in Brooklyn, New York, shot at a van carrying Hassidic Jewish students over the Brooklyn Bridge. The students were returning to Brooklyn after visiting their ailing leader, the Lubavitcher Rebbe, who suffered a stroke two years earlier. Ari Halberstam, one of the students, was killed. Others were wounded. Baz was quoted in his confession in 2007 as saying, "I only shot them because they were Jewish."

==== Relations between Nazi Germany and Muslim countries ====
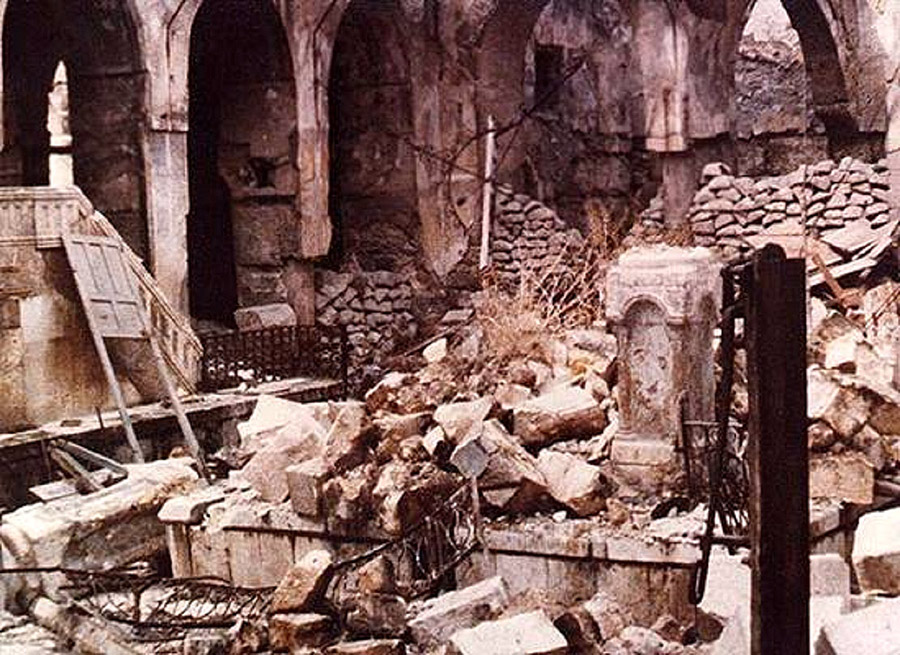
Burning synagogue in Aleppo in 1947

Some Arabs found common cause with Nazi Germany against colonial regimes in the Middle East. The influence of the Nazis grew in the Arab world during the 1930s. Egypt, Syria, and Iran are claimed to have harbored Nazi war criminals, though they have rejected this charge. With the recruiting help of the Grand Mufti of Jerusalem, Amin al-Husseini, the 13th Waffen Mountain Division of the SS Handschar, mostly formed by Muslims in 1943, was the first non-Germanic SS division.

===== Amin al-Husseini =====
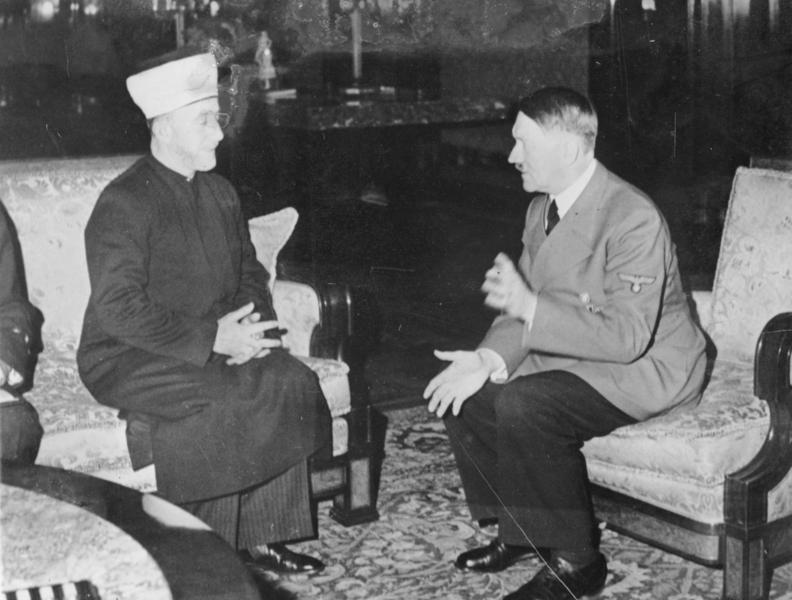
Amin al-Husseini, Grand Mufti of Jerusalem and the chairman of the Supreme Islamic Council meeting with Adolf Hitler (December 1941)

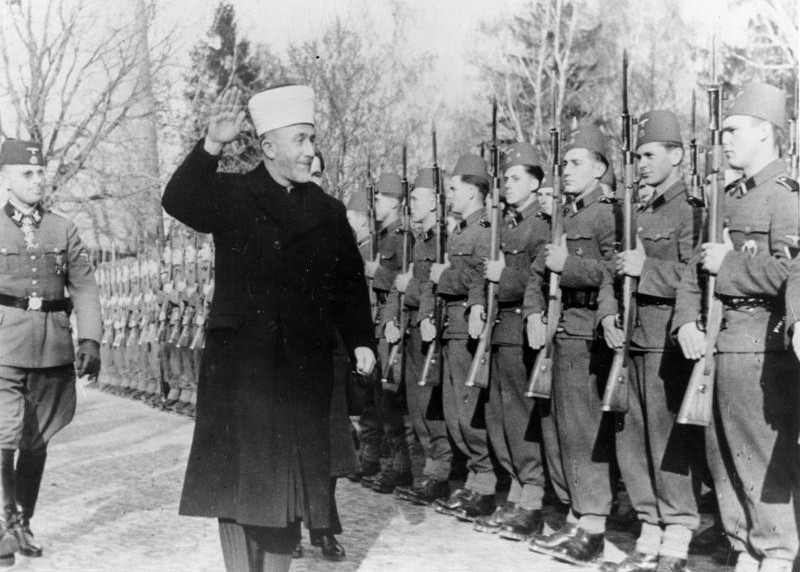
November 1943: al-Husseini greeting Bosnian Muslim Waffen-SS volunteers with a Nazi salute. At left is SS General Karl-Gustav Sauberzweig.

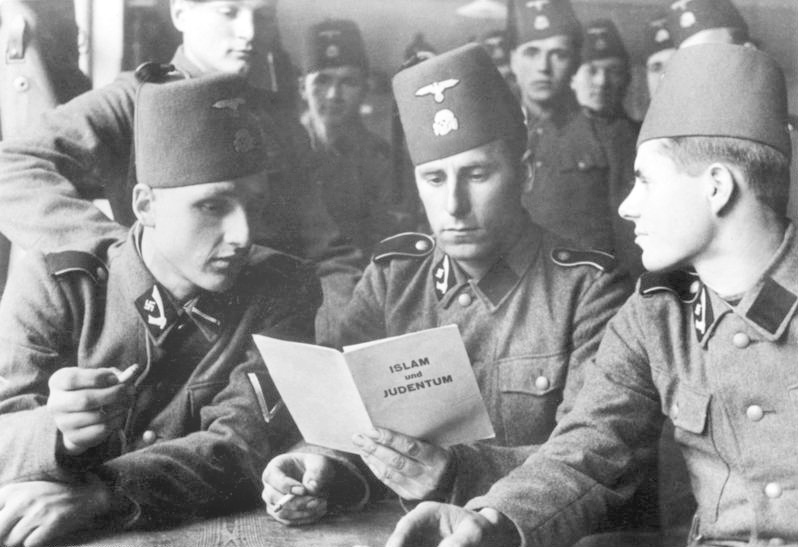
Bosnian Muslim soldiers of the SS "Handschar" reading a Nazi propaganda book, Islam und Judentum, in Nazi-occupied Southern France (Bundesarchiv, June 1943)

The Grand Mufti of Jerusalem, Amin al-Husseini, a pupil of Muhammad Rashid Rida, attempted to create an alliance with Nazi Germany and Fascist Italy in order to obstruct the creation of a Jewish homeland in Palestine, and hinder any emigration by Jewish refugees from the Holocaust there. Historians debate to what extent al-Husseini's fierce opposition to Zionism was based on Arab nationalism or antisemitism, or a combination of the two.

On 31 March 1933, within weeks of Hitler's rise to power in Germany, al-Husseini sent a telegram to Berlin addressed to the German Consul-General in the British Mandate of Palestine saying that Muslims in Palestine and elsewhere looked forward to spreading their ideology in the Middle East. Al-Husseini secretly met the German Consul-General near the Dead Sea in 1933 and expressed his approval of the anti-Jewish boycott in Germany and asked him not to send any Jews to Palestine. Later that year, the Mufti's assistants approached Wolff, seeking his help in establishing an Arab National Socialist party in Palestine. Reports reaching the foreign offices in Berlin showed high levels of Arab admiration of Hitler.

Al-Husseini met the German Foreign Minister, Joachim von Ribbentrop on 20 November 1941, and was officially received by Hitler on 30 November 1941, in Berlin. He asked Hitler for a public declaration that "recognized and sympathized with the Arab struggles for independence and liberation, and that it would support the elimination of a national Jewish homeland", and he submitted to the German government a draft of such a declaration, containing the clause.

Al-Husseini aided the Axis cause in the Middle East by issuing a fatwa for a holy war against Britain in May 1941. The Mufti's proclamation against Britain was declared in Iraq, where he was instrumental in the outbreak of the Anglo-Iraqi War of 1941. During the war, the Mufti repeatedly made requests to "the German government to bomb Tel Aviv".

Al-Husseini was involved in the organization and recruitment of Bosnian Muslims into several divisions of the Waffen SS and other units. and also blessed sabotage teams trained by Germans before they were dispatched to Palestine, Iraq, and Transjordan.

===== Iraq =====
In March 1940, General Rashid Ali, a nationalist Iraqi officer, forced the pro-British Iraqi Prime Minister Nuri Said Pasha to resign. In May, he declared jihad against Great Britain, effectively issuing a declaration of war. Forty days later, British troops had defeated his forces and occupied the country. The 1941 Iraqi coup d'état occurred on 3 April 1941, when the regime of the Regent 'Abd al-Ilah was overthrown, and Rashid Ali was installed as Prime Minister.

In 1941, following Rashid Ali's pro-Axis coup, riots known as the Farhud broke out in Baghdad in which approximately 180 Jews were killed and about 240 were wounded, 586 Jewish-owned businesses were looted and 99 Jewish houses were destroyed.

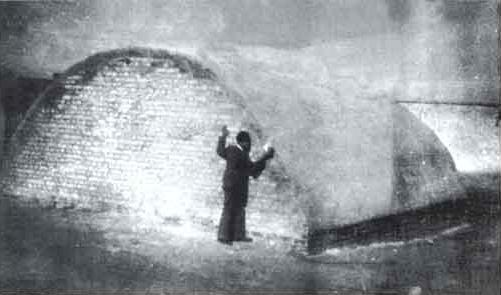
Mass grave of victims of the Farhud, 1941

Iraq initially forbade the emigration of its Jews after the 1948 war because allowing them to go to Israel would strengthen that state, but they were allowed to emigrate again after 1950, if they agreed to forgo their assets.

=== The Ottoman Empire, Turkey, and Iraq ===
==== Forced migrations of Jews and Assyrian Christians between 1842 and the 21st century ====
In his recent PhD thesis and his recent book the Israeli scholar Mordechai Zaken discussed the history of the Assyrian Christians of Turkey and Iraq (in the Kurdish vicinity) during the last 90 years, from 1843 onwards. In his studies Zaken outlines three major eruptions that took place between 1843 and 1933 during which the Assyrian Christians lost their land and hegemony in their habitat in the Hakkārī (or Julamerk) region in southeastern Turkey and became refugees in other lands, notably Iran and Iraq, and they ultimately established exiled communities in European and western countries (the US, Canada, Australia, New-Zealand, Sweden, France, to mention some of these countries). Mordechai Zaken wrote this study from an analytical and comparative point of view, comparing the Assyrian Christians' experience with the experience of the Kurdish Jews who had been dwelling in Kurdistan for two thousand years or so, but were forced to emigrate to Israel in the early 1950s. The Jews of Kurdistan were forced to leave as a result of the Arab-Israeli war, as a result of increasing hostility and acts of violence which were committed against Jews in Iraqi and Kurdish towns and villages, and as a result of a new situation that developed during the 1940s in Iraq and Kurdistan in which the ability of Jews to live in relative comfort and tolerance (that was disrupted from time to time prior to that period) with their Arab and Muslim neighbors, as they had done for a number of years, practically came to an end. In the end, the Jews of Kurdistan had to leave their Kurdish habitat en masse and migrate to Israel. The Assyrian Christians, on the other hand, suffered a similar fate, but they migrated in stages following each political crisis with the regime in whose boundaries they lived or following each conflict with their Muslim, Turkish, or Arab neighbors, or following the departure or expulsion of their patriarch Mar Shimon in 1933, first to Cyprus and then to the United States. Consequently, although there is still a small and fragile community of Assyrians in Iraq, today, millions of Assyrian Christians live in exiled and prosperous communities in the West.

===== Iran =====
Although Iran was officially neutral during the Second World War, Reza Shah sympathized with Nazi Germany, making the Jewish community fearful of possible persecution. Although these fears did not materialise, anti-Jewish articles were published in the Iranian media. Following the Anglo-Soviet invasion of Iran in 1941, Reza Shah was deposed and replaced by his son Mohammad Reza Pahlavi.

However, Kaveh Farrokh argues that there is a misconception that antisemitism was widespread in Iran during Reza Shah's reign. After the Fall of France during the time that Reza Shah was still regent, the head of the Iranian legation in Paris, Abdol Hossein Sardari, used his influence with Nazi contacts to gain exemptions from Nazi race laws for an estimated 2000 Iranian Jews living in Paris at the time. The legation also issued Iranian travel documents for the Iranian Jews and their non-Iranian family members to facilitate travel through Nazi occupied Europe to safety.

===== Egypt =====
In Egypt, Ahmad Husayn founded the Young Egypt Party in 1933. He immediately expressed his sympathy for Nazi Germany to the German ambassador to Egypt. Husayn sent a delegation to the Nuremberg rally and returned with enthusiasm. After the Sudeten Crisis, the party's leaders denounced Germany for aggression against small nations, but they retained elements which were similar to those of Nazism or Fascism, e.g., salutes, torchlight parades, leader worship, and antisemitism and racism. The party's impact before 1939 was minimal, and its espionage efforts were of little value to the Germans.

During World War II, Cairo was a haven for agents and spies throughout the war. Egyptian nationalists were active, with a number of Egyptians, including Farouk of Egypt and prime minister Ali Mahir Pasha, all of whom hoped for an Axis victory, and the complete severance of Egyptian ties with Britain.

==== Islamist and Jihadist groups ====
Antisemitism, alongside anti-Western sentiment, anti-Israeli sentiment, rejection of democracy, and conspiracy theories involving the Jews, is widespread both within Islamism and Jihadism. A number of militant Islamist and Jihadist individuals, groups, and organizations have openly expressed both antisemitic and anti-Zionist views. However, even outside Islamist circles, anti-Jewish and anti-Zionist conspiracism are widespread phenomena in both the Arab world and the Middle East, and it has seen an extraordinary proliferation since the beginning of the Internet Era.

Lashkar-e-Toiba's propaganda arm has declared that the Jews are the "Enemies of Islam", and it has also declared that Israel is the "Enemy of Pakistan".

Hamas has widely been described as an antisemitic organization. It has issued antisemitic leaflets, and its writings and manifestos rely upon antisemitic documents (the Protocols of the Elders of Zion, and other works of European Christian literature), exhibiting antisemitic themes. In 1998, Esther Webman of the Project for the Study of Antisemitism at Tel Aviv University wrote that although the above is true, antisemitism was not the main tenet of Hamas ideology.

In an editorial in The Guardian in January 2006, Khaled Meshaal, the chief of Hamas's political bureau, denied antisemitism on Hamas's part, and he said that the nature of the Israeli–Palestinian conflict was not religious but political. He also said that Hamas has "no problem with Jews who have not attacked us".

The tone and casting of the Israeli-Palestinian conflict as part of an eternal struggle between Muslim and Jews by the Hamas Covenant had become an obstacle for the movement to be able to take part in diplomatic forums involving Western nations. The movement came under pressure to update its founding charter issued in 1988 which called for Israel's destruction and advocated violent means for achieving a Palestinian state. A new charter issued in May 2014 stated that the group does not seek war with the Jewish people but only against Zionism which it holds responsible for "occupation of Palestine", while terming Israel as the "Zionist enemy". It also accepted a Palestinian state within the Green Line as transitional but also advocated "liberation of all of Palestine".

Amal Saad-Ghorayeb, a Shiite scholar and assistant professor at the Lebanese American University has written that Hezbollah is not anti-Zionist, but rather anti-Jewish. She quoted Hassan Nasrallah as saying: "If we searched the entire world for a person more cowardly, despicable, weak and feeble in psyche, mind, ideology and religion, we would not find anyone like the Jew. Notice, I do not say the Israeli." Regarding the official public stance of Hezbollah as a whole, she said that while Hezbollah, "tries to mask its anti-Judaism for public-relations reasons ... a study of its language, spoken and written, reveals an underlying truth." In her book Hezbollah: Politics & Religion, she argues that Hezbollah "believes that Jews, by the nature of Judaism, possess fatal character flaws". Saad-Ghorayeb also said, "Hezbollah's Quranic reading of Jewish history has led its leaders to believe that Jewish theology is evil."

=== 21st century ===
France is home to Europe's largest population of Muslims—about 6 million—as well as the continent's largest community of Jews, about 600,000. Particularly during the beginning of the second intifada, Muslims attacked synagogues throughout France in solidarity with those in Palestine. A number of Jews protested, and the acts were declared "Muslim antisemitism". By 2007, however, attacks were much less severe, and an "all-clear" was perceived. However, during the 2008–2009 Gaza War, tensions between the two communities increased and there were several dozen reported instances of Muslim violence such as arson and assaults. French Jewish leaders complained of "a diffuse kind of antisemitism becoming entrenched in the Muslim community" while Muslim leaders responded that the issues were "political rather than religious" and that Muslim anger is "not against Jews, it's against Israel".

On 28 July 2006, at around 4:00 p.m. Pacific Time, the Seattle Jewish Federation shooting occurred when Naveed Afzal Haq shot six women, one fatally, at the Jewish Federation of Greater Seattle building in the Belltown neighborhood of Seattle, Washington, United States. He shouted, "I'm a Muslim American; I'm angry at Israel" before he began his shooting spree. Police have classified the shooting as a hate crime based on what Haq said during a 9-1-1 call.

In 2012, the Palestinian Authority Grand Mufti of Jerusalem, Muhammad Ahmad Hussein, citing Hadiths, called for the killing of all Jews.

In Egypt, Dar al-Fadhilah published a translation of Henry Ford's antisemitic treatise, The International Jew, complete with distinctly antisemitic imagery on the cover.

In 2014, the Anti-Defamation League published a global survey of worldwide antisemitic attitudes, reporting that in the Middle East, 74% of adults agreed with a majority of the survey's eleven antisemitic propositions, including that "Jews have too much power in international financial markets" and that "Jews are responsible for most of the world's wars."

==== Saudi school books ====
A May 2006 study of Saudi Arabia's revised schoolbook curriculum discovered that the eighth grade books included the following statements,

They are the people of the Sabbath, whose young people God turned into apes, and whose old people God turned into swine to punish them. As cited in Ibn Abbas: The apes are Jews, the keepers of the Sabbath; while the swine are the Christian infidels of the communion of Jesus.

Some of the people of the Sabbath were punished by being turned into apes and swine. Some of them were made to worship the devil, and not God, through consecration, sacrifice, prayer, appeals for help, and other types of worship. Some of the Jews worship the devil. Likewise, some members of this nation worship devil, and not God.

Heads of American publishing houses have issued a statement asking the Saudi government to delete the "hate".

According to the Anti-Defamation League's November 2018 report, Saudi government-published school textbooks for the 2018–19 academic year promoting incitement to hatred or violence against Jews. The Antisemitic material remains in the Saudi text books, as of November 2019.

==== Reconciliation efforts ====
In Western countries, some Islamic groups and individual Muslims have made efforts to reconcile with the Jewish community through dialogue and to oppose antisemitism. For instance, in Britain, there is the group Muslims Against Antisemitism. Islamic studies scholar Tariq Ramadan has been outspoken against antisemitism, stating: "In the name of their faith and conscience, Muslims must take a clear position so that a pernicious atmosphere does not take hold in the Western countries. Nothing in Islam can legitimize xenophobia or the rejection of a human being due to his/her religious creed or ethnicity. One must say unequivocally, with force, that antisemitism is unacceptable and indefensible." Mohammad Khatami, former president of Iran, declared antisemitism to be a "Western phenomenon", having no precedents in Islam, and stating the Muslims and Jews had lived harmoniously in the past. An Iranian newspaper stated that there has been hatred and hostility in history, but conceded that one must distinguish Jews from Zionists.

In North America, the Council on American-Islamic Relations has spoken against some antisemitic violence, such as the 2006 Seattle Jewish Federation shooting. According to the Anti-Defamation League, CAIR has also been affiliated with antisemitic organizations such as Hamas and Hezbollah.

The Saudi mufti, Shaykh Abd al-Aziz Bin Baz, gave a fatwa ruling that negotiating peace with Israel is permissible, as is the pilgrimage to Jerusalem by Muslims. He specifically said:

The Prophet made absolute peace with the Jews of Medina when he went there as an immigrant. That did not entail any love for them or amiability with them. But the Prophet dealt with them, buying from them, talking to them, calling them to God and Islam. When he died, his shield was mortgaged to a Jew, for he had mortgaged it to buy food for his family.

Martin Kramer considers that as "an explicit endorsement of normal relations with Jews".

==== Trends ====
According to Norman Stillman, Antisemitism in the Muslim world increased greatly for more than two decades following 1948 but "peaked by the 1970s, and declined somewhat as the slow process of rapprochement between the Arab world and the state of Israel evolved in the 1980s and 1990s". Johannes J. G. Jansen believes that antisemitism will have no future in the Arab world in the long run. In his view, like other imports from the Western World, antisemitism is unable to establish itself in the private lives of Muslims. In 2004 Khaleel Mohammed said, "Anti-Semitism has become an entrenched tenet of Muslim theology, taught to 95 per cent of the religion's adherents in the Islamic world," a claim immediately dismissed as false and racist by Muslim leaders, who accused Mohammed of destroying efforts at relationship building between Jews and Muslims. In 2010, Moshe Ma'oz, Professor Emeritus of Islamic and Middle Eastern Studies at The Hebrew University, edited a book questioning the common perception Islam is antisemitic or anti-Israel, and maintaining that most Arab regimes and most leading Muslim clerics have a pragmatic attitude to Israel.

According to professor Robert Wistrich, director of the Vidal Sassoon International Center for the Study of Antisemitism (SICSA), the calls for the destruction of Israel by Iran or by Hamas, Hezbollah, Islamic Jihad, or the Muslim Brotherhood, represent a contemporary mode of genocidal antisemitism.

According to the Pew Global Attitudes Project released on 14 August 2005, high percentages of the populations of six Muslim-majority countries have negative views of Jews. To a questionnaire asking respondents to give their views of members of various religions along a spectrum from "very favorable" to "very unfavorable", 60% of Turks, 74% of Pakistanis, 76% of Indonesians, 88% of Moroccans, 99% of Lebanese Muslims and 100% of Jordanians checked either "somewhat unfavorable" or "very unfavorable" for Jews.

== Islamic antisemitism in Europe ==
A 2017 report by the University of Oslo Center for Research on Extremism tentatively suggests that "individuals of Muslim background stand out among perpetrators of antisemitic violence in Western Europe".

=== The Netherlands ===
In the Netherlands, antisemitic incidents, from verbal abuse to violence, are reported, allegedly connected with Islamic youth, mostly boys from Moroccan descent. A phrase made popular during football matches against the so-called 'Jewish football club' AFC Ajax has been adopted by Muslim youth and is frequently heard at pro-Palestinian demonstrations: "Hamas, Hamas, Jews to the gas!" According to the Centre for Information and Documentation on Israel, a pro-Israel group in the Netherlands, in 2009, the number of antisemitic incidents in Amsterdam, a city home to most of the approximately 40,000 Dutch Jews, was said to have doubled compared to 2008. In 2010, Raphael Evers, an Orthodox rabbi in Amsterdam, told the Norwegian newspaper Aftenposten that Jews can no longer be safe in the city anymore due to the risk of violent assaults. "Jews no longer feel at home in the city. Many are considering aliyah to Israel."

=== Belgium ===
There were well over a hundred antisemitic attacks recorded in Belgium in 2009. This was a 100% increase from the year before. The perpetrators were usually young males of immigrant background from the Middle East. In 2009, the Belgian city of Antwerp, often referred to as Europe's last shtetl, experienced a surge in antisemitic violence. Bloeme Evers-Emden, an Amsterdam resident and Auschwitz survivor, was quoted in the newspaper Aftenposten in 2010: "The antisemitism now is even worse than before the Holocaust. The antisemitism has become more violent. Now they are threatening to kill us."

=== France ===
In 2004, France experienced rising levels of Islamic antisemitism and acts that were publicized around the world. In 2006, rising levels of antisemitism were recorded in French schools. Reports related to the tensions between the children of North African Muslim immigrants and North African Jewish children. The climax was reached when Ilan Halimi was tortured to death by the so-called "Barbarians gang", led by Youssouf Fofana. In 2007, over 7,000 members of the community petitioned for asylum in the United States, citing antisemitism in France.

Between 2001 and 2005, an estimated 12,000 French Jews took Aliyah to Israel. Several émigrés cited antisemitism and the growing Arab population as reasons for leaving. At a welcoming ceremony for French Jews in the summer of 2004, then Israeli Prime Minister Ariel Sharon caused controversy when he advised all French Jews to "move immediately" to Israel and escape what he coined "the wildest anti-semitism" in France.

In the first half of 2009, an estimated 631 recorded acts of antisemitism took place in France, more than in the whole of 2008. Speaking to the World Jewish Congress in December 2009, the French Interior Minister Hortefeux described the acts of antisemitism as "a poison to our republic". He also announced that he would appoint a special coordinator for fighting racism and antisemitism.

The rise of antisemitism in modern France has been linked to the intensifying Israeli–Palestinian conflict. Since the Gaza War in 2009, decreases in antisemitism have been reversed. A report compiled by the Coordination Forum for Countering Antisemitism singled out France in particular among Western countries for antisemitism. Between the start of the Israeli offensive in Gaza in late December and the end of it in January, an estimated hundred antisemitic acts were recorded in France. This compares with a total of 250 antisemitic acts in the whole of 2007. In 2012, Mohammed Merah killed four Jews, including three children, at the Ozar HaTorah Jewish school in Toulouse. Shortly after the Charlie Hebdo shooting in 2015, Amedy Coulibaly murdered four Jewish patrons of a Kosher supermarket in Paris and held fifteen people hostage in the Porte de Vincennes siege. In response to these high-profile attacks, Jewish emigration from France to Israel increased by 20%, to 5,100 per year, between 2014 and 2015.

=== Germany ===
According to a 2012 survey, 18% of Turks in Germany believe that Jews are inferior human beings. A "non-representative study" by the Ramer Institute for Jewish-German Relations suggests that antisemitic views were especially prevalent among Germany's native-born Muslim youth and children of immigrants.

A 2023 survey found that 26% of German Muslim respondents agreed with the antisemitic statement that "wealthy Jews are the real rulers of the world", compared to the national average of just 4%, and were overall three or four times more likely than the national average to embrace antisemitic ideology. Seven percent of German Muslim respondents agreed that violence against Jews was acceptable, compared to 2% of the national average.

Perpetrators of antisemitic verbal harassment and physical assault. Attackers are characterised by the victim. An attacker may belong to more than one group. View source data.

In police statistics, more than 90 percent of incidents are counted as "right-wing extremism". According to the Washington Post, government officials and Jewish leaders doubt that figure, because cases with unknown perpetrators and some kinds of attacks automatically get classified as "extreme right". A 2017 study of Jewish perspectives on antisemitism in Germany by Bielefeld University found that individuals and groups which belong to the extreme right and the extreme left were equally represented as perpetrators of antisemitic harassment and assaults, while Muslim assailants committed a large number of the attacks. The study also found that 70% of the participants feared a rise in antisemitism due to immigration, citing potential antisemitism among refugees.

Following the 7 October attacks, dozens of residents of Neukölln celebrated on the streets of the neighbourhood, some handing out sweets and candy. Since then, antisemitism and Holocaust denial among the Muslim population of Germany has surged, with Jew-hatred "becoming mainstream among youths and young adults in some Arab communities". Neukölln's integration commissioner, Güner Balci, stated that antisemitism is "widespread in certain Muslim milieus", and criticised the failure of any of Germany's mosques to condemn unequivocally the violence of the 7 October attacks.

In November 2024, Berlin's chief of police Barbara Slowik also warned that Jews and gay people should hide their identity in order to protect their safety when entering Arab and Muslim-majority neighbourhoods and that "There are certain neighbourhoods where the majority of people of Arab origin live, who also have sympathies for terrorist groups" and are "openly hostile towards Jews". A week earlier, a group of Jewish schoolchildren in a youth soccer team said they were "hunted down" and attacked with knives by pro-Palestinian Arabs.

=== Sweden ===
A government study in 2006 estimated that 5% of the total adult population and 39% of adult Muslims "harbour systematic antisemitic views". The former prime minister Göran Persson described these results as "surprising and terrifying". However, the rabbi of Stockholm's Orthodox Jewish community, Meir Horden, said, "It's not true to say that the Swedes are antisemitic. Some of them are hostile to Israel because they support the weak side, which they perceive the Palestinians to be."

In March 2010, Fredrik Sieradzki told Die Presse, an Austrian Internet publication, that Jews are being "harassed and physically attacked" by "people from the Middle East". However, he added that only a small number of Malmö's 40,000 Muslims "exhibit hatred of Jews". Sieradzk also stated that approximately 30 Jewish families have emigrated from Malmö to Israel in the past year, specifically to escape harassment. Also in March, the Swedish newspaper Skånska Dagbladet reported that attacks on Jews in Malmö totaled 79 in 2009, about twice as many as the previous year, according to police statistics.

In early 2010, the Swedish publication The Local published a series of articles about the growing antisemitism in Malmö, Sweden. In an interview in January 2010, Fredrik Sieradzki of the Jewish Community of Malmö stated, "Threats against Jews have increased steadily in Malmö in recent years, and many young Jewish families are choosing to leave the city. Many feel that the community and local politicians have shown a lack of understanding for how the city's Jewish residents have been marginalized." He also added, "Right now, many Jews in Malmö are really concerned about the situation here and don't believe they have a future here." The Local also reported that Jewish cemeteries and synagogues have repeatedly been defaced with antisemitic graffiti, and a chapel at another Jewish burial site in Malmö was firebombed in 2009. In 2009 the Malmö police received reports of 79 antisemitic incidents, double the number of the previous year (2008). Fredrik Sieradzki, spokesman for the Malmö Jewish community, estimated that the already small Jewish population is shrinking by 5% a year. "Malmö is a place to move away from," he said, citing antisemitism as the primary reason.

In October 2010, The Forward reported on the current state of Jews and the level of antisemitism in Sweden. Henrik Bachner, a writer and professor of history at the University of Lund, claimed that members of the Swedish Parliament have attended anti-Israel rallies where the Israeli flag was burned. In contrast, the flags of Hamas and Hezbollah were waved, and the rhetoric was often antisemitic—not just anti-Israel. But such public rhetoric is not branded hateful and denounced. Charles Small, director of the Yale University Initiative for the Study of Antisemitism, stated, "Sweden is a microcosm of contemporary anti-Semitism. It's a form of acquiescence to radical Islam, which is diametrically opposed to everything Sweden stands for." Per Gudmundson, chief editorial writer for Svenska Dagbladet, has sharply criticized politicians who he claims offer "weak excuses" for Muslims accused of antisemitic crimes. "Politicians say these kids are poor and oppressed, and we have made them hate. They are, in effect, saying the behavior of these kids is in some way our fault." Judith Popinski, an 86-year-old Holocaust survivor, stated that she is no longer invited to schools that have a large Muslim presence to tell her story of surviving the Holocaust. Popinski, who found refuge in Malmö in 1945, stated that, until recently, she told her story in Malmö schools as part of their Holocaust studies program, but that now, a number of schools no longer ask Holocaust survivors to tell their stories, because Muslim students treat them with such disrespect, either ignoring the speakers or walking out of the class. She further stated, "Malmö reminds me of the anti-Semitism I felt as a child in Poland before the war. "I am not safe as a Jew in Sweden anymore."

In December 2010, the Jewish human rights organization Simon Wiesenthal Center issued a travel advisory concerning Sweden, advising Jews to express "extreme caution" when visiting the southern parts of the country due to an increase in verbal and physical harassment of Jewish citizens by Muslims in the city of Malmö.

=== Norway ===
In 2010, the Norwegian Broadcasting Corporation, after one year of research, revealed that antisemitism was common among Norwegian Muslims. Teachers at schools with large shares of Muslims revealed that Muslim students often "praise or admire Adolf Hitler for his killing of Jews", that "Jew-hate is legitimate within vast groups of Muslim students" and that "Muslims laugh or command [teachers] to stop when trying to educate about the Holocaust". Additionally, while some students might protest when some express support for terrorism, none object when students express hatred of Jews. Most of these students were said to be born and raised in Norway. A Jewish father also reported that after school, his child was taken by a Muslim mob out to the forest to be hanged because he was a Jew, although he managed to escape.

=== United Kingdom ===
According to British Muslim journalist Mehdi Hasan, "anti-Semitism isn't just tolerated in some sections of the British Muslim community; it's routine and commonplace". A 2016 survey of 5,446 adult Britons, part of a report titled Anti-Semitism in contemporary Great Britain that was conducted by the London-based Institute for Jewish Policy Research, found that the prevalence of antisemitic views among Muslims was two to four times higher than the rest of the population. Antisemitic views were, on average, twice as high among British Muslims compared to the average British population. Fifty-five percent of British Muslims held at least one antisemitic viewpoint, and the survey found there was a correlation between higher levels of Muslim religiosity and education and their endorsement of antisemitic beliefs. A 2020 poll found that 45% of British Muslims hold a generally favourable view of British Jews, and 18% hold a negative view.

Following the October 7 attacks of Israelis by Palestinians, a UK survey found that 46% of British Muslim respondents said they sympathise with Hamas, a proscribed terrorist organisation in the UK, and the same percentage agreed that "Jews have too much influence over UK government policy". More than 40% agreed with the statement that "Jews have too much power over UK media"; 39% agreed that "Jews have too much power over the UK financial system"; 33.6% agreed that "Jews have too much control of the global media system"; 33.1% agreed that "Jews have too much control over global political leadership"; and 32% wanted Sharia to be implemented in the United Kingdom.

== Influence of Western antisemitism ==
Martin Kramer argues that "Islamic tradition did not hold up those Jews who practiced treachery against Muhammad as archetypes—as the embodiment of Jews in all times and places." Thus for Muslims to embrace the belief that the Jews are the eternal "enemies of God", there must be more at work than the Islamic tradition. Islamic tradition does, however, provide the sources for Islamic antisemitism and "there is no doubt whatsoever that the Islamic tradition provides sources on which Islamic antisemitism now feeds." The modern use of the Quran to support antisemitism is, however, selective and distorting. The fact that multiple Islamic thinkers have spent time in the West has resulted in the absorption of antisemitism, he says. Specifically, Kramer believes that the twin concepts of the "eternal Jew" as the enemy of God and the "arch conspirator" are themes that are borrowed "from the canon of Western religious and racial antisemitism." In his view, Islamic antisemitism is "[l]Like other antisemitism" in that "it has its origins in the anti-rational ideologies of modern Europe, which have now infected the Islamic world."

== See also ==
- Nation of Islam and antisemitism
- Islamofascism
- Political Islam
