= 1988 Hamas charter =

1988 statement of Hamas' values and positions

The Covenant of the Islamic Resistance Movement (Arabic: ميثاق حركة المقاومة الإسلامية حماس), referred to as the Hamas Covenant or Hamas Charter, was issued by Hamas (the Islamic Resistance Movement) on 18 August 1988 and outlines the organization's founding identity, positions, and aims. In 2017, Hamas unveiled a revised charter, without explicitly revoking the 1988 charter.

The original Charter identified Hamas as the Muslim Brotherhood in Palestine and described its members to be god-fearing Muslims raising the banner of Jihad (armed struggle) in "the face of the oppressors". The 1988 charter defines the struggle to be against the Jews and calls for the eventual creation of an Islamic Palestinian state covering the former areas of Mandatory Palestine, and the obliteration or dissolution of Israel. The charter has been criticized for its use of antisemitic language, which some commentators have characterized as incitement to genocide, with the charter explicitly calling for the killing of Jews. Hamas's 2017 charter removed explicitly antisemitic language and stated Hamas's struggle is with Zionists, not Jews.

Since choosing to run candidates for office in elections, Hamas has downplayed the role of its charter. In direct contradiction of the Charter, in 2008 Hamas leader Ismail Haniyeh stated that Hamas would agree to accept a Palestinian state along the 1967 borders, and to offer a long-term truce with Israel. In 2010, Hamas leader Khaled Meshaal stated that the Charter is "a piece of history and no longer relevant, but cannot be changed for internal reasons". Meshaal also stated that Hamas was ending its association with the Muslim Brotherhood. The 2017 charter accepts a Palestinian state along the 1967 borders, though it maintains Hamas's refusal to recognize Israel.

== Background ==
In 1987, twenty years after the Six-Day War, the First Intifada (1987–1993) began as a resistance of Israeli Occupation of Gaza and the West Bank. A popular uprising, the First Intifada was led by multiple groups including Palestinian Islamic Jihad and the Palestine Liberation Organization (PLO). After receiving official recognition as the de facto government, the PLO began to seek a negotiated solution with Israel in the form of a two-state solution. A two-state solution was deemed unacceptable to Hamas, the Palestinian wing of the Muslim Brotherhood, and the charter was written to fill the ideological gap between the PLO and Muslim Brotherhood supporters. According to Hamas's Deputy Foreign Minister Dr. Ahmed Yousef, the Charter "was ratified during the unique circumstances of the Uprising in 1988 as a necessary framework for dealing with a relentless occupation". However, where the Muslim Brotherhood's ideology proposed a universal Islamist vision, Hamas's charter sought to narrow its focus on Palestinian nationalism and a strategy of armed struggle, or violent jihad.

While the PLO was nationalistic, its ideology was considerably more secular in nature compared to Hamas. Like the Muslim Brotherhood, Hamas subscribed to a neo-Salafi jihadi theology that sought national liberation by violence as permitted by divine decree. While its language was far more religious, its political goals were identical to those of the PLO's charter and called for an armed struggle to retrieve the entire land of Palestine as an Islamic waqf.

The original charter's tone and portrayal of the Israeli–Palestinian conflict as a front in an eternal struggle between Muslims and Jews has been an obstacle for the organization's involvement in diplomatic forums involving Western nations. The updated charter published in 2017 walked back many of these assertions while adding questions regarding the ability of Fatah and its leader Mahmoud Abbas to act as the sole legitimate representative for the Palestinians. In addition, the 2017 charter removed many references to the Muslim Brotherhood as the ties had damaged the group's relationship with Egypt, as the government considers the group to be a terrorist organization.

== Relevance of the charter to Hamas' policy ==
Scholars have debated how relevant the 1988 charter was to Hamas' policies.

=== 1987–1993 ===
In 1987–88, during the initial phase of the First Intifada, the 1988 Hamas Charter was written by one older Hamas leader and ratified by Hamas in a slight hurry, as instrument to "maintain the momentum" of the newly risen Palestinian "resistance generation", giving them broad strokes direction, partly expressed in religious Islamic and partly in political terminology; thus the explanation of the charter’s origins and purpose, given by Ahmed Yousef, former senior Political Adviser to Prime Minister Haniyeh, in 2011. The charter, Yousef further added, in those early days reflected the views of the Elders in the face of a "relentless occupation". The details of its religious and political language had not been examined within the framework of international law, and an internal committee review to amend it was shelved out of concern not to offer concessions to Israel on a silver platter, as Fatah had done in the Oslo Accords (1993–95).

=== 1994–2005 ===
Dutch researcher Floor Janssen compared the 1988 charter (and other documents from that period) to Hamas's documents dated 1994-2005. Janssen found a significant shift in Hamas positions from 1988 to 1994-2005:

- In contrast to 1988, Hamas no longer referred to the enemy as "Jews"
- Hamas began introducing its positions on a peaceful solution to the Israeli-Palestinian conflict (a likely consequence of the Oslo Accords), including its offer of a long-term ceasefire or hudna and its openness to negotiations with Israel on its own terms
- Hamas retained its goal of "liberating" Palestine in its entirety

=== 2005 until 2010 ===
In January 2006, Hamas took part for the first time in elections for the Palestinian Legislative Council. This implied writing an electoral program in March 2005 and, after winning those elections, writing a government program in March 2006. Both programs have generally been perceived as more pragmatic and flexible (not mentioning Hamas’ claim to all of mandatory Palestine but just claiming sovereignty for the Palestinian territories), and 'de-emphasizing' Islam, compared to the 1988 charter.

The contrast of those 2005–2006 documents with the 1988 charter raised discussions in Palestine and elsewhere, about whether Hamas had changed its objectives and about how valid their original 1988 charter still was. Khaled Hroub, Palestinian academic, argued (2006) that those 2005–2006 documents "represent (...) an evolution in Hamas’s political thinking toward pragmatism" and that Hamas had "genuinely" changed, but conceded that probably many were still highly skeptical about that idea. Mahmoud al-Zahar, co-founder of Hamas and Foreign Minister of the Palestinian Authority from 2006 until 2007, on the contrary stated in 2006 that Hamas "will not change a single word in its covenant". Similarly, in 2007, Mousa Abu Marzook, Deputy Chairman of the Hamas Political Bureau, stated that the 1988 charter could not be altered because it would look like a compromise not acceptable to the 'street' and risk fracturing the party's unity.

In 2009, Paul Scham and Osama Abu-Irshaid wrote:

Indeed, judging from the organization’s lack of reference to the charter and from the statements since made by Hamas’s leaders, the charter does not appear to be a major influence on Hamas’s actions.

In 2010, Mahmoud al-Zahar, co-founder of Hamas, again indirectly defended the 1988 charter, saying: "Our ultimate plan is [to have] Palestine in its entirety." Yet, at the same time, Hamas offered to negotiate with Israel on the basis of the 1967 borders, indicating a willingness to set aside the refugees issue until some future undetermined date. Thus while Hamas had, at this time, not repudiated the 1988 charter, it was evolving away from it at a rapid pace.

Also in 2010, in a discussion with U.S. Professor Robert Pastor, Hamas leader Khaled Mashal voiced a different perspective: the Charter is "a piece of history and no longer relevant, but cannot be changed for internal reasons". This answer prompted Professor Pastor to surmise that the Quartet on the Middle East (U.S., EU, UN, Russia) deliberately kept referring to the Hamas 1988 Charter instead of to more recent Hamas statements, to have an excuse to ignore and not seriously deal with Hamas.

=== 2011 until 2016 ===
Ahmed Yousef, former Political Adviser to Prime Minister Haniyeh, in January 2011 stated that the 1988 charter must not be read as "a constitution drafted as law" and not any longer be interpreted literally: the Hamas movement "has moved on" from the charter’s content, "accepting a Palestinian state within the 1967 borders and publicly declaring a readiness to explore political solutions", Yousef argued. In May 2011, Mahmoud al-Zahar, co-founder of Hamas, on the contrary, again stressed and explained why Hamas would and could not “recognize” Israel: such a move would counter Hamas' aim to liberate all of Palestine, and deprive future Palestinian generations of the possibility to “liberate” their lands.

A young Hamas analyst stated in 2015: Fatah in the process of the Oslo Accords (1993–95) had changed its charter (towards nonviolence) but received very little in return; therefore, Hamas' most militant elements around 2015 were very reluctant about the then-current process within Hamas to moderate their own charter towards a less martial rhetoric. Similarly, American political scientist Richard Davis analysed in 2016 that the Hamas leadership felt opposite pressures from two sides: international powers urged Hamas to dismiss the relevance of their charter, while the Palestinian domestic constituency dissuaded the Hamas leaders from rewriting their charter.

=== Since 2017 ===
The day after Khaled Mashal, Chairman of Hamas' Political Bureau, on 1 May 2017 had presented a new “political document” (often referred to as ‘new charter’), he was asked: "Will it replace Hamas’ old charter?" Mashal answered: This "new document has been in the making for four years (...) This document reflects our position for now (...) The old charter was a product of its era, 30 years ago. We live in a different world today". Other Hamas leaders since then have repeated Mashal's message: the old Charter should be viewed as "a historical document and part of an earlier stage in [Hamas's] evolution".

== Summary of the 1988 charter ==
- Article 1 describes Hamas as an Islamic Resistance Movement with an ideological programme of Islam.
- Article 2 of Hamas' Charter defines Hamas as a "universal movement" and "one of the branches of the Muslim Brotherhood in Palestine".
- Article 3 says the Movement consists of "Muslims who have given their allegiance to Allah".
- Article 4 says the Movement "welcomes every Muslim who embraces its faith, ideology, follows its programme, keeps its secrets, and wants to belong to its ranks and carry out the duty,"
- Article 5 demonstrates its Salafist roots and connections to the Muslim brotherhood, declaring Islam as its official religion and the Koran as its constitution.
- Article 6 says Hamas is a "distinguished Palestinian movement", and "strives to raise the banner of Allah over every inch of Palestine, for under the wing of Islam followers of all religions can coexist in security and safety where their lives, possessions and rights are concerned". It claims that the world will descend into chaos and war without Islam, quoting Muhammad Iqbal.
- Article 7 describes Hamas as "one of the links in the chain of the struggle against the Zionist invaders" and claims continuity with the followers of the religious and nationalist hero Izz ad-Din al-Qassam from the Great Arab Revolt as well as the Palestinian combatants of the First Arab-Israeli War. It ends with the Sahih Muslim hadith 2922, suggesting that the Day of Judgment would not come until the Muslims fight and kill the Jews.
- Article 8 reiterates the Muslim Brotherhood's slogan of "Allah is its goal, the Prophet is the model, the Qur'an its constitution, jihad its path, and death for the sake of Allah is the loftiest of its wishes."
- Article 9 adapts Muslim Brotherhood's vision to connect the Palestinian crisis with the Islamic solution and advocates "fighting against the false, defeating it and vanquishing it so that justice could prevail".
- Article 11 says Palestine is sacred (waqf) for all Muslims for all time, and it cannot be relinquished by anyone.
- Article 12 affirms that "Nationalism, from the point of view of the Islamic Resistance Movement, is part of the religious creed".
- Article 13 says there is no negotiated settlement possible. Jihad is the only answer.
- Article 14 says the liberation of Palestine is the personal duty of every Palestinian.
- Article 15 says "The day that enemies usurp part of Muslim land, Jihad becomes the individual duty of every Muslim". It states the history of the Crusades into Muslim lands and says the "Palestinian problem is a religious problem".
- Article 16 describes how to go about educating future generations, with an emphasis on religious studies and Islamic history.
- Article 17 declares the role of women in Islamic society to be the "maker of men". It condemns Western organizations such as the Freemasons, Rotary Clubs, and intelligence agencies as "saboteurs" for promoting subversive ideas on women.
- Article 18 defines the role of women as homemakers and child-rearers, providing education and moral guidance to men.
- Article 19 promotes the value of art while promoting Islamic art over "Jahili" art forms.
- Article 20 calls for action "by the people as a single body" against "a vicious enemy which acts in a way similar to Nazism, making no differentiation between man and woman, between children and old people".
- Article 21 promotes "mutual social responsibility" and urges members "to consider the interests of the masses as their own personal interests".
- Article 22 makes sweeping claims about Jewish influence and power. It specifically claims that the Jews were responsible for instigating multiple revolutions and wars, including the French Revolution, World War I, and the Russian Revolution. It also claims that Jews control the United Nations, and that they are supported by "the imperialistic forces in the Capitalist West and Communist East".
- Article 23 expresses support for all Islamic movements "if they reveal good intentions and dedication to Allah".
- Article 24 prohibits "slandering or speaking ill of individuals or groups".
- Article 25 Discourages Islamic movements from seeking foreign support and expresses support for other Palestinian nationalist movements.
- Article 26 allows consultation with other Palestinian movements that are neutral in international affairs.
- Article 27 praises the PLO but condemns its secularism.
- Article 28 has conspiracy charges against Israel and the whole of the Jewish people: "Israel, Judaism and Jews". It claims that "Zionist organizations" aim to destroy society through moral corruption and eliminating Islam, and are responsible for drug trafficking and alcoholism.
- Article 30: calls on "writers, intellectuals, media people, orators, educaters and teachers, and all the various sectors in the Arab and Islamic world" to pursue jihad.
- Article 31 describes Hamas as "a humanistic movement", which "takes care of human rights and is guided by Islamic tolerance when dealing with the followers of other religions". "Under the wing of Islam", it is possible for Islam, Christianity and Judaism "to coexist in peace and quiet with each other" provided that members of other religions do not dispute the sovereignty of Islam in the region.
- Article 32 condemns as co-plotters the "imperialistic powers" seeking to corrupt all Arab countries one by one, leaving Palestine as the final bastion of Islam. States that the Zionists' plan is set forth in The Protocols of the Elders of Zion and that they intend to expand their control from the Nile to the Euphrates.
- Article 33 calls upon Muslims worldwide to work for liberation of Palestine.
- Article 34 represents the Temple Mount in Jerusalem as the axis mundi, the sacred point where divine cosmology and temporal history meet. Along with Article 35, which compares Israel with an imperialist-colonialist movement. The articles reflect and draw upon past examples of Crusader and Mongol invasions, both of which initially were successful but were eventually repelled.
- Article 36 outlines the goals of Hamas.

== Analysis ==
=== Statements about Israel ===
The Preamble to the 1988 Charter stated: "Israel will exist and will continue to exist until Islam will obliterate it, just as it obliterated others before it".

=== Statements about Palestine ===
Article 13 of the charter emphasizes the importance of jihad for the Palestinian question, adding that "initiatives, proposals and international conferences are all a waste of time and vain endeavors".

Article 11 of the Charter states that Palestine is "consecrated for future Moslem generations until Judgement Day" and that it "should not be given up".

=== Ideology ===
The 1988 Charter draws heavily on quotations from the hadith and Qur'an and builds an argument that Jews deserve God's/Allah's enmity and wrath because they received the Scriptures but violated its sacred texts, rejected the signs of Allah, and slew their own prophets. The introduction of the charter identifies Hamas's struggle as a continuation of "Our [long and dangerous] struggle with the Jews...".

Article Seven of the Charter concludes with a quotation from a hadith:

The Day of Judgment will not come until Muslims fight the Jews, when the Jew will hide behind stones and trees. The stones and trees will say, 'O Muslim, O servant of God, there is a Jew behind me, come and kill him.' Only the Gharkad tree would not do that, because it is one of the trees of the Jews.

— Related by al-Bukhari and Muslim ibn al-Hajjaj.

The second paragraph of Article Thirty-Two of the Charter is the following passage:

The Islamic Resistance Movement calls on Arab and Islamic nations to take up the line of serious and persevering action to prevent the success of this horrendous plan, to warn the people of the danger eminating [sic] from leaving the circle of struggle against Zionism. Today it is Palestine, tomorrow it will be one country or another. The Zionist plan is limitless. After Palestine, the Zionists aspire to expand from the Nile to the Euphrates. When they will have digested the region they overtook, they will aspire to further expansion, and so on. Their plan is embodied in the "Protocols of the Elders of Zion", and their present conduct is the best proof of what we are saying.

At the same time, the charter states that Hamas is a humanistic movement that respects human rights, and that Jews, Christians and Muslims can live peacefully under Islamic sovereignty: "Under the wing of Islam, it is possible for the followers of the three religions - Islam, Christianity and Judaism - to coexist in peace and quiet with each other."

Jeffrey Goldberg, writing in The Atlantic magazine, criticized the founding charter of Hamas by labelling it as a "genocidal" document and compared it to The Protocols of the Elders of Zion. (Note that the Charter does specifically state that the Jews have plans as described in the infamous early 20th-century antisemitic trope document, "The Protocols of the Elders of Zion".) Referring to the charter in an article in The New Yorker magazine, American commentator Philip Gourevitch accused Hamas leadership of having "genocidal" intentions against Jews. According to Bruce Hoffman, the Hamas Charter exhibits "genocidal intentions".

=== Militant jihad ===
The 1988 Charter went further in detailing how Jihad against the Jews was a duty. "The day that enemies usurp part of Moslem land, Jihad becomes the individual duty of every Moslem. In face of the Jews' usurpation of Palestine, it is compulsory that the banner of Jihad be raised. To do this requires the diffusion of Islamic consciousness among the masses, both on the regional, Arab and Islamic levels. It is necessary to instill the spirit of Jihad in the heart of the nation so that they would confront the enemies and join the ranks of the fighters."

=== Antisemitism ===
According to critics, Article 7 of the 1988 charter has been interpreted as "openly dedicate(s) Hamas to genocide against the Jewish people". Authors have characterized the violent language against all Jews in the original Hamas charter as genocidal, incitement to genocide, or antisemitic. The charter attributes collective responsibility to Jews, not just Israelis, for various global issues, including both World Wars. The American Interest magazine wrote that the charter "echoes" Nazi propaganda in claiming that Jews profited during World War II. Jeffrey Goldberg, editor-in-chief of The Atlantic magazine and others have compared statements in the 1988 charter with those that appear in The Protocols of the Elders of Zion.

Ahmed Yassin, the founder of Hamas, responded to accusations that "Hamas hate Jews" by stating in a 1988 interview:

We don't hate Jews and fight Jews because they are Jewish. They are a people of faith and we are a people of faith, and we love all people of faith. If my brother, from my own mother and father and my own faith takes my home and expels me from it, I will fight him... So when a Jew takes my home and expels me from it, I will fight him. I don't fight other countries because I want to be at peace with them, I love all people and wish peace for them, even the Jews. The Jews lived with us all of our lives and we never assaulted them, and they held high positions in government and ministries. But if they take my home and make me a refugee like 4 million Palestinians in exile? Who has more right to this land? The Russian immigrant who left this land 2000 years ago or the one who left 40 years ago? We don't hate the Jews, we only ask for them to give us our rights.

Hamas' 2017 charter removed the explicitly antisemitic language of the original, stating that their struggle is against Zionism and not Jews, while rejecting persecution or denial of rights of any human being on nationalist, religious, or sectarian grounds. It also says that the Jewish question, antisemitism, and the persecution of Jews stem from European history rather than Arab or Muslim heritage, while advancing goals for a Palestinian state that many see as consistent with a two-state solution. In 2025, Hamas stated that the Gaza genocide is "the Auschwitz of the 21st century".

== 2017 revised Hamas charter ==
In May 2017, Hamas issued a new document named A Document of General Principles and Policies (Arabic: وثيقة المبادئ والسياسات العامة لحركة حماس). While the Document of General Principles did not officially replace the 1988 charter, it is often described as the new or revised Hamas charter. The new document advocated for a Palestinian state in the 1967 borders, describing this as a "national consensus"; however, it also continued to describe Israel as an "illegal entity" and retained the organization's commitment to armed struggle While the 1988 Hamas Charter was widely criticized for its antisemitism, the 2017 document stated that Hamas' fight was not with Jews because of their religion, but with the Zionist project that expelled Palestinians from their homes.

Unlike the 1988 Charter, the 2017 charter accepted a Palestinian state within the borders that existed before 1967 and maintained Hamas's refusal to recognize the State of Israel, which it terms the "Zionist entity". The 2017 charter refers to an Israeli state within the pre-1967 borders as a transitional state while also advocating for the "liberation of all of Palestine".

=== Public responses ===
Responses to the 2017 document varied. While some welcomed it as a sign of increased political maturity, an attempt to bridge the gap between moderates and hardliners within Hamas, and a potential step on the way to peace, many others, including Israeli Prime Minister Benjamin Netanyahu, dismissed it as a merely cosmetic effort designed to make Hamas sound more palatable while changing nothing about Hamas' underlying aims and methods.

Nathan Thrall, analyst for the International Crisis Group, on 3 May 2017 suggested that the 1988 charter ("with its talk of obliterating Israel") had since long been causing "quiet embarrassment among more reform-minded Hamas leaders", but that "ambivalence" within the Hamas leadership nevertheless had stopped Hamas, in their new 2017 charter, from fully repudiating that old 1988 charter. Writing in 2020, philosopher Joseph Spoerl commented that the 2017 document "takes all the classical tropes of anti-Semitism and focuses them on Zionism... This can hardly be regarded as a serious repudiation of anti-Semitism."

Around 4 May 2017, with Mashal still in office as Chairman of Hamas' Political Bureau, he was interviewed about the identification of Hamas' enemies as "Zionists" in the new document whereas in the 1988 charter they are also indicated as "the Jews". Mashal stated: "Yes", in the 1988 charter "the expression ['Jews'] was used", which he described as "not as accurate", emphasizing that Hamas' struggle "from the very start" was against "the Israeli occupier ... not because they are Jews, (...) not because of their religion, but because (...) they have occupied our land, and attacked our people, and forced them out of their homes".

In the aftermath of the 2023 Hamas-led attack on Israel, former Ambassador and Wilson Center head Mark Andrew Green described the 2017 revision as having "dressed up [Hamas's] terrorist objectives in more ambiguous, less violent terms," but asserted that the 2023 attacks showed their objective remained "the destruction of the State of Israel and the murder of Jewish people."

== See also ==
- Calls for the destruction of Israel
- Fatah–Hamas conflict
- Human rights in the Palestinian territories
- Incitement to genocide
- Islamic fundamentalism
- List of political parties in the State of Palestine
- Palestinian National Covenant
- Palestinian political violence
- Thawabit

== Sources ==
- Baconi, Tareq (2018). Hamas contained: The rise and pacification of Palestinian resistance. Stanford University Press. ISBN 978-0804797412.
- Janssen, Floor (2009). "Understanding the Islamic Resistance Organization through the concept of framing". Hamas and its Positions Towards Israel: Understanding the Islamic Resistance Organization through the concept of framing. Netherlands Institute of International Relations Clingendael.
- Lybarger, Loren D. (2020). Palestinian Chicago. University of California Press.
- Modongal, Shameer (2023). Islamic Perspectives on International Conflict Resolution:Theological Debates and the Israel-Palestinian Peace Process. Routledge.
- Rane, Halim (2009). Reconstructing Jihad Amid Competing International Norms.
