= Memorias Curiel =

The Memorias Curiel is a chronicle written in Portuguese by Ephraim de Curiel, Jacob de Senior, and later by a son of Jacob, during their time in the Caribbean. It was written during the late seventeenth and eighteenth centuries. Jane S. Gerber described it as one of the most important records of Jews in the Caribbean.

Laura Libman and Hilit Surowitz-Israel described the Memorias Curiel as an 'extraordinary source from Curaçao, which chronicles the growth and development of the island's Jewish community.'

It was written by descendants of Abraham Curiel of Coimbra, a Portuguese physician.

Memorias Curiel and Memorias Senior both chronicle the Dutch West Indies during the eighteenth century.
