= Opinion polling and analysis about Islamic fundamentalism =

Several notable opinion polls have been undertaken on Islam and related topics, including fundamentalism, and Islamic terrorism. Polls have interviewed both Muslim respondents and other groups.

== Countries ==
=== Australia ===
- 2005: In a 2005 Lowy Institute for International Policy Poll 57% of Australians indicated they are worried about the rise of Islamic fundamentalism. Amos N. Guiora noted that this is equivalent to the number of Australians who perceived American Foreign Policy as a threat, he further noted that not just Muslim countries have an unfavourable opinion of the United States but a large number of western countries such as: France, Germany, Great Britain and Spain and concluded that Australia was not an outlier on this regard. The Lowly Institute claimed that the result "raised eyebrows. USA Today also analysed the data as showing that among Australians "57% judged U.S. foreign policy to be as much of a threat as Islamic fundamentalism", USA Today analysed the poll as having a margin of error of 3.1% The Economist claims Paul Keating, Australia's former prime minister was “jolted” by the findings.

=== Egypt ===
- 2011: In Egypt, a survey conducted by Pew Research found that 22% of Egyptians had confidence in Osama bin Laden. Dona J. Stewart, an External Research Associate at the Strategic Studies Institute analysed this as showing favorability for al-Qaeda on the decline in Egypt. To backup this claim she noted a 2006 survey which showed 27% of Egyptians had a favorable view of Bin Laden which went down to 22% in 2011.
- 2009: Research published in 2009 by WPO found that 44% of Egyptians had a favorable view of Osama Bin Laden, whereas 22% had a mixed view and 17% had a negative view. Halim Rane Associate Professor at Griffith University analysed this data and others and concluded that research has shown that support for al-Qaeda and Bin Laden has generally declined over the decade.

=== Jordan ===
- July 2005: 86% of Jordanian people when asked if Suicide bombings against Israelis were justifiable said they supported it, whereas 14% did not. 70% when asked if suicide bombings against Americans and Westerners in Iraq was justifies said "yes" The Free Republic analysed this as showing that the support for suicide bombings by Palestinian against Israelis was widespread however, they believe that the data as a whole shows that "there is broader agreement that suicide attacks in specific circumstances – against Americans and other Westerners in Iraq, and by Palestinians against Israeli citizens - are justified".

=== Turkey ===
- July 2005: 24% of Turkish people when asked if Suicide bombings against Israelis were justifiable said they supported it, whereas 67% did not. The LA Times analysed the entire PEW research poll from which this data came as showing support for terrorism being on the decline and support down since 2004. The Free Republic analysed this as showing that public opinion in Turkey for the support of Palestinian violence on the decline.

=== United Kingdom ===
- August 2006: A YouGov survey revealed that the number of Non Muslims who feel that "a large proportion of British Muslims feel no sense of loyalty to this country and are prepared to condone or even carry out acts of terrorism" was 10% after the 7 July 2005 London bombings, but had increased to 18% a year later in 2006. The "Communities and Local GovernmentCommittee" of the British Parliament, House of Commons referred to this as disheartening/less heartening. Sky News analysed the entire data collected by YouGov (which included the data about loyalty) at that time as showing that a majority of people in Britain feel threatened by Islam.

=== United States ===
- August 2010: A New York Times poll found that 33% of Americans think that Muslim Americans were more "sympathetic to terrorists than other Citizens" Rik Coolsaet analysed this as indicating a high level of distrust directed at the American Muslim community. New York Times did this survey during the Park51 Ground Zero Mosque incident. The New York Times called the findings "appalling" and also analysed the data as showing a very high level of distrust of Muslim-Americans and robust disapproval of the Park51 Mosque proposal. The New Republic stated that it does not trust the poll carried out by the New York Times and that the figures would be higher than 33%. They further claimed that New York residents are tolerant and if the figures were 33% in New York then "non-New Yorker fellow citizens are far more deeply biased and warped than the Gotham locals".

== Regions ==
=== Central Asia ===
- 85% of interviewed Muslims think that homosexuality is morally wrong. 85% think that sex outside of marriage is morally wrong. 61% think that abortion is morally wrong. 38% think that western pop culture harms morality. 12% favor enshrining Sharia. Among these, 62% want religious judges to oversee family law; 38% want severe corporal punishments for criminals; 16% want to execute those who leave Islam.

=== Middle East-North Africa ===
- 93% of interviewed Muslims think that homosexuality is morally wrong. 94% think that sex outside of marriage is morally wrong. 72% think that abortion is morally wrong. 51% think that western pop culture harms morality. 74% favor enshrining Sharia. Among these, 78% want religious judges to oversee family law; 57% want severe corporal punishments for criminals; 56% want to execute those who leave Islam.

=== South Asia ===
- 79% of interviewed Muslims think that homosexuality is morally wrong. 87% think that sex outside of marriage is morally wrong. 64% think that abortion is morally wrong. 59% think that western pop culture harms morality. 84% favor enshrining Sharia. Among these, 78% want religious judges to oversee family law; 81% want severe corporal punishments for criminals; 76% want to execute those who leave Islam.

=== Southeast Asia ===
- 95% of interviewed Muslims think that homosexuality is morally wrong. 94% think that sex outside of marriage is morally wrong. 93% think that abortion is morally wrong. 51% think that western pop culture harms morality. 77% favor enshrining Sharia. Among these, 84% want religious judges to oversee family law; 46% want severe corporal punishments for criminals; 27% want to execute those who leave Islam.

=== Southern-Eastern Europe ===
- 83% of interviewed Muslims think that homosexuality is morally wrong. 67% think that sex outside of marriage is morally wrong. 71% think that abortion is morally wrong. 35% think that western pop culture harms morality. 18% favor enshrining Sharia. Among these, 41% want religious judges to oversee family law; 36% want severe corporal punishments for criminals; 13% want to execute those who leave Islam.

=== Sub-Saharan Africa ===
- 91% of interviewed Muslims think that homosexuality is morally wrong. 78% think that sex outside of marriage is morally wrong. 88% think that abortion is morally wrong. 65% think that western pop culture harms morality. 64% favor enshrining Sharia.
