= Gharqad =

Tree described in Islamic hadith

According to several Sunni Islamic hadiths that describe Islamic eschatology, Gharqad (Arabic: غرقد) is a kind of tree that would protect Jews from Muslims at the end times.

It is mentioned in these hadiths that Abu Huraira reported that the Islamic prophet Muhammad said:

The last hour would not come unless the Muslims will fight against the Jews and the Muslims would kill them until the Jews would hide themselves behind a stone or a tree and a stone or a tree would say: Muslim, or the servant of Allah, there is a Jew behind me; come and kill him; but the tree Gharqad would not say, for it is the tree of the Jews.

It is considered likely that the gharqad tree is of the genus Lycium.

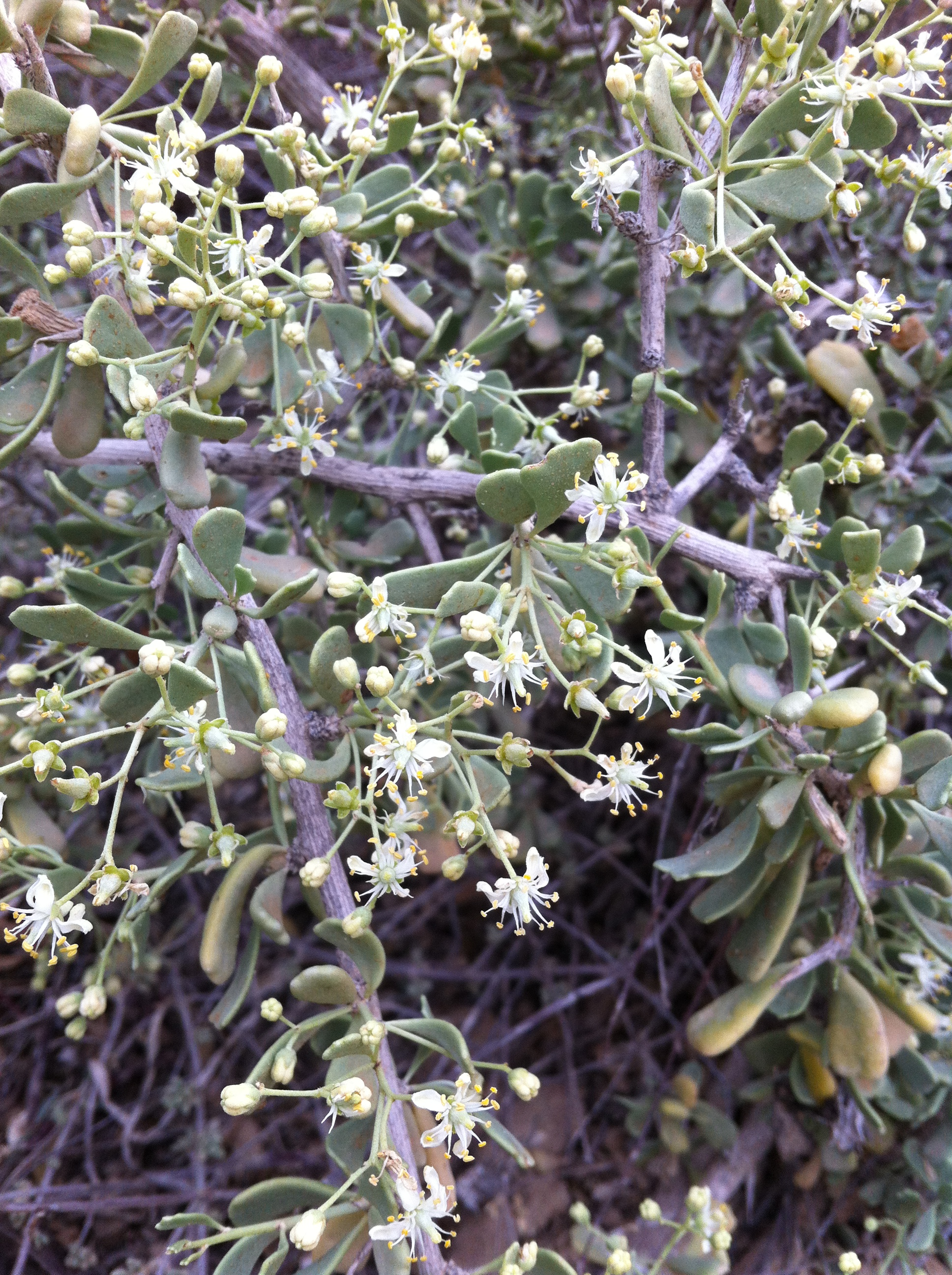
Nitraria retusa

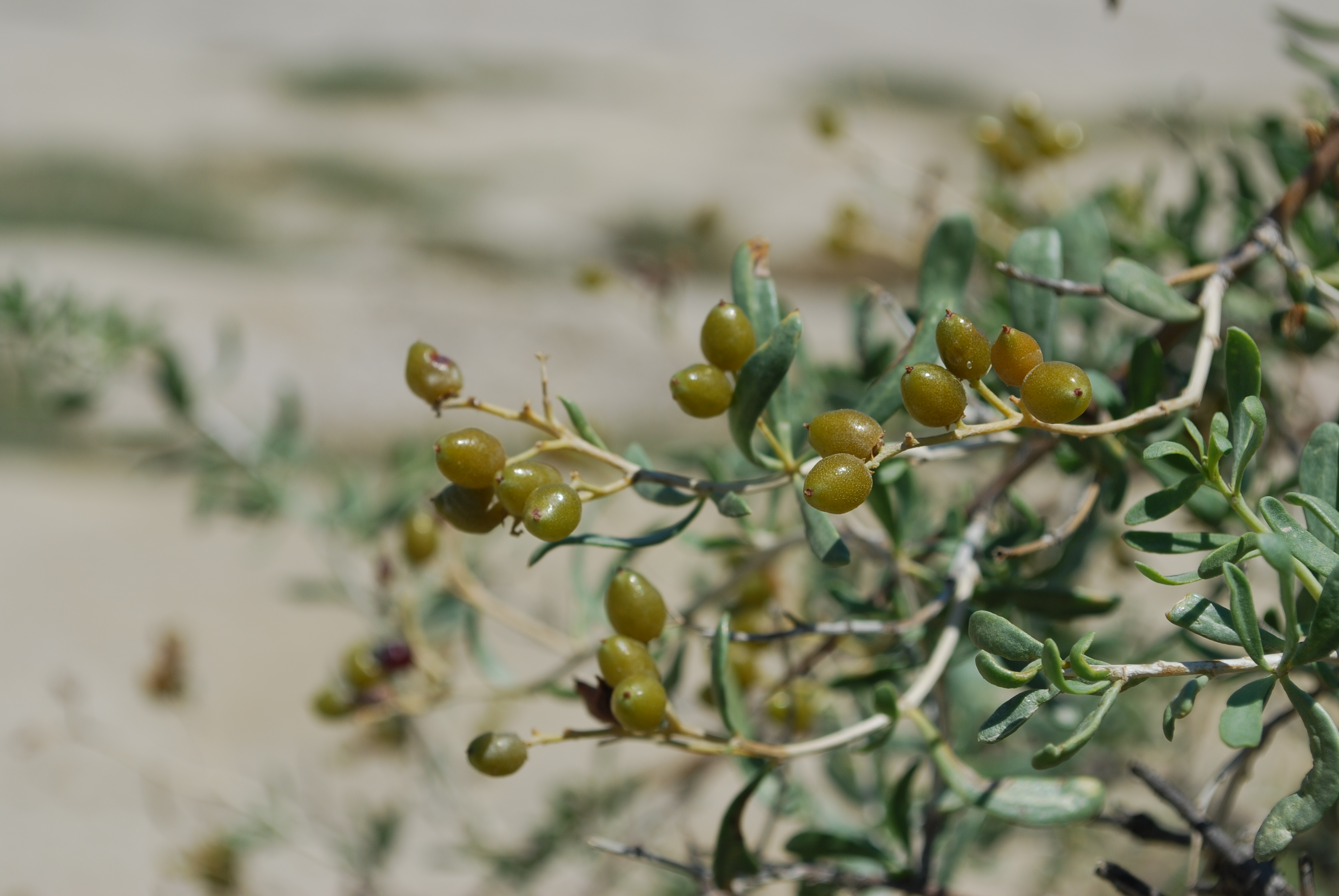
Nitraria schoberi

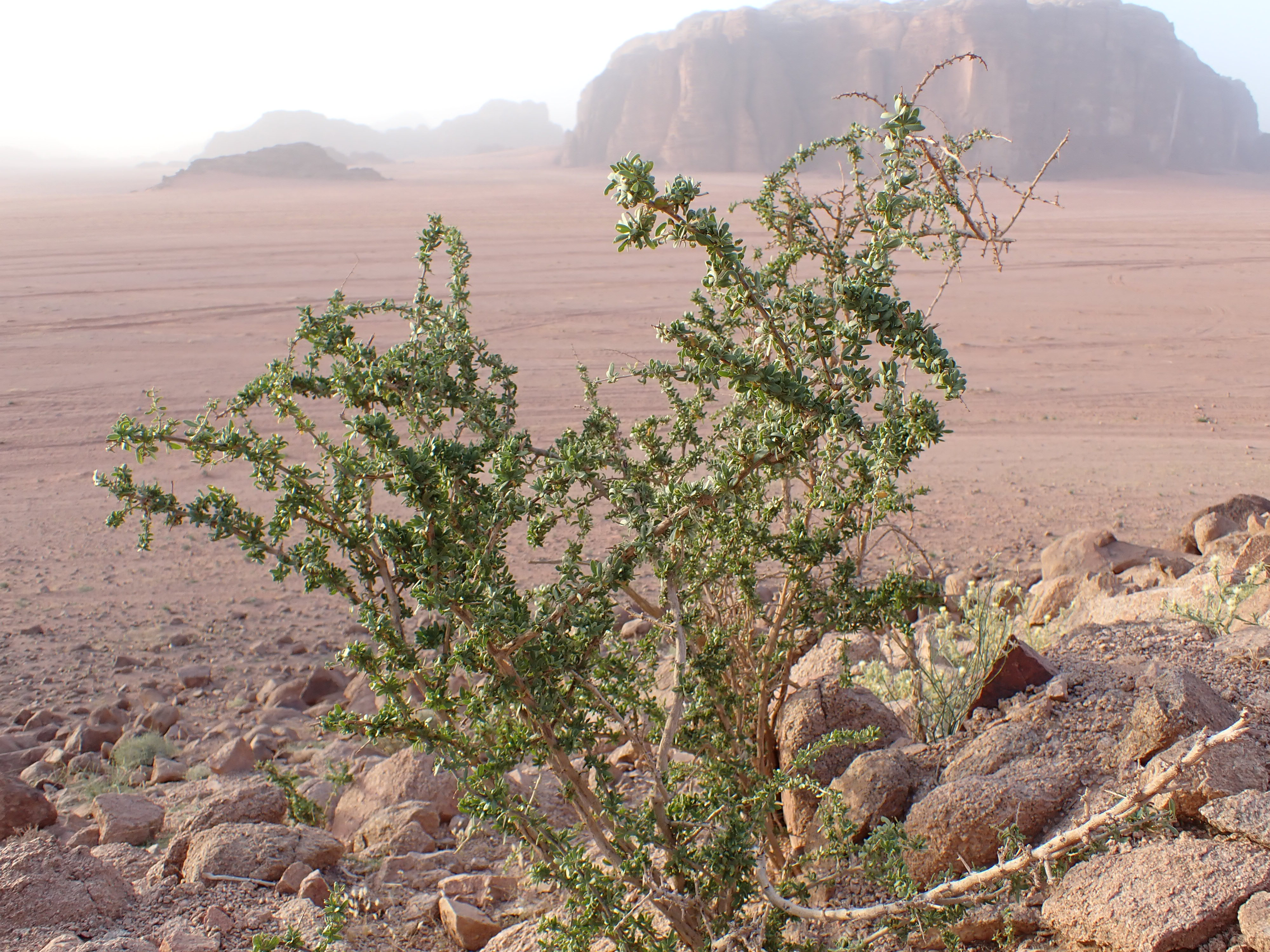
Lycium shawii

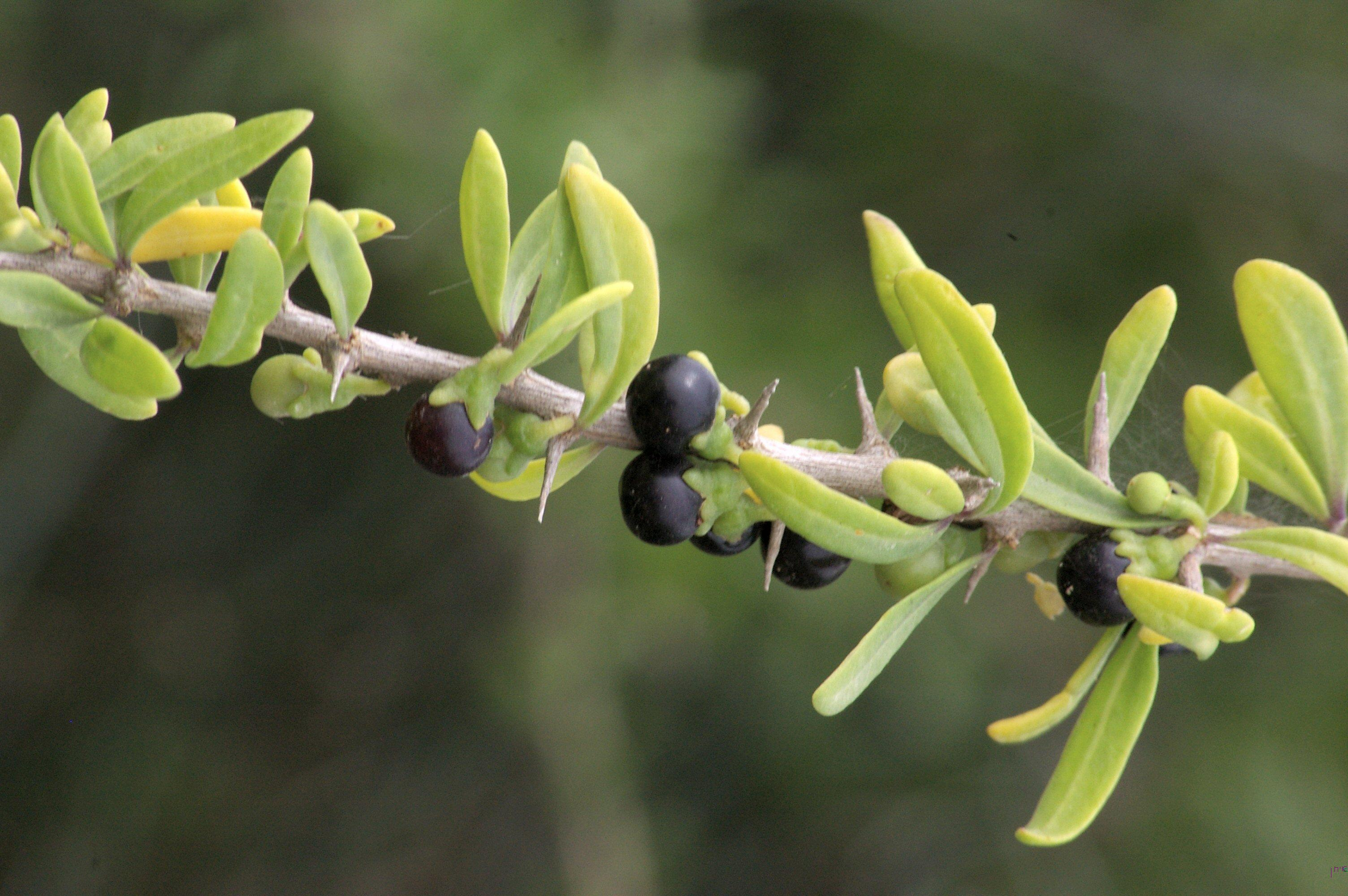
Lycium schweinfurthii

Some candidates for the gharqad tree.

== Hadiths that mention the Gharqad tree ==
=== Sahih Muslim ===
- 41:2922
- 41:6984
- 41:6985

=== Sunan ibn Majah ===
- 36:152.

== The Hadith within broader Sunni eschatology ==
The Sunni Hadith collections of Sahih al-Bukhari and Sahih Muslim give detailed accounts of a supernatural apocalyptic battle between Muslims and the forces of Dajjal.

The Dajjal was described by Muhammad as the Great deceiver who will come during the end of time, will claim to be Allah and Jesus, perform miracles that only a god would be able to perform such as resurrection and bringing rain upon demand and will seemingly unite people in peace. In addition, it is described that the Dajjal will have physical deficiencies such as having one eye, and upon the head of The Dajjal will be written the letters 'كفر' (meaning kfr or 'heretic' in Arabic) but only the believers will be able to read these letters, whilst others will not and thus be deceived by his claims of divinity.

According to one report, the Dajjal's army will be composed of 70,000 Jews from Isfahan, all armed, and 70,000 Tatars, as well as people from Khorasan (modern-day Afghanistan).

It is prophesied that before Judgement Day, a supernatural fire will shoot up from Hijaz that will illuminate much of the Middle East. The river Euphrates will part to reveal gold. But the biggest disaster will be when Gog and Magog are unleashed because the barrier built by Dhu al-Qarnayn will have ruptured. The Mahdi will lead a Muslim army against Dajjal and his followers in an apocalyptic battle known as al-Malhamat al-Kubra. After the Second Coming of Jesus, Jesus himself will kill the Dajjal.

== Sunni interpretation ==
Within Sunni Islam, these narrations are understood as part of Sunni eschatology's description of a great war at the end times against the forces of Dajjal which should occur after the second coming of Jesus according to Islam. Then, according to this eschatology, Jesus will lead an army of Muslims, some of whom are righteous Christians and righteous Jews converting to Islam in the eve of the battle, to fight the army of Dajjal consisting of Jews believing Dajjal is a god, and if a Jew of Dajjal's army hides behind a stone or a tree, this stone or tree will miraculously talk to Muslims to expose the Jew unless it is a Gharqad tree, because it is "their (the Jews') tree".

According to Sunni interpretation in Ashrat al-sa’a (“the signs of the hour”) by Yusuf al-Wabil, the Dajjal’s army will be made up of Jews, Persians, Turks, Bedouins, and women. Traditions from Bukhari’s and Ibn Maja’s hadith collections also include Persians, Turks, and Bedouins as well as Jews.

Sunni moderate writers debate the subject in eschatological terms, emphasizing that this should happen only in the end times after the second coming of Jesus in accordance with Sunni thought and should not damage current Islamic–Jewish relations.

Fayd al-Bari, a prominent Sunni commentary, explains that Jesus will only fight against those Jews who join the Dajjal's army, not all Jews around the world.

A comment by 8th century Islamic traditionalist Naim ibn Hammad states that after al-Mahdi recovers the Ark of the Covenant, most Jews will convert to Islam and join Muslims in the fight against Dajjal.

The general message of the text is often alleged as a prophecy, but it does not appear in the Quran, which Muslims believe is Allah's revelation to Muhammad.

According to Memri TV, Yasir Qadhi described this text as referring to an end times war which is "a fight between good and evil" and that the text is "predictive and not prescriptive".

== Other Islamic sects ==
Not all Muslims accept all hadiths as reliable and may conclude somewhat different eschatology; most Shia Muslims reject Sunni hadiths as unreliable and have their own hadiths, such as The Four Books. While according to Karimov, Zaydi Shia may hold Sunni hadiths with high esteem, Zaydis have their own primary hadith traditions. While some Ibadi Muslims do not consider Sunni hadiths as reliable and rely on Tartib al-Musnad, Hoffman noted that contemporary Ibadis often approve of the standard Sunni collections.

Dajani Daoudi concluded that by comprehensive review of the Quran, no such hadith would exist since it openly contradicts Islamic faith and that Muslims believe a hadith is the word of man while the Quran is the word of God. Daoudi added that "this hadith" (that which he quoted) was collected 150 years after the death of Muhammad, that the authenticity of such a hadith is disputed, and that this particular hadith has become controversial for promoting anti-Jewish sentiments among Muslims.

== Critical assessment ==
=== Insignificance of the tree in Judaism ===
Neither Nitraria nor Lycium have any sanctity in Judaism; they are not one of the four species of Sukkot, they are not one of the Seven Species of the Land of Israel and they are not one of the incense plants of the Torah; they are also not used for Havdalah and there is no Jewish tradition of eating their fruits in Tu BiShvat.

Furthermore, Lycium is mentioned in the Bible only once in a negative context in the Book of Judges, as Jotham compares his brother Avimelech, the self-proclaimed king of Shechem after he murdered his other brothers, to a Lycium, which is seen as a useless tree who can only cause harm.

=== Fundamentalism around the concept ===
Freyer Stowasser describes 19th and early 20th century views about apocalyptic hadiths of the sort introduced by Muhammad Abduh and the young, pre-Salafiist Rashid Rida:

The narratives on the Dajjal's end time reign and ultimate defeat were unreliable because of: questionable origin and transmitters, weak chains of hadith authentication, internal contradictions on this topic within the hadith corpus as a whole (that invalidate all of its parts), and the fact that these narratives contradict the Qur'anic text.

These modernist, deconstructionist approaches were unacceptable to Sunni clerical traditionalists. They have remained loyal to the more "literalist and inherited form" of apocalyptic hadiths, although they tend not to interpret them as calling for revolutionary political movements.

=== Conspiracy and the Grand Mufti ===
A few of the Sunni Islamists who strongly advocate for the destruction of the State of Israel have propagated a false allegation that Israeli Jews are planting millions of gharqad trees throughout Israel in preparation for a dire war. Grand Mufti of Jerusalem Muhammad Ahmad Hussein evoked the tree in a 2012 speech, saying that it was planted around all of the Israeli settlements. Johannes Gerloff stated that most Arab Muslims know what it is, and noted a growing number of articles online about it. However, Israeli nurseries and botanists are unaware of the identity of the "tree of the Jew".

=== Hamas ===
The gharqad tree is quoted in the 1988 founding charter of Hamas, Article 7, stating that every stone and tree—except for the gharqad tree—will speak aloud to reveal if a Jew is taking cover, so that the Muslim army can find and kill the Jew.

== See also ==
- Antisemitism in Islam
  - Uzair
- Islam and violence
