= Yousef Ahmed =

Yousef Ahmed (also Yousif, Youssef, Yusef, among others) may refer to:

- Yousef Ahmed (footballer, born 1988), Saudi Arabian-born Qatari footballer
- Yousef Ahmed (footballer, born 1994), Emirati footballer
- Yousef Ahmad, Qatari artist
- Yusuf Ahmed, Somali footballer

== See also ==
- Ahmed Yusuf (disambiguation)
