= Ahmed Youssif =

Egyptian strength and conditioning coach

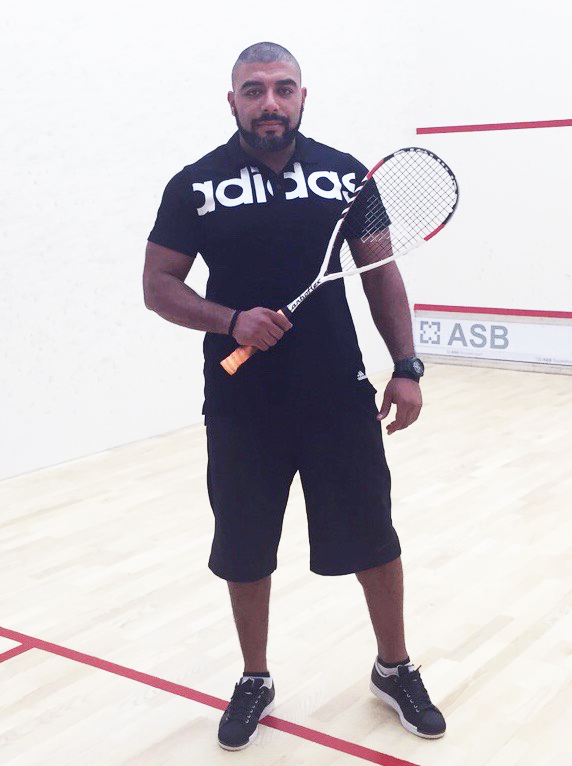
- Ahmed Youssif in 2015
- Born: Ahmed Youssif Ezzeldin Mohammed; 15 April 1982 (age 44); Cairo, Egypt
- Education: Helwan University
- Occupation: Strength and Conditioning Coach
- Years active: 1999–present

Ahmed Youssif (born 15 April 1982 in Cairo, Egypt) is a Strength and Conditioning Coach, who has worked with multiple athletes globally for fencing, squash, football, actors and models.

== Career ==
=== Squash ===
Ahmed Youssif started his career in Cairo, as a fitness coach for the young, pro squash player, Mohammed Abbas. He then worked with the once world ranking number 1 Ramy Ashour, the youngest reigning player to win the World Junior Squash Championships in 2004. Ahmed worked in India with former No.1 Ritwik Bhattacharya and 2016 world number 10 Joshna Chinappa

=== Football ===
In 1999, he became an official Strength and Conditioning Coach for the Egypt national football team (soccer) where he worked with players Mohamed Fadl, Hossam Hassan and Sayed Moawad whose team won their fifth title in the 2006 African Cup of Nations hosted in Egypt. This led to Ahmed working privately with Egyptian players internationally; Mido was on loan to Tottenham Hotspur where they worked together in London and Hany Said moved to Messina F.C. in Sicily, Italy.

Ahmed Youssif left Egypt and moved to Greece with Amir Azmy (Egyptian footballer), where he worked with PAOK FC as the official Strength and Conditioning Coach.

=== Actors and Models ===
Ahmed Youssif has worked with Indian model and actress Neha Dhupia and Canadian-born model Mia Uyeda. He also worked with Suraj Sharma in the Life of Pi (film) and Jon Hamm and Suraj Sharma in the Disney movie Million Dollar Arm.

=== Fencing ===
Ahmed worked with Egyptian fencing athletes Tamer Tahoun, Shaimaa El-Gammal and her sister Eman El Gammal for the Beijing Olympics 2008 and the Sydney Olympics in 2008.
