= Classical Islam =

The concept of classical Islam or a classical period in the history of Islam is largely a construct of non-Islamic scholarship, formed by analogy with the classical period of the Greco-Roman world. The term implies a positive judgement defining a "normative period" in Islamic history, but Western scholars generally extend the period much later than Muslim scholars would allow. The Muslim conception of a normative period corresponds mainly to that of the Companions of the Prophet and the Rightly Guided Caliphs, roughly the seventh century.

There is no consistency in Western usage. The term may be given a primarily religious sense, meaning "the era when the classics of Islamic law and spirituality were written", extending down to about 1400. Or it may take on a political sense, meaning "the major chain of political legitimacy" that came to end with the fall of Baghdad in 1258. Although "reality had failed to conform for rather more than four centuries" to the ideal of the caliphate, the collapse of 1258 represents a fundamental psychological break in Islamic history. In a more restricted sense, Islamic "classical civilization" corresponds to the "high caliphal" period of the Umayyads and Abbasids from about 692 to 945, when "Islamicate society formed a single vast state".

== Bibliography ==
- Grunebaum, Gustave E. von (1996) [1970]. Classical Islam: A History, 600–1258. Translated by Katherine Watson. Barnes & Noble. ISBN 978-0-7607-0210-9.
- Hillenbrand, Carole (2022). Classical Islam: Collected Essays. Edinburgh University Press. doi:10.1515/9781474486002. ISBN 978-1-4744-8600-2.
- Hodgson, Marshall G. S. (1974). The Venture of Islam: Conscience and History in a World Civilization. Vol. 1: The Classical Age of Islam. University of Chicago Press. ISBN 978-0-226-34678-6.
- Peters, F. E. (1994). A Reader on Classical Islam. Princeton University Press.
