= Ahmed Yousef (scientist) =

Ffood engineer, scientist and author

Ahmed Elmeleigy Yousef is a food engineer, scientist and author, currently the Virginia Hutchison Bazler and Frank E. Bazler Designated Professorship in Food Science at Ohio State University, and is also a published author.
