= Khaled Hroub =

Palestinian academic

Khaled Hroub (Arabic: خالد الحروب) is a Palestinian academic, a senior research fellow at the Centre of Islamic Studies and a former co-ordinator of the Cambridge Arab Media Project (CAMP) at the University of Cambridge. He is also professor of Middle Eastern studies at Northwestern University in Qatar.

== Selected works ==
English

- Ḥurūb, Khālid al- (2000). Hamas: Political Thought and Practice. Institute for Palestine Studies.
- Ḥurūb, Khālid al- (2006). Hamas: A Beginner's Guide. Pluto Press. (Third edition, 2025. ISBN 978-0-7453-5087-5)
- Ḥurūb, Khālid al- (ed.) (2010). Political Islam: Context versus Ideology. Saqi Books.
- Ḥurūb, Khālid al- (ed.) (2012). Religious Broadcasting in the Middle East.
- Ḥurūb, Khālid al- (ed.). (2025) Islamists and the Arab Revolutions.

Arabic

- Fragility of Ideology and Might of Politics (2010)
- In Praise of Revolution (2012)
- Tattoo of Cities (literary collection, 2008)
- Enchantress of Poetry (poetry collection, 2008)
