= Ahmed Yousef =

Palestinian politician

Ahmed Yousef is a Palestinian politician and author who was a senior adviser to Gaza's Prime Minister Ismail Haniyeh and remains close to current Hamas leadership. Beginning in 1968, Ahmed Yousef was the pupil of the founder of Hamas, Sheikh Ahmed Yassin. Yousef previously served as the Executive Director of the United Association for Studies and Research, a U.S.-based non-profit organization that has been called a front operation for Hamas. He also served as editor of UASR’s quarterly journal The Middle East Affairs Journal. Yousef returned to Gaza in 2005 following the withdrawal of the Israeli army and the victory of Hamas in the legislative elections. In 2006 he was appointed as the political advisor to then-Prime Minister Ismail Haniyeh. He is now the head of the House of Wisdom Institution for Conflict Resolution and Governance in Gaza.

On March 19, 2025, it was reported that Yousef's son-in-law, Badar Khan Suri, was detained by U.S. Immigration and Customs Enforcement. Suri is an Indian national on a student visa as a postdoctoral fellow at Georgetown University. US Department of Homeland Security spokesperson Tricia McLaughlin said that Suri was "spreading Hamas propaganda and promoting antisemitism on social media."

== Positions ==
Ahmed Yousef has been described as "Hamas's gate" to the West because of his extensive connections to Hamas and his years living in the United States.

Yousef has been a member of the Muslim Brotherhood for 45 years in addition to his positions within Hamas.

As a senior advisor to Ismail Haniyeh, Yousef frequently spoke to media outlets about the Israeli–Palestinian conflict, and about the position of Arabs and Muslims in the United States.

Yousef is frequently quotes as saying that Hamas has not carried out suicide bombing attacks since 2004 because the use of indiscriminate killing was harming the group's movement.

Yousef has also spoken out critically against the Palestinian Authority government and their lack of control in Gaza. In a December 2014 statement, he criticized the PA's lack of governance in Gaza and praised Qatari support of Gazans as a direct result of this lack of governance. Yousef has also frequently highlighted the close relationship between Hamas and Qatar over the course of several decades.

In the past several years, Yousef has called for an end to the armed resistance in order for the Palestinians to have time to reconstruct. He says that an officials truce will allow for others to engage in the reconstruction of Gaza.

As recently as December 2015, he has spoken out against "barbaric" tactics used by al Qaeda and ISIS, especially those such as the murder of women and children.

In July 2024 Saleh was critical of Hamas' rationale for the October 7 attacks questioning if "studied and thought of the consequences" before launching it as it resulted in the Israeli invasion of Gaza.

== House of Wisdom for Conflict Resolution & Governance ==
The House Of Wisdom For Conflict Resolution & Governance (HOW) is a think-tank that was created in May 2008. Yousef is the Secretary-General of HOW. He says HOW is playing a role in and sponsoring the Palestinian reconciliation process between Hamas and the Palestinian Authority.

HOW officials have testified on the Gaza–Israel conflict before the Foreign Relations Committee of the UK Parliament as well as having sponsored various delegations, conferences, seminars, and workshops. In February 2013, HOW received a Parliamentary delegation from the UK consisting of 11 parliamentarians and headed by MP Philipe Hollobone and Dr Ibrahim Hewitt, the head of Interpal, a UK charity that although designated in 2003 by the US as a terrorist organization that funds Hamas, operates legally within the United Kingdom

Speaking as a HOW leader, Youssef has said that the Gaza Strip smuggling tunnels "are our technology, our only weapon of war, no different from tanks or drones" and that Hamas is a "Muslim Brotherhood group" with "moderate ideology and principles".

== Publications ==
Ahmed Yousef has published multiple books, including The End of the Jewish State: Just a Matter of Time and a tribute to Hamas founder and Leader Ahmed Yassin called Ahmed Yassin: The Phenomenon, the Miracle, and the Legend of the Challenge. This tribute was published through UASR. It contained letters praising the imminent victory of Hamas over the Jews. He also published American Muslims: A Community Under Siege around the third anniversary of the September 11 terrorist attacks.

In a 1989 pamphlet published by UASR and written by Yousef called Hamas: Background of Its Inception and Horizons of Its March, Yousef described Hamas as being the only solution to the Israeli-Palestinian conflict.

Yousef has also written articles for The New York Times, and The Guardian.

== Bibliography ==
- Hamas: Background of Its Inception and Horizons of Its March. Springfield, VA. UASR. 1989.
- American Muslims: A Community Under Siege. Springfield, VA: UASR Publishing Group, 2004.
- Yousef, Ahmed (1 November 2006). "Pause for Peace". The New York Times.
- Yousef, Ahmed (2007-6-20). "What Hamas Wants". The New York Times.
- Yousef, Ahmed (2009-07-01). "I Welcome the Franco-Egyptian Initiative". The Guardian.
- Yousef, Ahmed (2014-11-14). "Judge Hamas on the Measures it Takes for its People". The Guardian.
