= Jane Gerber =

American historian and academic

Jane S. Gerber
- Born: 1938 (age 87–88); Brooklyn, New York
- Education: Wellesley College (BA); Harvard University (MA); Columbia University (PhD)
- Occupations: Historian, Researcher, and Professor

Jane S. Gerber (born 1938) is a professor of Jewish history and director of the Institute for Sephardic Studies at the City University of New York.

== Life and education ==
Gerber, née Jane Satlow was born in 1938 to Israeli mother Elise Kliegman and father David Satlow. Growing up in an observant family, she and her two sisters attended The Center Academy at the Brooklyn Jewish Center. In 1955, she finished high school and enrolled at Wellesley College studying the works of French novelist, Marcel Proust.

After receiving her undergraduate education, she continued on at Harvard University where she began to study the relationship between Jewish and Islamic history. She met her future husband, Roger A. Gerber, at Harvard. She and Gerber moved to New York and married in 1965. In New York, Gerber continued her work on Jewish-Islamic History at Columbia University and earned her Ph.D. on the interactions between the local population of Fez, Morocco, and the recently immigrated Megorashim.

Gerber has three daughters.

== Academic career ==
Gerber teaches classes in Classics, History, and Masters level Liberal Studies in the Center for Jewish Studies at the City University of New York, specializing in Sephardic history. She is director of the Institute for Sephardic Studies.

Gerber's books include Jews of Spain: A History of the Sephardic Experience and Jewish Society in Fez. Gerber served as president of the Association for Jewish Studies from 1981 to 1983.

== Works ==
- Berger, David, ed. (1986). "Anti-Semitism and the Muslim World". History and Hate: The Dimensions of Anti-Semitism. The Jewish Publication Society. ISBN 0-8276-0636-2.
- The Jews of Spain: A History of Sephardic Experience. Free Press. 1992. ISBN 978-0029115732.
- De Lange, Nicholas, ed. (1997). "My Heart is in the East". The Illustrated History of the Jewish people. Harcourt Brace. ISBN 978-0151003020.
- (1997) Jewish Society in Fez, 1450-1700: Studies in Communal and Economic Life (Studies in Judaism in Modern Times) ISBN 9004058206

Her one-volume history of Sephardic Jews of Spain was described as "excellent" and a reviewer noted her strengths in synthesizing much recent research about this people.

== Awards ==
- 1993: National Jewish Book Award in the Sephardic Studies category for Jews of Spain: A History of the Sephardic Experience
