= Halim Rane =

Australian Islamic studies scholar

Halim Rane is an Australian academic and associate professor at Griffith University who specializes in Islamic Studies. In 2015 he was named "Australian University Teacher of the Year" by the Australian Department of Education and Training.

Rane has a master's degree in media studies and a bachelor's degree in sociology from the International Islamic University Malaysia, and received his PhD in international relations from Griffith University. He is the author or co-author of several books including Islam and the Australian News Media (Melbourne University Press), Reconstructing Jihad Amid Competing International Norms (Palgrave Macmillan), and Media Framing of the Muslim World (Palgrave Macmillan).
