= History of Bosnia and Herzegovina (1941–1945) =

After the Kingdom of Yugoslavia was invaded by the Axis powers during World War II, all of Bosnia was ceded to the newly created Independent State of Croatia. Axis rule in Bosnia led to widespread persecution and mass-killings of native undesirables and anti-fascists. Many Serbs themselves took up arms and joined the Partisans and Chetniks, a Serb nationalist and royalist resistance movement that conducted ineffective guerrilla warfare against the occupying Nazi forces. On 12 October 1941 a group of 108 notable Muslim citizens of Sarajevo signed the Resolution of Sarajevo Muslims by which they condemned the persecution of Serbs organized by Ustaše, made distinction between Muslims who participated in such persecutions and whole Muslim population, presented information about the persecutions of Muslims by Serbs and requested security for all citizens of the country, regardless of their identity.

...was a letter sent to Adolf Hitler in the autumn of 1942 by prominent Bosniaks, including the then mayor of Sarajevo, Mustafa Softić, translated and published in Vladimir Dedijer's book "Genocide against Muslims 1942-1945." In a letter or memorandum A brief history of Bosnia and Bosniaks is presented. During the 6th century, during the reign of Theodoric, king of the Eastern Goths, to whose state Illyria then belonged, the old Roman name Bosnia was changed, in the old dialect "Bosen" which meant good man, it is stated in the memorandum that the Slavs came to the area in the 6th century under the name of Serbs and Croats ".https://www.dw.com/bs/pisma-bo%C5%A1njaka-hitleru/a-45940938

Bosnia was the geographical mother of the partisan movement, providing ample space amongst its mountains for training and development.

— Basil Davidson

Starting in 1941, Yugoslav communists under the leadership of Josip Broz Tito organized their own multi-ethnic resistance group, the partisans, who fought against both Axis and Chetnik forces. On 29 November 1943 the Anti-Fascist Council of National Liberation of Yugoslavia with Tito at its helm held a founding conference in Jajce where Bosnia and Herzegovina was reestablished as a republic within the Yugoslavian federation in its Ottoman borders. Military success eventually prompted the Allies to support the Partisans, and the end of the war resulted in the establishment of the Socialist Federal Republic of Yugoslavia, with the constitution of 1946 officially making Bosnia and Herzegovina one of six constituent republics in the new state. According to Hoare, by late 1943, 70% of the Partisans in Bosnia and Herzegovina were Serb and 30% were Croat and Muslim. At the end of 1977, Bosnian recipients of war pensions were 64.1% Serb, 23% Muslim, and 8.8% Croat.

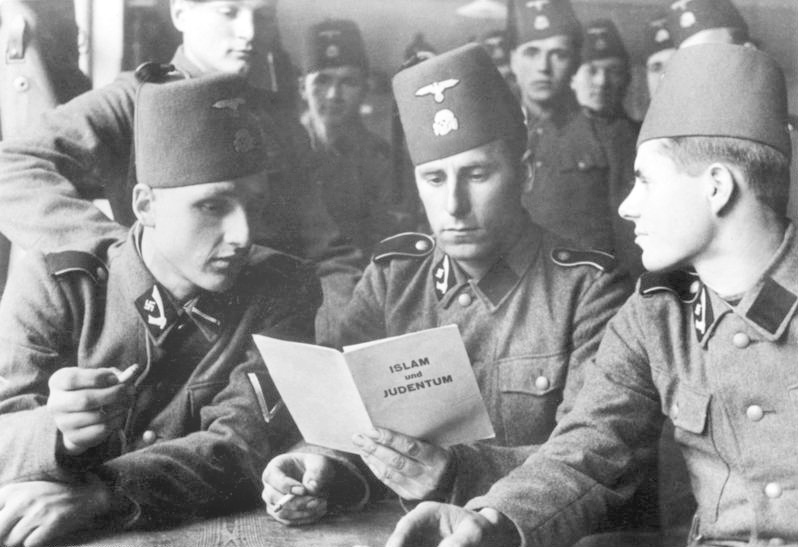
Bosnian Muslim soldiers of the SS "Handschar" reading a Nazi propaganda book, Islam und Judentum, in Nazi-occupied Southern France (Bundesarchiv, 21 June 1943)

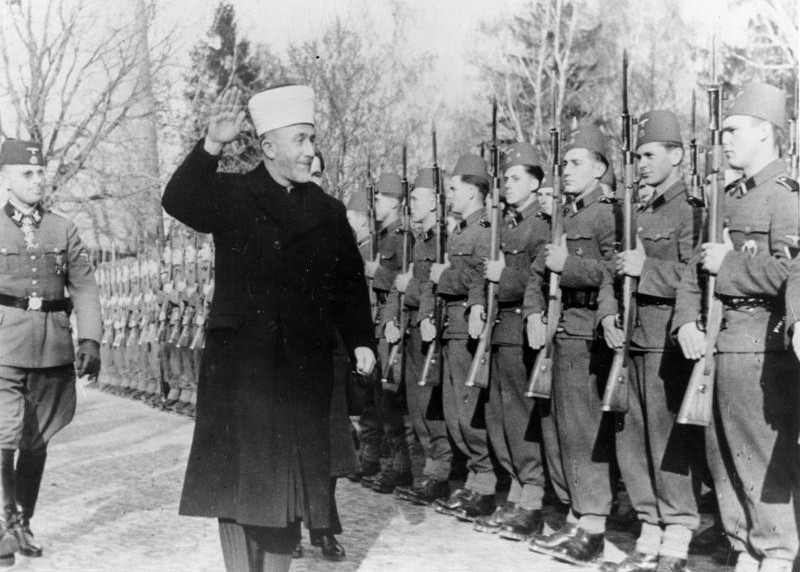
November 1943: Amin al-Husseini greeting Bosnian Muslim Waffen-SS volunteers with a Nazi salute. At right is SS General Karl-Gustav Sauberzweig.

During the war, and following the massive deterioration of internal security under the incompetent Ustaše regime, the Nazis created a quisling Waffen-SS unit in Bosnia called the 13th Waffen Mountain Division of the SS Handschar (1st Croatian) in February 1943. Imam Halim Malkoć was the only Muslim to earn the German Iron Cross during World War II.

== See also ==
- Croatisation
- Drvar uprising

== Literature ==
- Munoz, Antonio J., editor., The East Came West: Muslim, Hindu and Buddhist Volunteers in the German Armed Forces. (chapters 2 and 13) Bayside, NY: Axis Europa, 2001 ISBN 1-891227-39-4
- Hermann Neubacher: Sonderauftrag Suedost 1940-1945, Bericht eines fliegendes Diplomaten, 2. durchgesehene Auflage, Goettingen 1956
- Ladislaus Hory and Martin Broszat: Der Kroatische Ustascha-Staat, 1941-1945 Stuttgart, 1964
- Redzic, Enver, Muslimansko Autonomastvo I 13. SS Divizija. (Sarajevo: Svjetlost, 1987).
- Bataković, Dušan T. (1996). The Serbs of Bosnia & Herzegovina: History and Politics. Dialogue Association. ISBN 9782911527104.
- Hoare, Marko Attila (2006). Genocide and Resistance in Hitler's Bosnia: The Partisans and the Chetniks. Oxford University Press. ISBN 978-0-19-726380-8.
