= Operation Hackfleisch =

Nazi offensive in Bosnia (1944)

Date	Late July – August 1944
Location	Eastern Bosnia
Result	Axis tactical victory

Belligerents
Nazi Germany; Independent State of Croatia	Yugoslav Partisans

Units involved
13th SS Handschar Division; SS-Waffen-Gebirgsjäger-Regiment 28; SS-Waffen-Gebirgsjäger-Regiment 27; 7th SS Division Prinz Eugen; SS-Aufklärungs-Abteilung 7 (SS-Aufkl. Abt. 7); Elements of the 13th SS Mountain Infantry Regiment (SS-Gebirgsjäger-Regiment 13); 808. Sicherungs-Bataillon (808th Security Battalion)	3rd Corps; 38th East Bosnia Division; 17th Majevica Brigade; 18th East Bosnia Brigade; 19th Birač Brigade; 27th East Bosnia Division; 16th Muslim Brigade; 20th Romanija Brigade; 12th Corps; 11th Krajina Division; 11th Border Division

Operation Hackfleisch was an anti-Partisan offensive launched in eastern Bosnia on August 3, 1944. Led by the 7th SS Mountain Division "Prinz Eugen" and the 13th SS Mountain Division "Handschar", its goal was to destroy or tie down the 12th Corps of the Yugoslav Partisans to prevent them from crossing the Drina River.

== Background ==
By summer 1944 Tito's Partisans in Bosnia were preparing offensives toward Serbia and Montenegro. German Group Army “F” (commanded by Field Marshal von Weichs) countered with anti-Partisan sweeps. Operation Hackfleisch was linked to Operation Rübezahl, a prior offensive securing Srebrenica, so Partisans could not cross the Drina. Hackfleisch (“Mincemeat”) objective was to destroy the Yugoslav Partisan forces operating between Kladanj, Olovo, Vlasenica and Sokolac before they could continue their advance toward Serbia.

The target zone was the mountainous triangle Kladanj–Vlasenica–Sokolac–Olovo in the eastern Bosnian highlands, as the partisans were active there (12th and 6th Corps), with supply lines toward Foča, Višegrad and beyond. The columns were allocated tasks and composed as follows:

- the reconnaissance battalion of the 7th SS Division was to drive west from Vareš and attack the Partisans around the town of Olovo, pushing them east;
- I/28 from the 13th SS Division was to attack south and south-east from Ribnica towards Olovo;
- III/28 from the 13th SS Division was to thrust south and south-east from Kladanj towards the village of Petrović;
- The 27th Regiment of the 13th SS Division was to drive southwards from Šekovići;
- parts of the 14th Regiment of the 7th SS Division were to push north-west between Olovo and Sokolac; and
- parts of the 13th Regiment of the 7th SS Division were to attack northwards through Sokolac.

== Operation ==
Operation Hackfleisch commenced on 4 August 1944 as the Bosnian phase of the larger German offensive Operation Rübezahl. The operation was intended to prevent the advance of the Yugoslav Partisans into Serbia by destroying their forces operating in the area between Kladanj, Olovo, Vlasenica and Sokolac. The German operational plan called for a converging attack from several directions in order to encircle the Partisan formations east of Olovo. The 7th SS Reconnaissance Battalion advanced from Vareš toward Olovo, driving Partisan units toward the advancing columns of Handschar and Prinz Eugen. Simultaneously, the I Battalion of the 28th SS Mountain Regiment attacked from Ribnica toward Olovo, the III Battalion of the 28th Regiment advanced south from the Kladanj area toward Petrović, and the 27th SS Mountain Regiment attacked south from the Šekovići sector. At the same time, elements of the 13th and 14th SS Mountain Regiments of Prinz Eugen advanced from the Sokolac area in an attempt to close the encirclement.

The offensive achieved initial success. German forces scattered Partisan units around Olovo, captured the dominant heights southwest of the town after heavy fighting, and linked up on 6 August. The I Battalion of the 28th Regiment captured Čuništa before continuing its advance toward Olovo, while the III Battalion advanced according to plan from the Kladanj sector. The operation encountered its strongest resistance around Šekovići and Vlasenica, where the 27th SS Mountain Regiment became engaged in fierce fighting against the Partisan 27th and 38th East Bosnia Divisions. Unable to advance, the regiment failed to seal the eastern flank of the encirclement. This allowed the main Partisan forces to cross the Vlasenica–Han Pijesak road and escape eastward, while other formations withdrew toward Goražde. Although the offensive temporarily disrupted the planned Partisan advance into Serbia, it failed to destroy the opposing forces.

Following the main offensive, German units carried out a series of clearing operations across eastern and northeastern Bosnia. On 9 August, the 27th SS Mountain Regiment conducted operations around Šekovići, while the I and III Battalions of the 28th Regiment were placed under the command of Prinz Eugen to continue pursuit operations into central Bosnia. Further operations followed around Puračić, the Konjuh region, Osmaci and Matkovac as German forces attempted to drive remaining Partisan formations from the area. Between 21 and 26 August, elements of the 27th SS Mountain Regiment were redeployed to the Bratunac area to counter the Partisan 27th East Bosnia Division. After several days of fighting, German troops dispersed the division and forced its remaining elements to retreat south into the Podžeplje region. Smaller hunter detachments (Jagdkommandos) continued pursuing scattered Partisan groups while the main force resumed security duties. Combat continued until the end of August, culminating in heavy fighting around Debelo Brdo on 30 and 31 August. After an eighteen-hour battle supported by heavy weapons, German troops captured the position and forced the remaining Partisan defenders to withdraw. Despite several tactical successes during the month-long offensive, Operation Hackfleisch failed to achieve its principal objective.

== Aftermath ==
Although German forces succeeded in launching coordinated attacks across eastern Bosnia and temporarily disrupted the Yugoslav Partisan advance, Operation Hackfleisch failed to achieve its principal operational objective. Heavy fighting, particularly involving the 27th Regiment of the Handschar Division against the 27th East Bosnia Division and the 38th Bosnia Division, prevented the German encirclement from closing. The Partisan forces escaped through gaps in the German lines, crossing the Vlasenica-Han Pijesak road and withdrawing toward Gorazde and southeastern Bosnia. German reports described the operation as a limited tactical success, claiming approximately 227 Partisans killed and more than 50 prisoners captured. However, these local gains failed to produce the intended strategic result.
