= 13th Waffen Mountain Division of the SS Handschar (1st Croatian) =

German mountain division of World War II

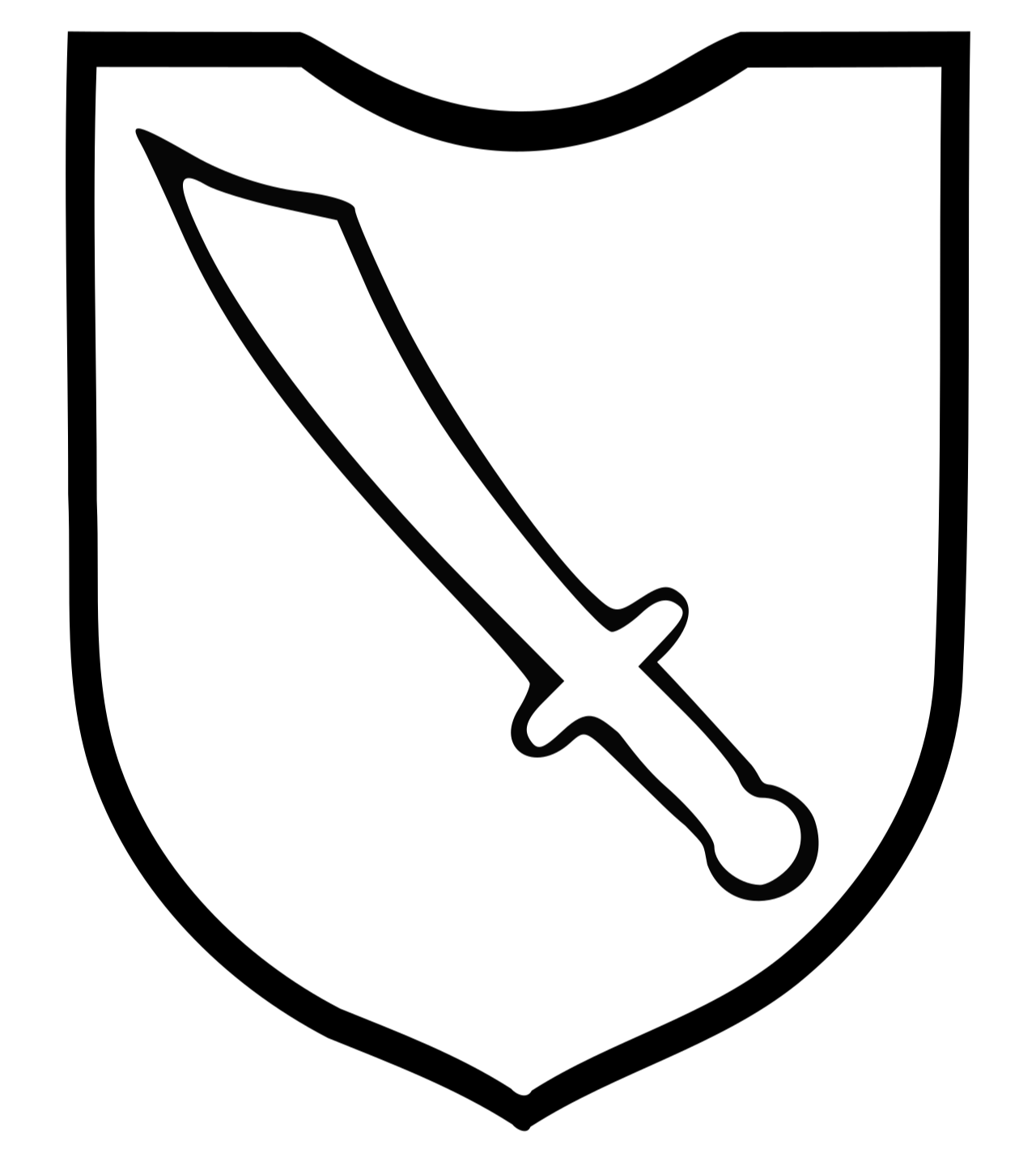
- Divisional vehicle symbol
- Active: 1943–1945
- Allegiance: Nazi Germany; Independent State of Croatia
- Branch: Waffen-SS
- Type: Gebirgsjäger (Mountain infantry)
- Role: Anti-partisan operations
- Size: Division (maximum of 17,000)
- Part of: V SS Mountain Corps; IX Waffen Mountain Corps of the SS (Croatian); LXVIII Army Corps
- Nickname: Handschar
- Engagements: World War II; World War II in Yugoslavia; Operation Wegweiser; Operation Save; Operation Osterei; Operation Maibaum; Operation Maiglöckchen; Operation Vollmond; Operation Heiderose; Operation Hackfleisch; Eastern Front; Operation Frühlingserwachen

Commanders
- Notable commanders: Karl-Gustav Sauberzweig; Desiderius Hampel

The 13th Waffen Mountain Division of the SS Handschar (1st Croatian) was a mountain infantry division of the Waffen-SS, an armed branch of the German Nazi Party that served alongside but was never formally part of the Wehrmacht during World War II. At the post-war Nuremberg trials, the Waffen-SS was declared to be a criminal organisation due to its major involvement in war crimes and crimes against humanity. From March to December 1944, the division fought a counter-insurgency campaign against communist-led Yugoslav Partisan resistance forces in the Independent State of Croatia, a fascist puppet state of Germany that encompassed almost all of modern-day Croatia, all of modern-day Bosnia and Herzegovina, and parts of modern-day Serbia.

The division was named Handschar (Bosnian: handžar), after a local fighting knife or scimitar carried by Ottoman policemen during the centuries that the region was part of the Ottoman Empire. It was the first non-Germanic Waffen-SS division, and its formation marked the expansion of the Waffen-SS into a multi-ethnic military force. Composed mainly of Bosnian Muslims with some Catholic Croats, and mostly German and Yugoslav Volksdeutsche officers and non-commissioned officers, the members of the division took an oath of allegiance to the German Führer Adolf Hitler and the Croatian Poglavnik Ante Pavelić.

The division fought briefly in the Syrmia region north of the Sava river before crossing into northeastern Bosnia. After crossing the Sava, it established a designated "security zone" in northeastern Bosnia between the Sava, Bosna, Drina, and Spreča rivers. It also fought outside the security zone on several occasions, and earned a reputation for brutality and savagery, not only during combat operations but also for atrocities committed against Serb and Jewish civilians. In late 1944, parts of the division were transferred briefly to the Zagreb area, and non-German members began to desert in large numbers. Over the winter of 1944–45, the unit was sent to the Baranja region, where it fought against the Red Army and Bulgarians throughout southern Hungary, falling back via a series of defensive lines until they were inside the Reich frontier.

Most of the remaining Bosnian Muslims left at this point and attempted to return to Bosnia. The rest retreated further west, hoping to surrender to the Western Allies. Most of the remaining members became prisoners of the British Army. Subsequently, 38 officers were extradited to Yugoslavia to face criminal charges, and ten were executed. Hundreds of former members of the division fought in the 1947–48 civil war in Mandatory Palestine and the 1948 Arab–Israeli War.

== Background ==
=== NDH and Ante Pavelić ===
After the invasion of the Kingdom of Yugoslavia by the Axis powers on 6 April 1941, the extreme Croat nationalist and fascist Ante Pavelić, who had been in exile in Benito Mussolini's Italy, was appointed Poglavnik (leader) of an Ustaše-led Croatian state – the Independent State of Croatia (often called the NDH, from the Croatian: Nezavisna Država Hrvatska). The NDH combined almost all of modern-day Croatia, all of modern-day Bosnia and Herzegovina and parts of modern-day Serbia into an "Italian-German quasi-protectorate". NDH authorities, led by the Ustaše Militia, subsequently implemented genocidal policies against the Serb, Jewish and Roma population living within the borders of the new state.

To secure the loyalty of the Bosnian Muslims, Pavelić ordered that property in Zagreb be converted into a mosque that he named the "Poglavnik's Mosque". Despite Pavelić's assurances of equality with the Croats, many Muslims quickly became dissatisfied with Croatian rule. A Muslim leader reported that not one Muslim occupied an influential post in the administration. Although this was an overstatement, Muslims were underrepresented in government positions, with only two of 20 ministerial positions. None of the six state secretaries were Muslim, and there were only 13 Muslim "people representatives" in a total of 206. Fierce fighting broke out between the Ustaše, the Serb-chauvinist Chetniks and pan-Yugoslav Partisans in NDH territory. Some Ustaše militia units became convinced that the Muslims were communist sympathisers, and burned their villages and murdered many civilians. The Chetniks accused the Muslims of taking part in the Ustaše violence against Serbs and perpetrated similar atrocities against the Muslim population. The Muslims received little protection from the Croatian Home Guard, the regular army of the NDH, whom the Germans described as "of minimal combat value". Local militias were raised, but these were also of limited value and only one, the Tuzla-based Home Guard Hadžiefendić Legion, led by Muhamed Hadžiefendić, was of any significance.

=== Denunciations and request for protection ===
The Bosnian Muslim elite and notables in various cities and towns issued resolutions or memoranda to the NDH and German authorities that publicly denounced the genocide of the Serbs and the NDH laws targeting them. These were issued in: Prijedor (23 September 1941), Sarajevo (12 October), Mostar (21 October), Banja Luka (12 November), Bijeljina (2 December) and Tuzla (11 December). The resolutions condemned the Ustaše in Bosnia and Herzegovina, both for their mistreatment of Muslims and for their attempts to turn Muslims and Serbs against one another. One memorandum declared that since the beginning of the Ustaše regime, the Muslims had dreaded the lawless activities that the Ustaše, Croatian government authorities and various illegal groups had been perpetrating against the Serbs.

The Bosnian Muslims' dissatisfaction with the Ustaše rule of the NDH and their need for protection were combined with nostalgia for the period of Habsburg rule in Bosnia and a generally friendly attitude towards Germany among prominent Bosnian Muslims. These factors led to a push towards autonomy for the Bosnian Muslim community which was strongly opposed by Pavelić as counter to the territorial integrity of the NDH. By November 1942, the autonomists were desperate to protect the Muslim people and wrote to Adolf Hitler asking that he authorise the creation of an autonomous "political-administrative authority" in Bosnia within the structure of the NDH, led by a Hitler appointee.

== Origin ==
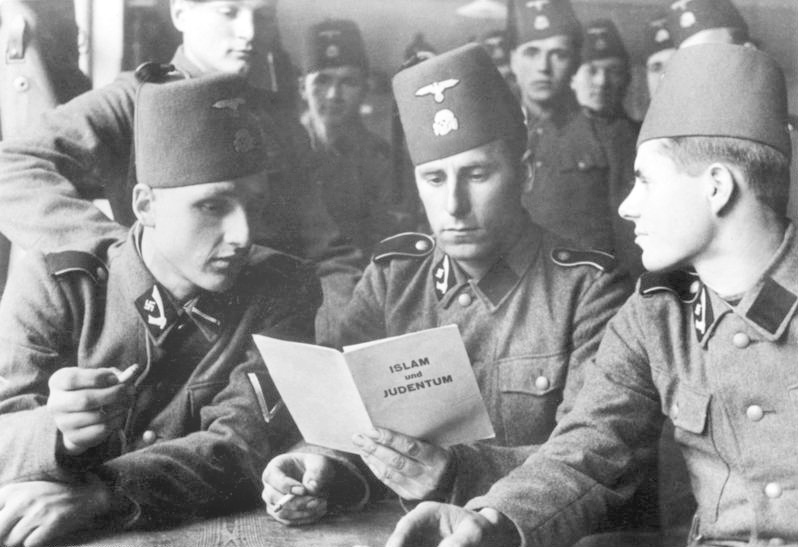
Soldiers of the 13th SS Division with a brochure about "Islam and Judaism", 1943

On 6 December 1942, Reichsführer-SS Heinrich Himmler and key Waffen-SS recruiting officer SS-Obergruppenführer und General der Waffen-SS (Note: Equivalent to a U.S. Army lieutenant general) Gottlob Berger approached Hitler with the proposal to raise a Bosnian Muslim SS division. Both the Wehrmacht and the Waffen-SS were concerned about the rapidly deteriorating security situation in the NDH that tied down German military personnel needed elsewhere. A German source noted that by 1943 over 100,000 Bosnian Muslims had been killed and 250,000 had become refugees. In addition, a serious food shortage threatened the region. "The Muslims," remarked SS-Gruppenführer und Generalleutnant der Waffen-SS (Note: Equivalent to a U.S. Army major general) Artur Phleps, "bear the special status of being persecuted by all others".

The romantic notions that Himmler had about the Bosnian Muslims were probably significant in the division's genesis. Nonetheless, a memorandum dated 1 November 1942 also indicates that leading Muslim autonomists had already suggested the creation of a volunteer Waffen-SS unit under German command. Himmler was personally fascinated by the Islamic faith and believed that Islam created fearless soldiers. He found their ferocity preferable to the gentility of Christians and believed their martial qualities should be further developed and put to use. He thought that Muslim men would make perfect SS soldiers as Islam "promises them Heaven if they fight and are killed in action." As for their ethnic background and SS requirements, it appears that Himmler accepted the theories advanced by both Croatian and German nationalists that the Croatian people, including the Muslims, were not ethnic Slavs but pure Aryans of either Gothic or Iranian descent.

Himmler was inspired by the noted successes of the Bosnian-Herzegovinian Infantry in World War I. He "endeavoured to restore what he called 'an old Austrian' tradition by reviving the Bosnian regiments of the former Austro-Hungarian Army in the form of a Bosnian Muslim SS Division". Once raised, the division was to engage and destroy Josip Broz Tito's Partisan forces operating in north-eastern Bosnia, thus restoring local "order". Himmler's primary concern in the region was not the security of the local Muslim population, but the welfare of ethnic German settlers to the north in Syrmia. "Srem (Syrmia) is the breadbasket of Croatia, and hopefully it and our beloved German settlements will be secured. I hope that the area south of Srem will be liberated by ... the Bosnian division ... so that we can at least restore partial order in this ridiculous (Croatian) state."

Hitler formally approved the project in mid-February 1943 and Himmler put Phleps, commander of the 7th SS Volunteer Mountain Division Prinz Eugen, in charge of raising the first SS division to be recruited from a non-Germanic people.

== Recruitment ==
On 18 February 1943, Phleps travelled to Zagreb to begin formal negotiations with the NDH government. He met with German foreign ministry envoy Siegfried Kasche and NDH Foreign Minister Dr. Mladen Lorković who represented Pavelić. Pavelić had already agreed to raise the division, but the Waffen-SS and NDH governments had very different ideas of how it would be recruited and controlled. Lorković suggested that it be named the SS Ustaša Division, a Croatian unit raised with SS assistance, with familiar geographically based regimental names such as Bosna, Krajina and Una. This reflected the concerns shared by Pavelić and Kasche that an exclusively Muslim division might aid a Muslim bid for independence. As a compromise, the word "Croatian" was included in its official title and Catholic Croatian officers were recruited. Himmler and Phleps largely prevailed and created the division as they saw fit, leaving the NDH very unhappy with the outcome, particularly regarding its ethnic composition.

SS-Standartenführer (Note: Equivalent to a U.S. Army colonel) Karl von Krempler, a specialist in Islam who spoke Serbo-Croatian, was charged by Himmler and Phleps with organising the division. On 3 March 1943, Phleps met with von Krempler, who was to work with NDH government representative Alija Šuljak. The campaign began on 20 March 1943, when von Krempler and Šuljak began an 18-day recruiting tour through 11 Bosnian districts. With assistance from the SS, recruiting rallies were held in the towns of Živinice and Gračanica. In the meantime the Germans began raising the divisional headquarters staff in Berlin, including SS-Standartenführer der Reserve Herbert von Oberwurzer, who was transferred from the 6th SS Mountain Division Nord to command the division. Outside the NDH, recruiting was conducted in the southern parts of the German-occupied territory of Serbia that had significant Muslim populations, namely the Sandžak region along the border with the Italian governorate of Montenegro, and the parts of the Kosovo region occupied by Germany. Despite high German expectations and considerable efforts from local collaborators, recruitment from these areas was low. Due to the low number of recruits, to raise an Albanian SS regiment the Germans mobilized the population of Novi Pazar in the Kosovo region on 10 April and 30 May. Eligible males who did not volunteer were rounded up by the Albanian gendarmerie to serve in the regiment. Some Muslims escaped serving in the regiment by fleeing the city.

Šuljak and von Krempler soon fell out over the aims and purposes of the proposed division. Šuljak, an entirely political appointee, criticised von Krempler's Serbian dialect and his use of traditional Islamic colours and emblems (green flags and crescent moons) during the recruitment drive rather than the Ustaše symbols. When he reached Tuzla in central Bosnia, von Krempler met with the militia leader Hadžiefendić. On 28 March, Hadžiefendić escorted von Krempler to Sarajevo, where he introduced him to the leader of Bosnia's Islamic clergy, Hafiz Muhamed Pandža, the reis-ul-ulema, as well as other leading Muslim politicians not involved with the Ustaše. The NDH government and Kasche were furious, demanding von Krempler's immediate removal. The SS ignored the demand and von Krempler continued recruiting, including deserters from the NDH armed forces.

=== Mufti of Jerusalem ===
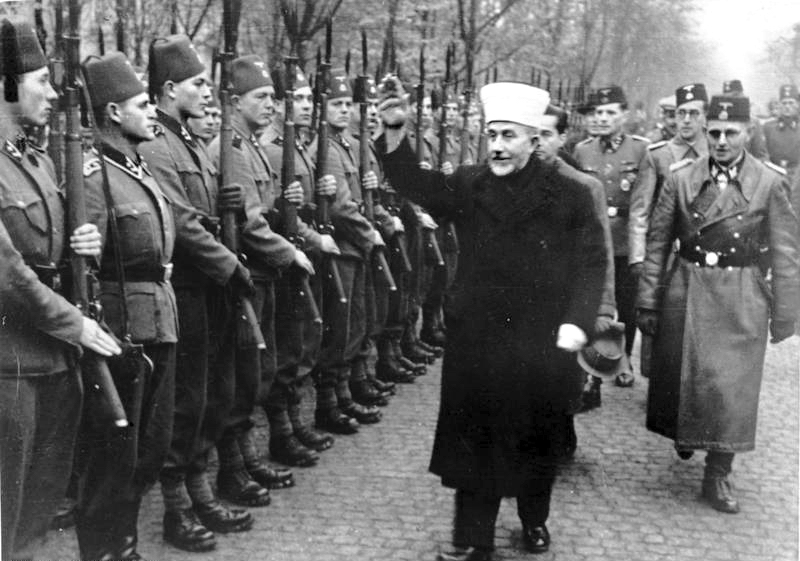
Haj Amin al-Husseini, alongside SS-Brigadeführer und Generalmajor der Waffen SS Karl-Gustav Sauberzweig, reviewing Bosnian SS volunteers during their training in November 1943

In March–April 1943, both Himmler and a group of Muslim leaders within the NDH requested that the Mufti of Jerusalem, Haj Amin al-Husseini, then resident in Berlin, assist in organising and recruiting Muslims into the Waffen-SS and other units. He was escorted by Krempler, who spoke Turkish. From 30 March to 10 April, the Mufti visited Zagreb, Sarajevo and Banja Luka to meet senior Muslim leaders and agitate in support of the new division. The Mufti also blessed and inspected the division, during which he used the Nazi salute. The Mufti insisted, "The most important task of this division must be to protect the homeland and families [of the Bosnian volunteers]; the division must not be permitted to leave Bosnia", but the Germans paid no attention.

=== Catholic Croat recruitment ===
Despite the support of al-Husseini, recruitment of Muslims for the division fell well short of the numbers needed. Himmler then allowed a 10 per cent Christian component, but the recruitment of sufficient Muslims continued to prove difficult, resulting in the induction of 2,800 Catholic Croats into the division. To Himmler's dismay, this was greater than the ratio of Catholics to Muslims that he had wanted.

Husejin Biščević (Husejin Biščević or Biščević-beg; born 28 July 1884) was the highest ranking (and perhaps the oldest) Bosnian military officer to volunteer. Bišcević had served in the Austro–Hungarian army and in August 1943 was appointed as an SS-Obersturmbannführer (Note: Equivalent to a U.S. Army lieutenant colonel) to command the divisional anti-aircraft battalion. He was eventually judged unsuitable, and replaced with a German just before the division went into combat.

== Composition ==
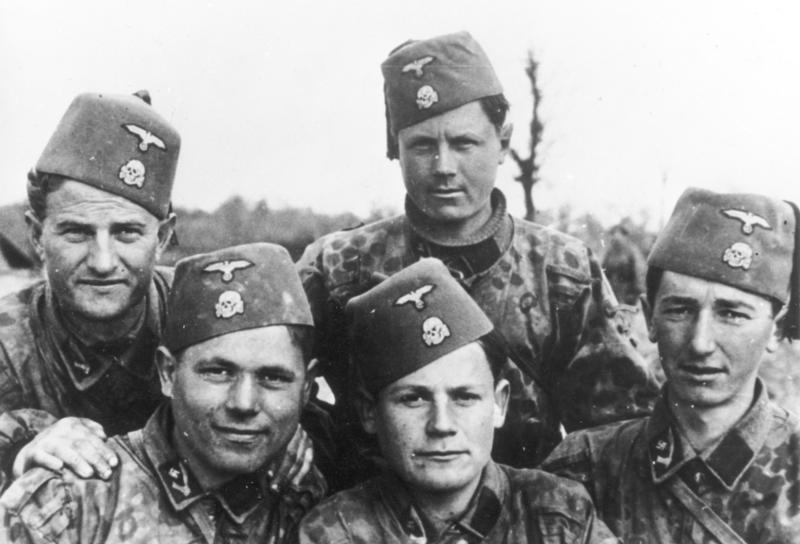
Members of the division during their training

Sources differ regarding the division's initial composition. Pavlowitch states that sixty percent of its recruits were Muslims and the rest were Yugoslav Volksdeutsche, who made up the majority of its officers and non-commissioned officers (NCOs). Tomasevich states that its planned complement was 23,200 Muslims and 2,800 Croats, with mostly German officers. Lepre indicates that the division's prescribed strength was reduced from 26,000 to 21,000, and Cohen states that the division achieved a maximum strength of 17,000 in April 1944. The division had a Muslim imam for each battalion other than the all-German signal battalion. For about six months the division included about 1,000 ethnic Albanians from Kosovo and the Sandžak region who made up the 1st Battalion of the 2nd Regiment, which later became the 1st Battalion of the 28th Regiment (I/28).

By the time the division had completed its training, it was still about one-third below its designated strength in both officers and NCOs, and its officer corps remained almost entirely German. Most of the officers and NCOs were drawn from replacement units of other Waffen-SS divisions.

== Formation, training and mutiny ==
The division was initially sent to southern France for formation and training, where it was accommodated mainly in towns and villages in the Aveyron and Lozère départements. For a long period after its official formation, the division was unnamed and was referred to as the "Kroatische SS-Freiwilligen-Division" (Croatian SS-Volunteer Division) or the "Muselmanen-Division" (Muslim Division). The decision by the Waffen-SS to form and train the division outside Bosnia was contrary to the advice given by the NDH's German plenipotentiary general, Edmund Glaise von Horstenau. This advice soon proved prophetic.

On 9 August 1943, Oberst (Note: Equivalent to a U.S. Army colonel.) Karl-Gustav Sauberzweig took command of the division from von Oberwurzer. Sauberzweig transferred to the Waffen-SS and was appointed to the rank of SS-Oberführer. (Note: Above a U.S. Army colonel, but below brigadier general.) He was a Prussian who had been decorated as an eighteen-year-old company commander during World War I and had served as a regimental commander during the early stages of Operation Barbarossa before being wounded. A "proven leader of men", he spoke no Serbo-Croatian but quickly gained the lasting respect and affection of the men of the division.

=== Villefranche-de-Rouergue Mutiny (September 1943) ===
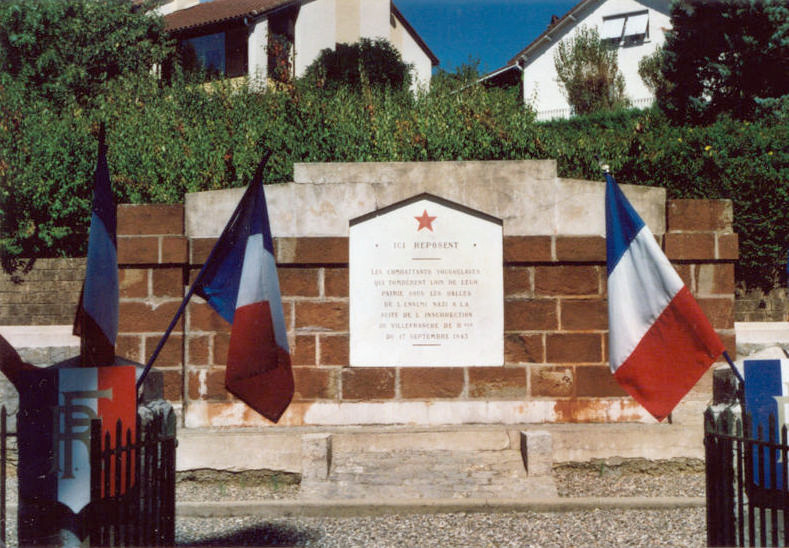
The original memorial to the "Yugoslavian combatants" in Villefranche unveiled in 1952

On the night of 16/17 September 1943, while the 13th SS Division was training in Villefranche-de-Rouergue in France, a group of pro-Partisan soldiers led by Muslim and Catholic junior officers staged a mutiny within the pioneer battalion. Led by Ferid Džanić, Božo Jelinek (aka Eduard Matutinović), Nikola Vukelić and Lutfija Dizdarević, they captured most of the German personnel and executed five German officers, including battalion commander SS-Obersturmbannführer Oskar Kirchbaum. The mutineers believed that many of the enlisted men would join them and they could reach the Western Allies.

The revolt was put down with the assistance of the unit imam, Halim Malkoč, and unit physician Dr. Willfried Schweiger. Malkoč told the Bosnian enlisted men of 1st Company that they were being deceived, released the German NCOs and rallied the company to hunt down the ringleaders. Schweiger did the same with the 2nd Company. Dizdarević and Džanić were shot and killed during the fighting, and Vukelić was captured, while Jelinek escaped.

Sources vary on the number of mutineers killed after the revolt was suppressed. Tomasevich states that 78 of the worst offenders were executed, but Lepre lists only 14 executions while four more deserters were located and shot in late September. Cohen states that about 150 mutineers were killed immediately, while Noel Malcolm writes that 15 of the mutineers died and a further 141 were killed in a subsequent "clean-up operation." The Germans attributed the infiltration to Tito's suggestion that his Partisan followers enlist for police duty to receive superior weapons, uniforms and training. Enlistees who were deemed "unsuitable for service" or "politically unreliable" were subsequently purged. Eventually, 825 Bosnians were removed from the division and sent to Germany for labour service with Organisation Todt. Of these, 265 refused and were sent to the Neuengamme concentration camp where dozens of them died.

Speaking of the Bosnian Muslim troops who had served in the Austro–Hungarian army, Himmler later said, "I knew there was a chance that a few traitors might be smuggled into the division, but I haven't the slightest doubt concerning the loyalty of the Bosnians. These troops were loyal to their supreme commander twenty years ago, so why shouldn't they be so today." Himmler awarded both Malkoč and Schweiger the Iron Cross Second Class for thwarting the mutiny. Five soldiers were also decorated.

When Villefranche-de-Rouergue was liberated in 1944, the local population decided to pay tribute to the mutineers by naming one of its streets Avenue des Croates (The local population saw Bosnian Muslims as Croats of Islamic faith). It still commemorates "the revolt of the Croats" every 17 September. Cohen states that after the war, the Yugoslav government requested a name change to "the Revolt of the Yugoslavs" to obscure the mutineers' ethnicity, but the French refused. The Villefranche-de-Rouergue uprising was also commemorated in the city with a monument designed by Croatian sculptor Vanja Radauš.

=== Silesia ===
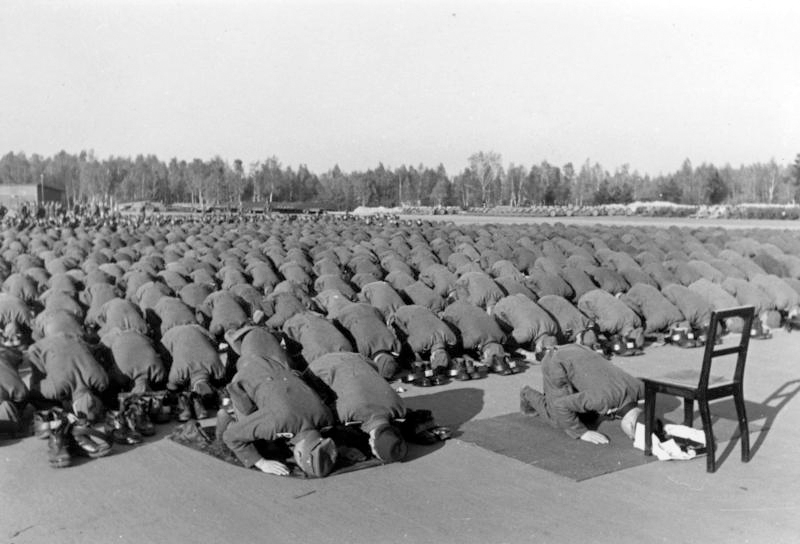
Members of the division at prayer during their training at Neuhammer in November 1943

As a result of the mutiny, the division was moved to the Neuhammer training grounds in the Silesian region of Germany (present-day Poland) to complete its training. During the training phase, the German officers, pleased with its progress, coined the term Mujo for the Bosnian Muslims. The members of the division swore an oath of allegiance to both Hitler and Pavelić.

On 9 October 1943, SS headquarters officially named the division the 13. SS-Freiwilligen b.h. Gebirgs-Division (Kroatien), but a short time later a change was made to differentiate it from those that were composed of Germans and it became the 13th Waffen Mountain Division of the SS Handschar (1st Croatian) (German: 13. Waffen-Gebirgsdivision der SS "Handschar" (kroat. Nr. 1), Serbo-Croatian Latin: 13. oružana brdska divizija SS-a Handžar, također i hrvatska br. 1). The division was named Handschar, after a local fighting knife or sword carried by Turkish policemen during the centuries that the region was part of the Ottoman Empire. On 15 February 1944, the division completed its training and returned to the NDH by rail.

== Anti-Partisan operations March to May 1944 ==
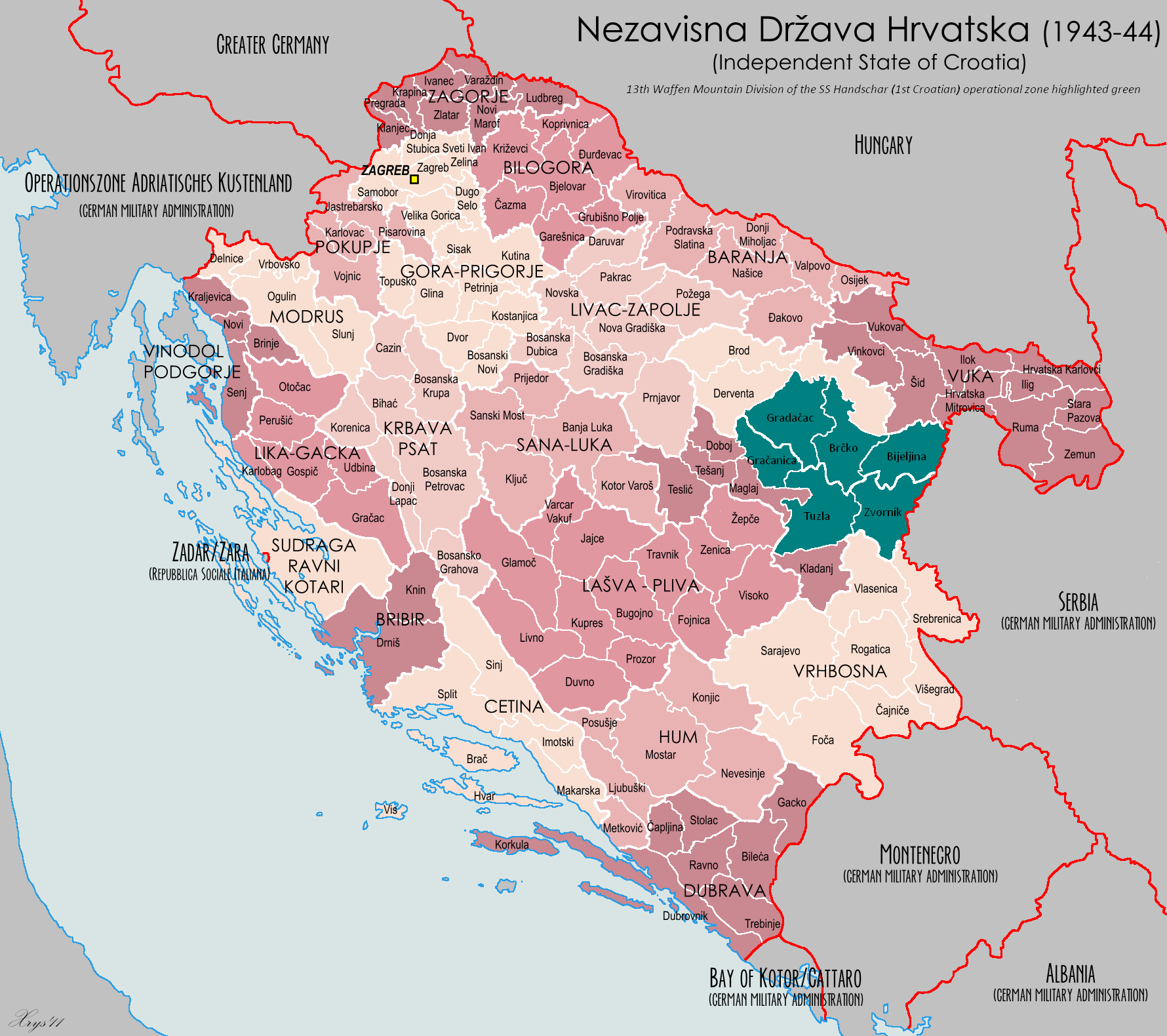
13th SS Division's area of responsibility (in green)

The division was formed for the primary role of securing around 6,000 square kilometres (2,300 sq mi) of territory (the designated security zone) in north-eastern Bosnia within the NDH. The security zone encompassed the Posavina, Semberija and Majevica regions between the Sava, Bosna, Drina and Spreča rivers. It roughly corresponded with the area of operations of the Partisan 3rd Corps. Himmler saw this task as critical to the safeguarding of important agricultural areas and Volksdeutsche settlements in the Syrmia region to the north.

The division participated in what may have been the largest anti-Partisan sweep of World War II: Operation Maibaum. The 13th SS Division also participated in other divisional and corps-sized anti-Partisan operations between March and May 1944.

=== Operation Wegweiser ===
The division first saw action during Operation Wegweiser (signpost) from 9 to 12 March 1944. Operation Wegweiser aimed to clear part of the Syrmia region which was occupied by Partisans who threatened the Zagreb-Belgrade railway. The Partisans were operating from forests around Bosut and villages along the Sava. As the division entered the area, the Partisans withdrew to the southeast, avoiding a decisive engagement. Sauberzweig claimed the Partisans suffered 573 killed and 82 captured. Hoare writes that the division massacred hundreds of Serb civilians during the operation. According to Vladimir Dedijer and Antun Miletić, 223 civilians were killed in Bosut, 352 in Sremska Rača, and 70 in Jamena, mostly old men, women and children. The operation was a success in clearing the Bosut forests, but the Partisans returned to the area soon after it concluded.

=== Operation Save ===
On 15 March 1944, Operation Save was launched to clear Partisans from the Semberija region. Sauberzweig wrote an open letter to the division: "We have now reached the Bosnian frontier and will (soon) begin the march into the homeland. ... The Führer has provided you with his best weapons. Not only do you (have these) in your hands, but above all you have an idea in your hearts – to liberate the homeland. ... Before long, each of you shall be standing in the place that you call home, as a soldier and a gentleman; standing firm as a defender of the idea of saving the culture of Europe – the idea of Adolf Hitler."

Sauberzweig also ordered that each commander read a prepared message as his unit crossed the Sava River, which emphasised that the "liberation of Bosnia" and ultimately the liberation of "Muslim Albania" was their goal. This was a direct appeal to the Albanian troops as well as the Bosnians. The 27th Regiment crossed the Sava at dawn at Bosanska Rača near the confluence with the Drina. The rest crossed at Brčko covered by an intense artillery bombardment. Contact was immediately made with Partisan forces, who quickly withdrew into the forests. The service support units remained north of the Sava in Vinkovci, which became their permanent garrison area. The 27th Regiment advanced easily across the Pannonian Plain through Velino Selo to Brodac and then on to Bijeljina which was taken against light Partisan resistance late on 16 March.

The 27th Regiment then consolidated its position in Bijeljina while the 28th Regiment and the divisional reconnaissance battalion (German: Aufklärungsabteilung) bore the brunt of the fighting as they advanced through Pukis, Čelić and Koraj at the foot of the Majevica mountains. Sauberzweig later recorded that the 2nd battalion of the 28th Regiment (II/28) "at Čelić stormed the Partisan defences with the (new) battalion commander Hans Hanke at the point" and that enemy forces withdrew after a hard battle with heavy losses, low on ammunition.

Once the area was secured, defensive positions were established along the Čelić–Lopare road and company strength units were sent out to conduct reconnaissance. On the night of 17–18 March, elements of the Partisan 16th Vojvodina Division and 36th Vojvodina Division mounted unsuccessful attacks against the 28th Regiment's positions at Koraj and Zabrđe, losing over 200.

=== Operation Osterei ===
After Operation Save, the division remained relatively static for more than three weeks, mopping up and repelling local Partisan attacks. The Muslims were impatient to push further into Bosnia, but the reconnaissance battalion was heavily engaged on the divisional western flank, attacking positions held by the Partisan 3rd Vojvodina Brigade of the 36th Vojvodina Division at Gornji Rahić on 26 March, killing 124 Partisans and capturing 14. The battalion captured several more Partisan positions in the following week. In early April, 200 Partisans of the 16th Muslim Brigade surrendered to the division. They were mostly former members of various Muslim militias who had been conscripted into the ranks of the Partisans.

Operation Osterei (Easter Egg) began on 12 April 1944 intending to clear the Majevica mountain, which was held by elements of the 3rd Corps led by General Kosta Nađ. The 27th Regiment quickly captured Janja and drove through Donja Trnova to reach the Ugljevik coal mines, an important economic objective for the German war machine. Following fighting which continued into the evening of 13 April, the 27th Regiment reported Partisan casualties of 106 dead, 45 captured and two deserters along with large amounts of weapons and ammunition. The regiment also seized a huge amount of medical supplies from aid stations in the area of Donja Trnova.

The 28th Regiment drove south through Mačkovac and during fighting around Priboj, its 1st Battalion (I/28), made up of Albanians, incurred heavy casualties. The Partisan 3rd Corps then withdrew the 16th and 36th Vojvodina Divisions south across the Tuzla–Zvornik road. The reconnaissance battalion continued the advance, driving into the western Majevicas and capturing Srebrnik and Gradačac then linking up with the Croatian Home Guard 1st Mountain Brigade. The Germans considered Operation Osterei a major success, achieving all objectives with minimal losses.

During the final phase of Operation Osterei, I/28 was withdrawn from the fighting and transferred to Pristina in Kosovo to form part of the 21st Waffen Mountain Division of the SS Skanderbeg (1st Albanian) being raised by Himmler's order. A new I/28 was raised from other divisional units and recruits.

In the latter part of Operation Osterei, Jagdkommandos, lightly armed and mobile "hunter teams" of company or battalion strength, were used to break up and harass Partisans still operating on the flanks. These teams killed over 380 Partisans and captured over 200 between 21 and 23 April. By mid-April, half of the security zone had been cleared of Partisans.

=== Operation Maibaum ===
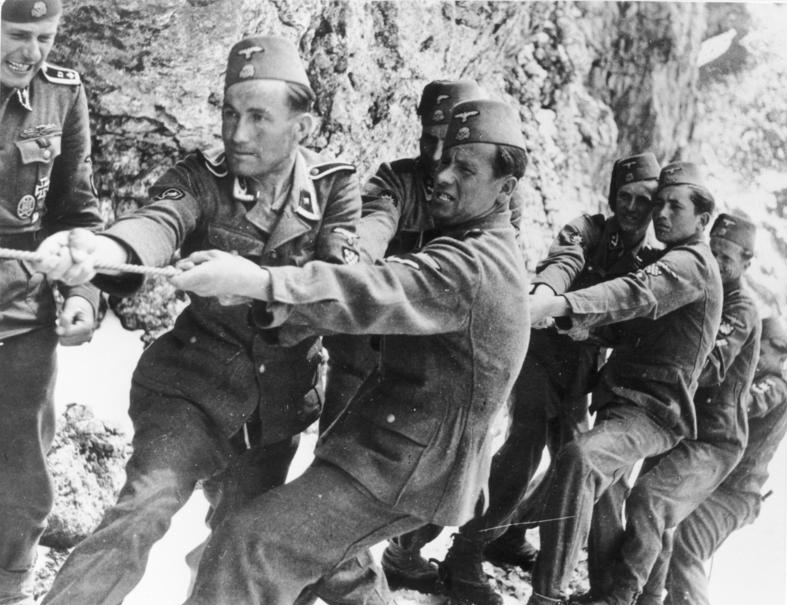
Members of the division on operations during May 1944

The ambitious goal of Operation Maibaum (Maypole) was to destroy the Partisan 3rd Corps. Army Group F ordered V SS Mountain Corps to form a blockade along the Drina to prevent the Partisan force from crossing into Serbia. Operation Maibaum was one of the largest counter-insurgency operations of World War II and included 7th SS Division and NDH forces. The 13th SS Division was under the command of V SS Corps, and the primary tasks of the division were to capture Tuzla and Zvornik, then drive south parallel with the Drina to meet other Corps elements. The original plan included the parachute insertion of the 500th SS Parachute Battalion into the Vlasenica area, but this was cancelled due to unsuitable weather. Flank security was to be provided by the reconnaissance battalion in the Srebrnik area. The deployment south of the Spreča, and therefore outside the security zone, during Operation Maibaum was ordered by the corps commander, Phleps, despite opposition from Sauberzweig. This caused friction between the two that eventually required Himmler's intervention.

On 23 April, the 28th Regiment pushed south along mountain roads through Tuzla. The following day it continued as far as Stupari. On 25 April, the 27th Regiment advanced south to capture Zvornik. At the same time, the 28th Regiment sent I/28 east towards Vlasenica and II/28 continuing south towards Kladanj, capturing the town on 27 April. Due to the level of the Drinjača at Kladanj, instead of fording the river and pushing east towards Vlasenica, II/28 continued south-east towards Han Pijesak, where they met elements of 7th SS Division advancing north.

I/28 captured Vlasenica on 28 April but was almost immediately attacked from the east by two Partisan divisions. A third Partisan division surrounded the headquarters of the 28th Regiment at Šekovići, 30 kilometres north-west of Vlasenica. Both II/28 and the reconnaissance battalion were rushed to Vlasenica, where II/28 relieved the battered I/28 and then surrounded Šekovići. After a 48-hour battle, during which II/28 was decimated, the town was taken.

While the battle of Šekovići raged, the 27th Regiment extended the Drina blockade further south, ambushing a Partisan column and reaching Nova Kasaba on 30 April. After the situation at Šekovići improved on 1 May, the 27th Regiment returned to patrolling the Tuzla–Zvornik road. The 28th Regiment moved to the Simin Han-Lopare area on 5 May, while the 7th SS Division pursued the Partisans withdrawing south.

Operation Maibaum had not only stopped the Partisan 3rd Corps from crossing the Drina into Serbia, it had scattered the Partisan formation. On 6 May, V SS Mountain Corps ordered the division to return to the security zone north of the Spreča.

=== Operation Maiglöckchen ===
On 17–18 May 1944, the division, along with the local Majevica-Tuzla Chetnik unit commanded by Radivoje Kerović, commenced Operation Maiglöckchen (May Bell) to destroy several Partisan brigades in the Majevicas. The Partisans were encircled in the Stolice heights. An attempt by the Partisan 16th Vojvodina Division to relieve the surrounded force was defeated by the reconnaissance battalion and elements of the 28th Regiment. The relieving column was driven back across the Spreća. After heavy bombardment by the artillery regiment, the trapped Partisan force escaped south out of the pocket under cover of darkness on 18 May. The Partisans suffered considerable casualties, for example, the 17th Majevica Brigade of the 27th East Bosnia Division lost 16 killed and 60 missing. At the conclusion of Operation Maiglöckchen, the 27th Regiment remained near Zvornik and the 28th Regiment deployed near Srebrenik.

== Cooperation with local forces ==
Commander of the 13th SS Division, SS-Standartenführer Desiderius Hampel confers with a Chetnik commander Vojvode Radivoje Kerović in the summer of 1944.

After Operation Maiglöckchen, the division shifted to a largely defensive posture aimed at denying the Partisans access to the security zone. Since its arrival in the zone, the division had been assisted in this task by local forces of varying reliability. These included four groups of Chetniks numbering 13,000, Nešad Topčić's Zeleni kadar (or Green Cadres, a Muslim nationalist militia) most of whom eventually joined the Partisans, and both Ustaše militia and the Croatian Home Guard, neither of which was effective. These same groups, along with the Partisans, had simultaneously been trying to encourage Bosnian and Croat members to defect. Between March and June 1944, these attempts were largely fruitless, producing fewer than 200 deserters.

== Anti-Partisan operations, June–August 1944 ==
=== Operation Vollmond ===
Following Operation Rösselsprung (Knight's Move), the German attempt to kill or capture Tito at Drvar in western Bosnia on 25 May 1944, the Partisan leader ordered a general uprising. The Partisan 3rd Corps planned an offensive that involved three parallel columns of divisional strength thrusting north into the zone to engage and destroy German and local allied forces. The columns comprised:

- "Western Column" – 16th Vojvodina Division commanded by Danilo Lekić
- "Centre Column" – 38th East Bosnia Division commanded by Miloš Zekić
- "Eastern Column" – 36th Vojvodina Division commanded by Marko Perić

Operation Vollmond (Full Moon) was devised quickly after the reconnaissance battalion observed Partisan forces crossing the Tuzla–Zvornik road on the evening of 6 June 1944. Sauberzweig's aim was to assault from the east and north, pushing the advancing Partisan forces against the Drina. The German plan underestimated the strength of the Partisan "Western Column" and had placed only one battalion (I/28) on high ground in the Partisans' path. This battalion included many raw recruits and was protecting two batteries of the artillery regiment, one of which (7/AR13) was deployed just east of Lopare.

Late on 7 June, the Partisans scattered I/28 and although II/28 was sent from Srebrenik to assist, the 16th Vojvodina Division surged forward against the positions of 7/AR13, which consisted of 80 men with four 150 mm guns and only one machine gun. After four hours of fighting, and with half the battery's personnel dead, the artillerymen ran out of small arms ammunition and scattered into the forest. As a result of a counterattack by II/28 on the afternoon of 9 June and throughout 10 June, the 16th Vojvodina Division withdrew that afternoon and the battalion pursued both the "Western Column" and "Centre Column" south. The guns and vehicles of 7/AR13 had been destroyed by the Partisans before they withdrew and there were reports that the German dead at Lopare had been mutilated. The "Eastern Column" was stopped by the 27th Regiment and the last of the Partisan 3rd Corps was pushed back across the Spreča on 12 June.

According to German accounts, Operation Vollmond cost the division 205 dead, 528 wounded and 89 missing. I/28 had been decimated, with only 180 men remaining. Sauberzweig claimed 3,000 Partisans were killed in this operation, but Phleps dismissed this as "a large exaggeration". According to one German after-action report, they had killed over 1,500 Partisans and captured large amounts of arms and ammunition. According to Partisan sources, the losses of the Partisan 3rd Corps were:

- "Western Column" – 58 dead, 198 wounded and 29 missing
- "Central Column" – 12 dead, 19 wounded, 17 missing
- "Eastern Column" – 72 dead, 142 wounded and 9 missing

After Operation Vollmond, the commander of the 27th Regiment, Desiderius Hampel, was appointed division commander at his substantive rank of Standartenführer and Sauberzweig was tasked with forming a new corps headquarters, the IX Waffen Mountain Corps of the SS (Croatian). The commander of the 28th Regiment, Helmuth Raithel, was tasked to raise the new 23rd Waffen Mountain Division of the SS Kama (2nd Croatian). Both the new corps headquarters and new division were to be formed in southern Hungary. Three NCOs from every company of the 13th SS Division, along with other personnel, were transferred to form the core of the 23rd SS Division. New commanders were appointed to the two mountain infantry regiments, notably Hanke to the 28th.

Soon after Hampel assumed command, he became aware that local Chetniks were scavenging the Operation Vollmond battlefields for divisional equipment. He met with the Chetnik leader Kerović and arranged for the return of the equipment in exchange for small arms ammunition and boxes of hand grenades.

Throughout the remainder of June 1944 and into the first week of July, the division was engaged in fighting off attempted Partisan incursions into the security zone and reinforcing local NDH and Chetniks who were under attack from the Partisans. During the summer of 1944, elements of the division were tasked with guarding Hungarian Jewish forced labourers building fortifications in Tuzla. While guarding the labourers, they subjected them to cruel treatment and shot 22 who were unable to continue working.

=== Operation Fliegenfänger ===
Operation Fliegenfänger (Flypaper) was launched on 14 July 1944. It aimed to destroy a makeshift Partisan runway and the Partisan forces guarding it in the Osmaci area about 26 kilometres (16 mi) southeast of Tuzla, south of the Tuzla–Zvornik road. The airstrip was just north of the southern boundary of the security zone and was being used by Allied aircraft to bring in supplies and evacuate wounded Partisans to Italy. It had been built by the 19th Birač Brigade of the 27th East Bosnia Division between 3 and 6 July, and the first flight into the airfield occurred on the night of 6/7 July. The 19th Birač Brigade was also responsible for its defence. Two battalions of the 27th Regiment, along with a battalion of Chetniks from Majevica launched the operation from the line of Caparde–Memići–Prnjavor, and captured the towns of Osmaci and Memići and damaged the airfield despite stiff resistance. That afternoon, the 19th Birač Brigade counter-attacked and pushed the German and Chetniks back across the Tuzla–Zvornik road. At the same time as the counter-attack was underway, the headquarters of the Partisan 3rd Corps ordered the 36th Vojvodina Division to clear the enemy from the area so that the airfield could be used. During the night of 14/15 July, elements of the 36th Vojvodina Division arrived in the Osmaci area and relieved the 19th Birač Brigade, which moved towards Srebrenica. During the night of 16/17 July, Allied aircraft delivered equipment to Osmaci and about 100 wounded Partisans were airlifted to Italy.

According to German reports, 42 Partisans were killed, while the division's losses were four dead and seven wounded. The Partisan force withdrew south to the Vlasenica–Rajići area. The cooperation with the Chetnik battalion was described in the IX SS Mountain Corps war diary as "effective".

=== Operation Heiderose ===
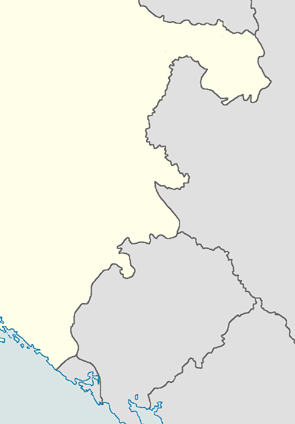
Map of the eastern NDH showing Partisan-held areas targeted by German and Chetnik forces during Operation Heiderose

While the division was conducting Operation Fliegenfänger, the Second Panzer Army was developing a plan to block a large Partisan force from moving from central Bosnia into western Serbia to reinforce the Partisans. Due to issues with the availability of various units of V SS Mountain Corps, the planned Operation Rose was cancelled.

In the interim, since most of the division was deployed in the southern part of the security zone, Hampel planned a divisional-level operation, named Operation Heiderose (Wild Rose) targeting Partisan positions north-west of Šekovići, south of the Spreča. The 27th Regiment, reinforced by the same Chetnik battalion that cooperated in Operation Fliegenfänger, would attack east towards Šekovići and the 28th Regiment would push south. A detached battalion of the 7th SS Division would act as a blocking force driving north. Hampel was unhappy with the performance of the new commander of the 27th Regiment (SS-Obersturmbannführer Hermann Peter) and put the divisional chief of staff, SS-Sturmbannführer (Note: Equivalent to a U.S. Army major.) Erich Braun, in charge of the 27th Regiment.

On 17 July, the operation began. Fierce resistance was immediately encountered by the 28th Regiment, while the 27th Regiment climbed the heights to Udrč before dusk without serious opposition. Early on 18 July, the Chetniks attacked from Matkovac towards Šekovići. The 27th Regiment reached Bačkovac and seized the high ground south of Šekovići on 19 July 1944. The 28th Regiment forced the Partisan 36th Vojvodina Division back. The battalion from the 7th SS Division encountered serious resistance around Vlasenica but pushed through. On 19 July, the 28th Regiment drove north towards Gornje Petrovice to attack the Partisan 12th Corps at Živinice. The reconnaissance battalion of the 7th SS Division pushed in from Vareš as a blocking force to stop the Partisans from withdrawing via Kladanj.

The Partisans then committed the 16th Vojvodina Division to assist the 36th Vojvodina Division which had borne the brunt of Operation Heiderose to this point. On 20 July, both divisions attacked the 27th Regiment, which counterattacked the following day after the Partisans were rebuffed with heavy casualties. On 23 July, the Partisans began to withdraw south out of the area. The division began to search for the hidden Partisan bases that German intelligence had indicated were located there. After a day of searching, the division uncovered more than ten Partisan bases, which the cooperating Chetniks began to clear despite having shown little interest in actually fighting the Partisans in previous days.

Operation Heiderose was a significant success for the division, inflicting serious losses on the Partisans. More than 900 Partisans were killed and a large amount of equipment was captured: one anti-tank gun, two mortars, 22 machine guns, over 800 rifles and nearly 500,000 rounds of small arms ammunition. The division suffered 24 killed and over 150 wounded. Communist sources hold that the Partisans suffered serious losses, with the 12th Corps alone having 250 dead, wounded and missing. However, Partisan reports estimate that German losses were significantly larger than their own. Erich Braun was recommended for the Knight's Cross of the Iron Cross but the recommendation was not supported, apparently due to disagreements between the divisional staff and Phleps that had occurred during the division's formation.

=== Operation Hackfleisch ===
In the first week of August 1944, the Second Panzer Army was finally ready to move to thwart the Partisan advance from Bosnia into Serbia, originally planned as Operation Rose. Renamed Operation Rübezahl (Mountain Spirit), the revamped plan required the 7th and 13th SS Divisions to form the Bosnian phase of the operation, named Operation Hackfleisch (Minced Meat). Hackfleisch aimed to drive out the Partisans occupying the area between the towns of Kladanj, Vlasenica, Sokolac and Olovo, south of the security zone. The overall plan involved columns that were to force the Partisans eastwards into the pincers of the other units, thereby destroying them.

The columns were allocated tasks and composed as follows:

- the reconnaissance battalion of the 7th SS Division was to drive west from Vareš and attack the Partisans around the town of Olovo, pushing them east;
- I/28 from the 13th SS Division was to attack south and south-east from Ribnica towards Olovo;
- III/28 from the 13th SS Division was to thrust south and south-east from Kladanj towards the village of Petrović;
- The 27th Regiment of the 13th SS Division was to drive southwards from Šekovići;
- parts of the 14th Regiment of the 7th SS Division were to push north-west between Olovo and Sokolac; and
- parts of the 13th Regiment of the 7th SS Division were to attack northwards through Sokolac.

The 27th Regiment became locked in fierce fighting with the Partisan 27th East Bosnia Division and 38th Bosnia Division, which had launched an offensive near Vlasenica. The inability of the 27th Regiment to push forward meant that the plan to encircle the Partisan force was not achieved and the Partisans escaped by crossing the Vlasenica–Han Pijesak road to the east. Other Partisan forces withdrew in the direction of Goražde.

As far as the Germans were concerned, Operation Hackfleisch was a moderate success, with 227 Partisans killed and over 50 prisoners taken. It delayed, but did not prevent, the Partisans' advance into Serbia. To allow the 7th SS Division to pursue Partisan forces withdrawing towards central Bosnia, both I/28 and III/28 were placed under the command of that division for the period of 8–17 August 1944. During the remainder of August 1944, the rump of the division fought hard to keep the Partisans out of the security zone. The Partisan 11th Krajina Division and 38th Bosnia Division quickly infiltrated into the southern part of the security zone and the 27th East Bosnia Division crossed into the area north-west of Srebrenica and drove towards Bratunac. After a series of rapid redeployments and battalion and regimental attacks, the division scattered the 11th Krajina Division and mauled the 27th East Bosnia Division.

The division had by now been fighting almost continuously throughout the summer. According to divisional commander Hampel, it had been exhausted even before Operation Hackfleisch began. The cumulative effect of this exhaustion, the deteriorating situation that the Germans faced on all fronts and rumours probably spread among members by the Partisans and Ustaše, was that the division began to disintegrate in early September 1944.

== Last battles against the Partisans ==
In early September 1944, the division returned north to the security zone, basing the infantry battalions in the villages of Kurukaja, Vukovije (south of Foča), Osmaci and Srebrnik. Almost immediately, the Partisan 3rd Corps commenced an offensive, attacking II/28 at Srebrnik. It held on despite being pressed hard during two days of fighting against the 11th Krajina Division. By the end of the first week in September, divisional supply columns were being attacked by Chetniks, sensing German weakness and looking for arms and supplies. Three members of the division were killed in these attacks. Over the same week, the Allies conducted Operation Ratweek throughout the Balkans, which involved Allied air power pounding Axis troop concentrations and key infrastructure to impede the German withdrawal from Greece. The local effect was to complicate the division's logistics through the destruction of the Sarajevo-Brod railway and mass desertions of NDH troops tasked with securing supply lines.

On 8 September, II/27 was assaulted unsuccessfully by the Partisans at Matkovac. After the first week of September, most of the division's fighting power was shifted to the western boundary of the security zone to meet Partisan incursions. The division succeeded in dislodging Partisan units from Slatna and Međeđa and allied Chetniks captured Skurgić. After relief by NDH forces, the division's fighting regiments withdrew to Brčko for rest and refit. As a result of the shift to the western area of the security zone, the zone's southern area was quickly overrun by Partisan forces. Zvornik and Tuzla had fallen by mid-September.

== August 1944 – May 1945 ==
On 17 August 1944, Tito offered a general amnesty and many in the division took advantage of this opportunity. During the first three weeks of September, while hard fighting continued, over 2,000 Bosnians deserted, many taking their weapons with them. They went home, joined the Green Cadres militia or went over to the Ustaše. Many defected to the Partisans, with over 700 having joined the Partisan 3rd Corps by early October.

Due to high rates of desertion from the 13th SS Division, Sauberzweig proposed to disarm the Bosnians in both the 13th SS Division and the 23rd SS Division, but Himmler instead opted to transport the 2,000 Bosnians of the 23rd SS Division from Hungary to Bosnia and re-organise the remaining troops of both divisions there, with key support units from 13th SS Division centralised under IX SS Mountain Corps, which would also move to Bosnia from Hungary.

In the early morning of 3 October 1944, the Partisan 28th Slavonia Division assaulted a squadron of the reconnaissance battalion at Janja close to the Drina on the eastern boundary of the security zone. As they broke out of the encirclement to the north, the rest of the reconnaissance battalion drove south from Bijeljina and stopped the Partisan advance at heavy cost. Rushing towards Janja from the east, III/27 came into contact with Partisans around Modran, reaching the Janja garrison at 10 pm that night and receiving artillery reinforcement by 3/AR 13 during the night. At dawn the following day, an additional four Partisan brigades attacked the garrison in Janja, with fighting continuing throughout the day before the Partisans withdrew to the south. Jagdkommandos were sent after the fleeing enemy but were not able to inflict significant losses on them as they had already crossed the Drina into the German-occupied territory of Serbia. Following this battle, Army Group F concluded that the division's overall combat value was minimal.

A few days later, the 9th Company of the 28th Regiment (9/28) displayed what could still be achieved by the Bosnians under determined leadership when Leutnant (Note: Equivalent to a U.S. Army second lieutenant.) Hans König ambushed the Partisan 17th Majevica Brigade near Vukosavci, killing at least 67 and capturing orders for future operations. König was awarded the German Cross in Gold for his fanatical leadership.

=== Division splits ===
While 9/28 was fighting near Vukosavci, several units, consisting mainly of artillery, were temporarily detached for duty with other formations of the Second Panzer Army fighting Soviet troops within the German-occupied territory of Serbia. The division was not re-united until January 1945.

After a request from Army Group F to Himmler, a decision was made to move IX SS Mountain Corps and the division to perform road and railway security duties near Zagreb. This would relieve the LXIX Army Corps from those duties so that it could reinforce a defensive line along the Drina facing the advancing Red Army. The 28th Regiment, I/27 and III/AR 13 were to remain behind at the Brčko bridgehead to keep the Sava river bridge open. The heavy desertions from the division were the main reason for the move from north-east Bosnia to northern Croatia, but it made matters worse: the Bosnians were very reluctant to leave Bosnia and the already serious desertion rate became a flood when the move began on 16 October 1944. Many took their weapons with them and hundreds joined the Partisans. In mid-October, 700 members of the division stationed at Orašje joined the Partisans, and were distributed between the 17th Majevica Brigade and 21st East Bosnian Brigade.

=== Operation Herbstlaub ===
On 20 October, the Red Army and Partisan forces captured Belgrade and the following day the divisional staff imam, Abdulah Muhasilović, incited a mutiny and led 100 men back to Bosnia. Himmler finally agreed to the disarming of the "unreliable" Bosnians under Operation Herbstlaub (Autumn Leaves) on 25 October. Between 900 and 1,000 Bosnians in the Brčko bridgehead and over 2,300 in Zagreb were allocated to labour battalions and similar non-combatant auxiliary duties, although the disarming operation was not completed in the Zagreb area until mid-November. By the beginning of November the division, which had been ninety-five percent non-German in January 1944, became fifty percent German. The plans to re-organise the division were abandoned and Sauberzweig was relieved of command. In addition, Sauberzweig's IX SS Mountain Corps staff was dissolved and the remnants were placed under the command of LXVIII Army Corps, under which they remained for the rest of the war.

=== Fighting Soviet troops ===
Accounts differ on the fate of the division: author George Lepre says the division fought until the end of the war with Bosnians, while author George H. Stein states that in November, before fighting the Soviets, all Muslim personnel were disbanded and the associated German personnel and equipment were deployed elsewhere. Meanwhile, the advance of the Red Army through Belgrade and north into the formerly Hungarian-occupied Yugoslav region of Baranja made holding the line of the Danube critical for the Germans. In early November the Soviet troops established a bridgehead over the Danube from Apatin (in modern-day Serbia). From 9 November onward, the division was committed in several stages to the Eastern Front, starting with the reconnaissance battalion which went into action at Dárda west of the Apatin bridgehead on 10 November. They were followed by a grouping of three battalions (I/27, II/28 and II/28), an artillery battalion (III/AR 13) and pioneer support. Known as Kampfgruppe Hanke after their commander Hans Hanke, they moved from the Brčko bridgehead and joined a blocking position at Pélmonostor on 14 November south-west of a second Soviet bridgehead that had been established at Batina (in modern-day Croatia). As a result, the last Muslim SS troops left Bosnia. Within a week they were joined by the reconnaissance battalion, which had acquitted itself well in fighting west of Apatin. By 20 November, the Red Army was across the Danube in force at Batina. The following day Kampfgruppe Hanke was driven out of its positions when the remaining 200 troops withdrew. By 25 November the rest of the division was on its way from the Zagreb area. The remnants of Kampfgruppe Hanke were placed under command of Reichsgrenadier Division Hoch und Deutschmeister, withdrawing as far as Siklós in southern Hungary by 29 November.

Within days Kampfgruppe Hanke was withdrawn from the front line to rejoin the division and re-fit, and they were moved to Barcs on the Drava river for that purpose. On 2 December the division was reunited, except for the rest of the pioneer battalion, which remained stranded in Bosnia by damaged bridges and railways. As a result of continued desertions and the catastrophic casualties suffered by Kampfgruppe Hanke, the division retained little of its original Bosnian character. Despite the return of disarmed Bosnians from labour units, the attachment of Hungarian infantry and artillery units and the arrival of German replacements meant the division looked almost the same as any other unit in the Second Panzer Army.

After a short break, the division was allocated to a sector of the Margarethe Line, a series of fixed defensive works south of Lake Balaton which held up the Soviet advance. After several Red Army assaults were repulsed, static trench warfare developed between December 1944 and January 1945. In early March 1945, a few units took part in Operation Frühlingserwachen (Spring Awakening), which was to be Germany's last major offensive. Meanwhile, from December 1944 to March 1945, the rest of the division remained at Barcs rebuilding. In February, they had been joined by the divisional pioneer battalion, which had finally managed to withdraw from Bosnia. On 16 March, the Soviets launched the Vienna Offensive, bypassing the Barcs area. That night, the division attacked the flanks of the Soviet drive at Heresznye, where it undertook its last offensive operation of the war.

=== Retreat to the Reich ===
On 29 March, the Soviet 57th Army and the Bulgarian First Army assaulted the entire Second Panzer Army front, quickly breaching the line near Nagybajom. The division, holding positions just south of the penetration, began to withdraw to the northwest. It fell back to the Mura and barely managed to cross under constant air and ground attacks, with grievous casualties. Unable to take up effective positions, the division crossed the Reich frontier on 6 April and took up positions at Pettau in the so-called "Reich Defence Line", where it remained until 5 May. Its last fighting was around Kiesmanndorff on 19 April.

On 5 May, the division's remaining men, both German and Bosnian, began to retreat northwards towards Austria. On 8 May, an order was sent to retreat to Wolfsberg, Carinthia. On learning of the orders, unit imams of the 28th Regiment "approached their commander, Hans Hanke and requested that they and their men be discharged and be allowed to attempt to return to their homeland ... Soon, all of the Bosnians remaining in the division were asked if they wished to remain." There are two reports of large-scale reprisal killings of these members of the division by the Partisans, one of which included the mass shooting of 1,400 soldiers.

The retreat continued until 11 May. On 12 May, Hampel carried out surrender negotiations with the British Army at Sankt Veit an der Glan. On 15 May most of the men were transported to Rimini in Italy, where they were incarcerated with other prisoners of war from 7th SS Division and 16th SS Panzergrenadier Division Reichsführer-SS. Scattered remnants did not surrender until 18 May and many attempted to obliterate their SS blood group tattoo. Hampel escaped from a prisoner-of-war camp in Fallingbostel.

== Aftermath ==
While it achieved successes and proved itself competent in counter-insurgency operations against the Partisans in eastern Bosnia, the division earned a reputation for brutality and savagery, not only during combat operations, but also through atrocities committed against Serb and Jewish civilians in the security zone. Its reprisal attacks in northern and eastern Bosnia left many hundreds and possibly as many as several thousand Serb civilians dead by the spring and summer of 1944. The post-war Nuremberg trials made the declaratory judgement that the Waffen-SS was a criminal organisation due to its major involvement in war crimes and crimes against humanity, including the killing of prisoners-of-war and atrocities committed in occupied countries. Excluded from this judgement were those who were conscripted into the Waffen-SS and had not personally committed war crimes and crimes against humanity.

Thirty-eight members of the division were extradited to Yugoslavia to face trial following the war. Some committed suicide, including Generalleutnant (Note: Equivalent to a U.S. Army major general) Sauberzweig on 20 October 1946 and SS-Obersturmführer (Note: Equivalent to a U.S. Army first lieutenant.) Hans König. Trials took place at a military court in Sarajevo between 22 and 30 August 1947. Only seven of the 38 defendants were charged with specific offences, although the indictment accused the division of murdering some 5,000 people. The accused were defended by three Yugoslav lawyers: two civilians and one military officer. All were found guilty; 10 were sentenced to death, and 28 received prison terms of between five years and life. SS-Obersturmführer Imam Halim Malkoč had already been executed in Bihać on 7 March 1947. All of those who were executed were junior officers and non-commissioned officers. Almost all the prisoners were released early and by 1952 all had been freed, except for one who had died. Having escaped, Hampel never faced trial and lived in Graz, Austria until his death on 11 January 1981.

Hundreds of members of the 13th and 23rd SS Divisions volunteered to fight in the 1948–1949 Arab–Israeli War. The Syrian government requested the transfer of 8,000 Bosnian Muslim refugees to Syria, many for recruitment into the Syrian Armed Forces. Iraq sent representatives to Europe and invited 2,500 Bosnian Muslims to settle there. Frantzman and Culibrk estimate that approximately 1,000 former Bosnian Muslim SS members fought in Palestine. Many of the volunteers served in the Arab Liberation Army's Ajnaddin Battalion.

== Commanders ==
The following officers commanded the division. The first two raised and trained the division in its early stages of development and Sauberzweig and Hampel commanded it on active operations against the Partisans and later against the Red Army and Bulgarians:

- SS-Gruppenführer und Generalleutnant der Waffen-SS Artur Phleps (in charge of raising the division, from 13 February 1943)
- SS-Standartenführer der Reserve Herbert Von Obwurzer (9 March 1943 – 1 August 1943)
- SS-Brigadeführer und Generalmajor der Waffen-SS Karl-Gustav Sauberzweig (1 August 1943 – 1 June 1944)
- SS-Brigadeführer und Generalmajor der Waffen-SS Desiderius Hampel (1 June 1944 – 12 May 1945)

== Awards ==
Several members were decorated with high German military awards, with five awarded the Knight's Cross of the Iron Cross (including Hampel and Hanke), five awarded the German Cross in Gold (including Hanke) and one awarded the German Cross in Silver. All five presentations of the Knight's Cross to members of the division are disputed and cannot be verified at the German National Archive. According to Gerhard von Seemen, Hampel, Karl Liecke and Hanke presumably received the Knight's Cross on the same day from the commander of the 2nd Panzer Army, General der Artillerie (Note: Equivalent to a U.S. Army lieutenant general) Maximilian de Angelis.

== Order of battle ==
The divisional order of battle was:

- 27th Waffen Gebirgsjäger (Mountain Infantry) Regiment of the SS (1st Croatian)
- 28th Waffen Gebirgsjäger (Mountain Infantry) Regiment of the SS (2nd Croatian)
- 13th SS Mountain Artillery Regiment
- 13th SS Mountain Reconnaissance Battalion
- 13th SS Panzerjäger (Anti-tank) Battalion
- 13th SS Mountain Pioneer Battalion
- 13th SS Anti-aircraft Battalion
- 13th SS Mountain Signals Battalion
- 13th SS Division Supply Battalion
- 13th SS Logistics Battalion
- 13th SS Medical Battalion
- 13th SS Replacement Battalion

From 24 September 1944, the supply and logistics battalions were combined to form the 13th SS Service Support/Supply Regiment.

== Insignia, uniform and divisional song ==
The collar patch of Handschar, worn on the right collar in place of the SS Sig runes worn by Germanic SS divisions

The division's identification symbol, used on its vehicles, was the Handschar sword. The uniform was a regular SS M43 field jacket issue, with a divisional collar patch showing an arm holding a scimitar over a swastika. On the left arm was a Croatian armshield (red-white chessboard) and on the right, the Edelweiss flower patch of the German mountain troops. The chessboard armshield was controversial, especially with the imams, who, after crossing the Sava river, removed them. Former SS personnel serving in the division were entitled to wear a Sig Rune badge that was attached to the left breast pocket of the tunic.

Headgear was either the SS M43 fez which was to be worn by all ranks, while German officers had the option to wear the mountain cap (Bergmütze). The fez was chosen by Himmler because it had been worn by the Bosnian-Herzegovinian Infantry regiments of the Austro-Hungarian army from 1894 to 1918, as well as by the Austro-Hungarian Albanian Legion from 1916 to 1918. There were two versions of the fez: a field grey model to be worn in combat and while on duty and a red model for parades, marching exercises and while off duty. Both the fez and mountain cap bore the death's head and eagle of the SS. The mountain cap was also adorned with an Edelweiss flower patch, worn on the left side of the cap.

The divisional song was set to the melody of "Wir fahren gegen Engelland" by Herms Niel.

== See also ==
- List of Waffen-SS units
- Relations between Nazi Germany and the Arab world
- Table of ranks and insignia of the Waffen-SS
- Waffen-SS foreign volunteers and conscripts
