= Halim Malkoč =

Waffen SS volunteer (1917–1947)

- Malkoč addressing members of the division
- Born: 12 August 1917; Sokolac, Condominium of Bosnia and Herzegovina, Austria-Hungary
- Died: 8 February 1947 (aged 29); Bihać, PR Bosnia and Herzegovina, FPR Yugoslavia
- Cause of death: Execution by firing squad
- Military career
- Allegiance: Kingdom of Yugoslavia (–1941); Independent State of Croatia; Nazi Germany
- Branch: (Schutzstaffel) Waffen-SS
- Service years: 1943–1945
- Rank: SS-Obersturmführer
- Unit: 13th Waffen Mountain Division of the SS Handschar (1st Croatian)
- Conflicts: World War II
- Awards: Iron Cross
- Other work: Imam

Halim Malkoč (12 August 1917 – 8 February 1947) was a Bosniak imam and SS-Obersturmführer in the Waffen-SS division Handschar, and the first Muslim awarded the German Iron Cross during World War II. He received the medal for his involvement in the suppression of a mutiny in Villefranche-de-Rouergue in 1943.

== Early life ==
Malkoč was born in Sokolac to Šaćir and Džehva Malkoč (née Muhamedagić). He was married and had two children.

== Military career ==
Malkoč was a young imam in Bosnia when the war broke out. According to author George Lepre, he "had served on active duty as an officer in the Royal Yugoslav Army and was a gifted military leader". In 1943, he joined the newly formed Waffen-SS division Handschar and was initially appointed an imam to the SS-Gebirgs-Pionier Bataillion 13. In July, he and several other Bosnian ulema were sent to Dresden for a three-week "imam training course" organised by SS-Obergruppenführer Gottlob Berger and the Grand Mufti of Jerusalem, Amin al-Husseini. Classes included lessons on "The Waffen-SS: Its Organization and Ranks" and German language training. There were also excursions to the Berlin Opera and the Babelsberg Palace, Potsdam and the Nicholaisee.

=== Villefranche-de-Rouergue uprising ===
During training, communist agents provocateurs in the division staged a mutiny on 17 September near Villefranche-de-Rouergue in France, in which several SS officers were executed. A German named Dr. Willfried Schweiger turned to Malkoč for help. The imam eventually persuaded the men to surrender and disarm. A report stated, "To complete this task the doctor sought the assistance of Imam Malkoč, who proved to be quite helpful, demanding complete obedience from the troops."

In recognition of his services, he was awarded the Iron Cross, Second Class in October 1943. A year later he was appointed imam for the entire division after the first appointee, Abdulah Muhasilović, deserted on 21 October 1944.

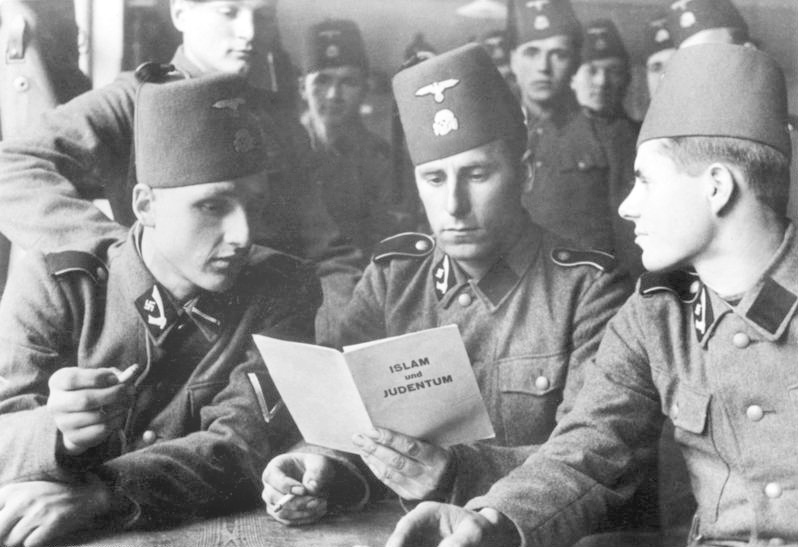
Soldiers of the Handschar, 1943

== Death ==
After the war, Malkoč was tried by Yugoslavia's new Communist government. On 5 November 1946, he was sentenced to death by firing squad. The sentence was carried out in Bihać on 8 February 1947.

== See also ==
- Alija Šuljak
