= Dieter Sauberzweig =

German politician (1925–2005)

Dieter Sauberzweig (17 November 1925 – 28 December 2005) was a prominent commentator on German cultural politics (Kulturpolitiker).

== Life ==
Dieter Sauberzweig was born in Frankfurt (Oder), the son of Wehrmacht career officer Karl-Gustav Sauberzweig. He grew up in Berlin, Hanover and Vienna, where he graduated from high school in 1942. In the same year he was drafted into military service and served in World War II.

After the war he completed an apprenticeship in Schleswig-Holstein in 1947 and studied History, Education, Psychology and Philosophy at the University of Hamburg. Between 1950 and 1971 he worked on several radio stations as a freelancer. From 1953 he worked at the Education Foundation of the German people (Studienstiftung des deutschen Volkes). A year later received his doctorate in Hamburg.

In 1977 the new SPD Mayor of Berlin, Dietrich Stobbe, invited Dieter Sauberzweig to become a senator for culture in his cabinet. He remained there until a new CDU Cabinet obliged him to vacate his seat in 1981.

After 1981 Sauberzweig managed the German Institute of Urban Affairs (Deutschen Instituts für Urbanistik) in Berlin, a position he held until 1991. In 1983, he was also Honorary Professor at the University of Konstanz. From 1999 to 2002 he was curator of the Capital Cultural Fund (Hauptstadtkulturfonds).

Sauberzweig was twice married and had two children.

== Awards ==
- 2001: Verdienstorden des Landes Berlin (Service Order of the State of Berlin)
