= 36th Division (Yugoslav Partisans) =

36th Vojvodina Division
- Flag of Democratic Federal Yugoslavia (used by the Partisans)
- Active: 1944–1945
- Country: Democratic Federal Yugoslavia
- Branch: Yugoslav Partisan Army
- Type: Infantry
- Size: Division
- Part of: Partisan 3rd Corps; Partisan 12th Corps; Partisan 3rd Army
- Engagements: World War II in Yugoslavia * Operation Save * Operation Osterei * Operation Heiderose * Belgrade Offensive * Battle of Batina * Syrmian Front * Operation Wehrwolf (Yugoslavia)

Commanders
- Notable commanders: Dušan Vukasović

The 36th Vojvodina Division (Serbo-Croatian Latin: Tridesetšesta vojvođanska divizija) was a Yugoslav Partisan division that fought against the Germans, Independent State of Croatia (NDH) and Chetniks in occupied Democratic Federal Yugoslavia during World War II.

When it was created it consisted mostly of Serbs recruited from Hungarian–occupied Bačka. As part of the Partisan 3rd Corps then Partisan 12th Corps it spent most of 1944 engaged in hard fighting against the 13th Waffen Mountain Division of the SS Handschar (1st Croatian) in eastern Bosnia.

The Division also participated in the Battle of Batina (November 1944).
