= Karl-Gustav Sauberzweig =

WWII German general

- Karl-Gustav Sauberzweig as an SS-Oberführer
- Born: 1 September 1899; Wissek, Province of Posen, Kingdom of Prussia, German Empire (now Wysoka, Greater Poland Voivodeship, Poland)
- Died: 20 October 1946 (aged 47); Neuengamme internment camp near Hamburg, Allied-occupied Germany
- Military career
- Allegiance: German Empire; Weimar Republic; Nazi Germany
- Branch: Waffen-SS
- Service years: 1917–1945
- Rank: SS-Gruppenführer and Generalleutnant of the Waffen-SS
- Nickname: Schnellchen (Speedy)
- Unit: 13th Waffen Mountain Division of the SS Handschar (1st Croatian)
- Conflicts: World War I World War II
- Awards: Iron Cross I Class

Karl-Gustav Sauberzweig (1 September 1899 – 20 October 1946) was a German Army Oberst (colonel) who transferred to the Waffen-SS during World War II and commanded the 13th Waffen Mountain Division of the SS Handschar (1st Croatian) in 1943–1944, and the IX Waffen Mountain Corps of the SS (Croatian) in 1944–1945, reaching the rank of SS-Gruppenführer and Generalleutnant of the Waffen-SS. He returned to the Wehrmacht in January 1945 and was appointed as a Generalleutnant to command a corps within Army Group H in northern Germany. Faced with the prospect of being extradited to Yugoslavia to stand trial for war crimes, Sauberzweig committed suicide in Allied captivity in 1946.

== Early life and career ==
Born in Wissek (Wysoka), Province of Posen, to Dr. Joachim Sauberzweig and educated in Bromberg, Karl-Gustav Sauberzweig entered the army on 28 September 1916 and served in World War I, earning the Iron Cross in 1918. "A proven leader of men, Sauberzweig had commanded a company and garnered the Iron Cross First Class by the age of eighteen, and earned a reputation as an exceptional organizer. His tireless determination and exacting work ethic earned him the nickname Schnellchen ("Speedy")." After the war, Sauberzweig continued to serve in the Reichswehr. He married Erna Giese in 1924, and his son Dieter was born in 1925. In April 1933 he was promoted to Hauptmann (captain) and then served as a tactics instructor in Signals. With the expansion of the Reichswehr into the Wehrmacht, Sauberzweig was appointed as an instructor to the Army and Air Force Signals school in Halle, Saxony-Anhalt in 1934.

In the fall of 1936, Sauberzweig was promoted second Staff Officer (Ib) to the General Command XI Army Corps and moved to Hanover. He was then responsible for quartermaster supplies and care. On 1 October 1936 Sauberzweig was promoted to the rank of Major and on 1 March 1938 to Oberstleutnant (lieutenant colonel). After the annexation of Austria, he was assigned on 1 April 1938 to the General Command XVII. Army Corps in Vienna. In this capacity, he served in the invasion of Poland in 1939.

== World War II ==
At the end of September 1939, Sauberzweig was placed in the training department of the General Staff of the Army. In mid-December 1939, he returned to the General Command XI. Army Corps and in the spring of 1940 became the first appointed Staff Officer (Ia) of XI. Army Corps. In this capacity, he then took part in the 1940 western campaign. On 1 June 1940 Sauberzweig was wounded in the south-east of Dunkirk and remained in the Army Corps until 1941.

On 1 June 1941 Sauberzweig was appointed as commander of the Wehrmacht 466th Infantry Regiment which he led on the Eastern Front. On 18 August 1941, he was hospitalised due to an injury that blinded him in one eye. After his recovery, he was appointed in early October 1941 as commander of the 306th Infantry Regiment in the German army in occupied France. He was then employed by Army Group North in the occupied Soviet Union as a staff training leader. On 1 February 1942, he was promoted to Oberst (colonel). On 1 May 1942, he was appointed commander of the Infantry Replacement Regiment 131 in Brno, Moravia. From 1 November 1942 Sauberzweig was the Wehrmacht chief of staff in the inspection of the education and training system.

=== Waffen-SS ===
On 1 August 1943, Sauberzweig transferred to the Waffen-SS and was appointed SS-Oberführer. A week later he was placed in command of the nascent Kroatische-SS-Freiwilligen-Division (Croatian SS Volunteer Division, later called the 13th Waffen Mountain Division of the SS Handschar (1st Croatian)). Sauberzweig arrived in Mende, Lozère, France, to assume command from the Austrian Oberführer Herbert von Obwurzer on 9 August 1943.

Two weeks later Sauberzweig prepared a character sketch of the average Bosnian volunteer: "The Bosnian is a very good soldier. His strength lies in the use of terrain and in close combat." He was therefore very distressed by the Villefranche-de-Rouergue mutiny on 17 September, and immediately ordered the disarming of all non-German personnel and martial law. The local Mayor was arrested during the fracas but Sauberzweig ordered his prompt release. Ultimately 825 "dark elements" as Sauberzweig called them, were removed from the Division permanently. However, this and a falling off in recruitment led to staff problems, and he was constantly complaining to the SS personnel office in Berlin about his urgent need for battalion commanders. On 1 October 1943, Karl-Gustav Sauberzweig was promoted to the rank of SS-Brigadeführer and Generalmajor of the Waffen-SS.

In October 1943, after the division relocated to Neuhammer, Germany, to complete training, Sauberzweig lectured the men during the Bajram (Eid al Fitr) festivities: "This is the first feast that the entire division will observe together. We want to observe it as a sign that we have grown together into a community of prosperity." Reichsführer-SS Heinrich Himmler visited the division on 21 November 1943 and again over 11 and 12 January 1944. At the November inspection, Sauberzweig instructed the division's Albanian recruits and parts of the artillery to conduct a special exercise to demonstrate their efficiency and proficiency. He also twice hosted Mohammad Amin al-Husayni, the Grand Mufti of Jerusalem, at Neuhammer.

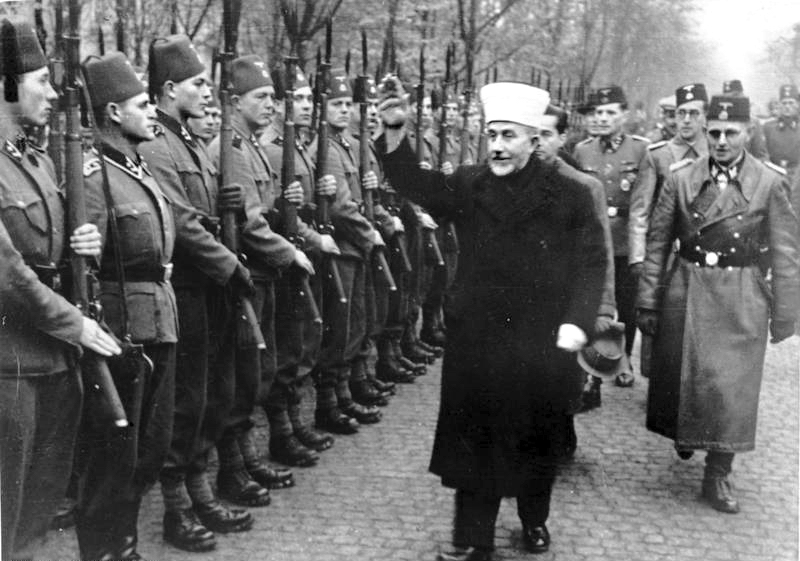
November 1943: The Mufti of Jerusalem inspects Bosnian volunteers; Sauberzweig on right.

Curiously, considering the Division's supposedly Islamic basis, Sauberzweig sent a handwritten Christmas greeting to Himmler at the end of 1943: "Reichsführer! The officers, NCOs, and men of the Muslim Division send you, Reichsführer, their greetings at Yuletide – the German Christmas!"

=== Bosnia-Herzegovina ===
In mid-February 1944 the Handschar Division was sent back to Bosnia-Herzegovina via train. Sauberzweig drove ahead with his personal orderly and reported to the V SS Mountain Corps on 23 February at Mostar, Herzegovina. Later, during Operation Sava in Bosnia, he addressed the men: "We have now reached the Bosnian frontier and will (soon) begin the march into the homeland. I was recently able to travel throughout almost all of Bosnia. What I saw shocked me. The fields lay uncultivated, the villages burned out and destroyed... Misery reigns in the refugee camps."

On 7 March the division celebrated the Mawlid, birthday of Muhammad. According to Lepre: "Sauberzweig ordered that large celebrations be organized in the units by commanders and imams. These included religious rites, lectures, and the distribution of special rations."

Three days later they launched their first real combat mission – Operation Wegweiser. From 10 to 13 March 1944, the Handschar Division entered the Syrmia region of eastern Croatia, held by Partisans who were threatening the Zagreb-Belgrade railway.

On 15 March the Handschar Division formally re-entered Bosnia during Operation Sava and found the land completely devastated. The Croatian Ustaše administration had melted away and there was neither security nor any functioning economy. Sauberzweig took the initiative to restore order and drafted the "Guidelines for the Liberation of Bosnia", focused on bringing back law and order, and above all to secure food supplies by confiscating it from the population.

The historian George Lepre wrote: "It is clear that through this directive, Sauberzweig foresaw his division taking complete control of the region. His mandate sought to turn northeastern Bosnia into an SS vassal state, and this infuriated the Pavelić regime." Opposition from Zagreb and the Reich Foreign office meant that, ironically, much of Sauberzweig's economic and social welfare proposals were rescinded or undermined, while the more draconian aspects (particularly food requisition) remained in place. Himmler however did create an independent "SS and Police Organization Staff" on 17 April to restore order in the area under Dr. Richard Wagner.

Given the glowing accounts of Sauberzweig's men and their performance in the first two months, Himmler decided to create a second Bosnian Muslim Division (23rd Waffen Mountain Division of the SS Kama or just "Kama") in June 1944 and promoted Sauberzweig to the administration of the proposed IX Waffen-Gebirgs Korps der SS (Kroatisches). On 19 June 1944 Sauberzweig formally handed over command of Handschar to SS-Brigadeführer Desiderius Hampel and then travelled to Berlin to report in person to Himmler. On 21 June he was formally promoted to the rank of SS-Gruppenführer und Generalleutnant der Waffen SS (Group Leader and General Lieutenant of the Waffen-SS).

In his formal written report submitted to Himmler, dated 22 June, Sauberzweig stated: “When the division first went into action, it was not fully combat-ready. The infantry regiment possessed only six line companies apiece. The transfer of the Albanians (to the “Skanderbeg” Division), officers and NCOs included, made the situation worse.” Himmler blamed the poor performance of the 13th Waffen Mountain Division of the SS Handschar (1st Croatian) over August–September–October 1944 on Sauberzweig and placed him "in reserve" of the SS Führungshauptamt (SS Main Operational Office). Sauberzweig subsequently underwent a psychological assessment which observed that he had a "distinct state of nervous excitability tending [...] towards psychosis."

=== Return to the Wehrmacht ===
In January 1945 Sauberzweig returned to the Wehrmacht as Generalleutnant (major general) and commanded "a corps within Army Group H in northern Germany."

=== Surrender and suicide ===
Sauberzweig surrendered to the Western Allies and on 26 September 1946 submitted a written report of his experiences with the 13th Waffen Mountain Division of the SS Handschar (1st Croatian) whilst interned by the British army at Preetz, Schleswig-Holstein. This unpublished manuscript later became an important document of the division's history. On 20 October 1946 Sauberzweig committed suicide in Civil Internment Camp No. 6 (formerly Neuengamme concentration camp) by swallowing poison rather than face extradition and trial in Yugoslavia.

His son, Professor Dr. Dieter Sauberzweig, became a prominent Kulturpolitiker or commentator on German political culture.

Opinions on Sauberzweig and his administration of the Handschar division vary greatly. The lifelong professional military careerist SS-Obergruppenführer Artur Phleps praised them both: "Regarding the 13th Division, I can only report that it has performed flawlessly."

== See also ==
- List SS-Gruppenführer

== Dates of rank ==
Sauberzweig's Ranks
Date	Rank
28 September 1916	Fahnenjunker (officer cadet)
17 May 1917	Leutnant ohne Patent (lieutenant without Commission)
May 1919	Leutnant (lieutenant)
April 1925	Oberleutnant (senior lieutenant)
April 1933	Hauptmann (captain)
1 October 1936	Major
1 March 1938	Oberstleutnant (lieutenant colonel)
1 February 1942	Oberst (colonel)
1 August 1943	SS-Oberführer (senior colonel)
1 October 1943	SS-Brigadeführer and Generalmajor of the Waffen-SS (brigadier)
21 June 1944	SS-Gruppenführer and Generalleutnant of the Waffen-SS (major general)
January 1945	Generalleutnant (major general) (Wehrmacht)
