= Ferid Džanić =

- Born: 1918; Bihać, Condominium of Bosnia and Herzegovina, Austria-Hungary
- Died: 17 September 1943 (aged 24–25) Villefranche-de-Rouergue, France
- Rank: Lieutenant, duty officer

Ferid Džanić (1918 – 17 September 1943) was a Bosniak soldier during World War II. A member of the SS Handschar Division, he was one of the leaders of an unsuccessful anti-German mutiny in Villefranche-de-Rouergue, in which he was killed.

== Early life ==
Džanić was born to a Bosniak family in the Bosnian city of Bihać in 1918, around the time World War I came to an end.

== Army history ==
Džanić served as an officer cadet in the Royal Yugoslav Army for a short time before joining the 8th Krajina Brigade of the Yugoslav Partisans to escape imprisonment in autumn 1942. While patrolling in western Bosnia in early 1943, Džanić was captured by the Germans during the Fourth Enemy Offensive and incarcerated in a prison camp outside Sarajevo. He was only released when he agreed to volunteer to become a soldier in the German-aligned Handžar division, where he became a lieutenant and later a battalion duty officer.

== Death ==
In July 1943, Džanic began forming an anti-German "rebel cell" within the Handžar division while they were stationed in Germany. During their stint in Germany, Džanić first met Božo Jelenek, who would become a fellow ringleader in the "rebel cell". The division was transferred to southern France in August 1943 where a third ringleader, teenager Nikola Vukelić, joined the group. SS Mountain Pioneer Battalion 13, the unit of the Handžar's that the rebel ringleaders were from, was stationed in the French commune Villefranche-de-Rouergue.

The Bosniak and Croat soldiers of the Division endured harsh discipline, forced labour and physical abuse by their German superiors and on 7 September 1943, their living quarters were moved to the barracks while the German officers were quartered in a hotel in the town. News of German and Chetnik atrocities against the Bosnian Muslim population in Bosnia made its way to the soldiers in France. All that coupled with anger about the plan to have the division transferred back to Germany, and evidently eventually to Russia, led to the anti-German rebellion the Villefranche-de-Rouergue uprising, which began just after midnight on 17 September 1943 and ended with five German soldiers and multiple Handschar dead. Around 800 surviving Handžars were sent to Dachau concentration camp after the battle. Among the dead was 25-year-old Džanić.
