= Deutsches Institut für Urbanistik =

German Institute of Urban Affairs

- Abbreviation: difu
- Formation: February 15, 1973; 53 years ago
- Type: Think tank
- Headquarters: Zimmerstr. 13-15; 10969 Berlin; Germany
- Location(s): Berlin, Germany Cologne, Germany (branch)
- Director: Jochen Monstadt
- CEO: Katherine Kaplan
- Website: difu.de

The Deutsches Institut für Urbanistik (English: German Institute of Urban Affairs) is a German think tank. It conducts research on urban development in Germany and in other German-speaking countries or regions.

The institute was founded by the German Association of Cities on 15 February 1973, and was named on 1 October 1973. It is headquartered in Berlin, runs a branch in Cologne and is structured as a company with limited liability.

== Leaders ==
- 1973–1978: Wolfgang Haus
- 1978–1981: Erika Spiegel
- 1981–1992: Dieter Sauberzweig
- 1992–2006: Heinrich Mäding
- 2006–2013: Klaus J. Beckmann
- 2013–2018: Martin zur Nedden
- 2018–2026: Carsten Kühl
- 2026–present: Jochen Monstadt
