= Battle of Batina =

1944 battle during World War II

- Part of the Yugoslav and Syrmian fronts of World War II
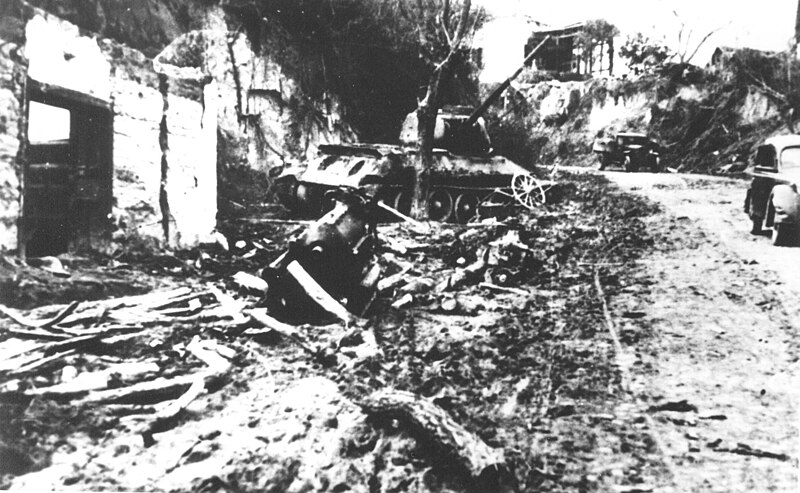
- Photograph of destroyed buildings in Batina after the battle captured by the 1st Vojvodinian Brigade on 30 November 1944.
Date	11–29 November 1944
Location	Batina, Hungarian-occupied Yugoslavia
Result	Allied victory

Belligerents
Soviet Union; Yugoslavia	Germany (Kingdom of Hungary (1920–1946)) Hungary

Commanders and leaders
(Soviet Union) Mikhail Sharokhin	(Nazi Germany) Hellmuth Felmy

Units involved
(Soviet Union) 57th Army; 51st Partisan Division	(Nazi Germany) 68th Army Corps; Brandenburgers; 31st SS Division; 44th Infantry Division

Casualties and losses
1,237 soldiers killed 648 partisans killed	2,000 dead and wounded

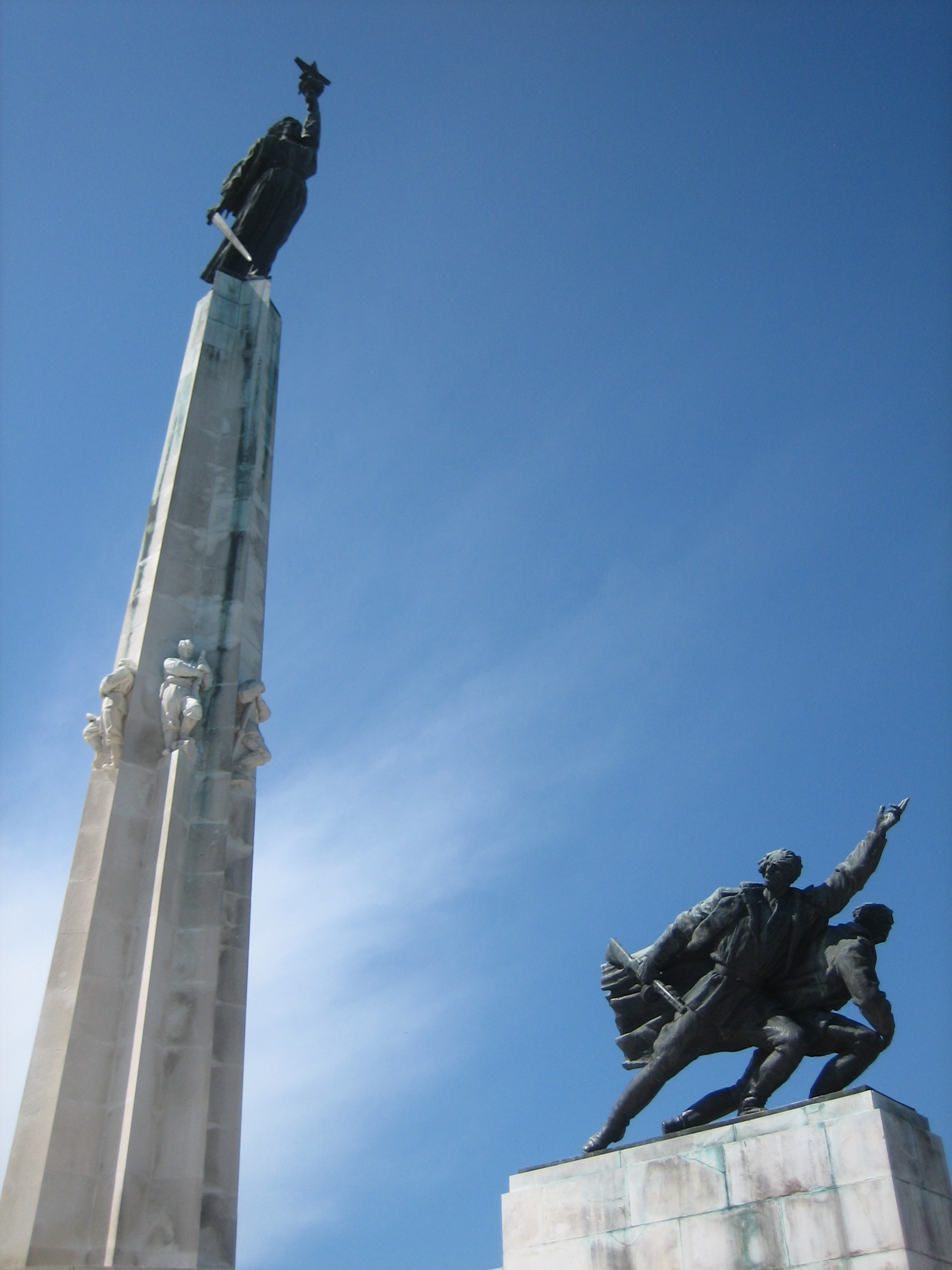
Monument to the Battle of Batina in Batina by Antun Augustinčić.

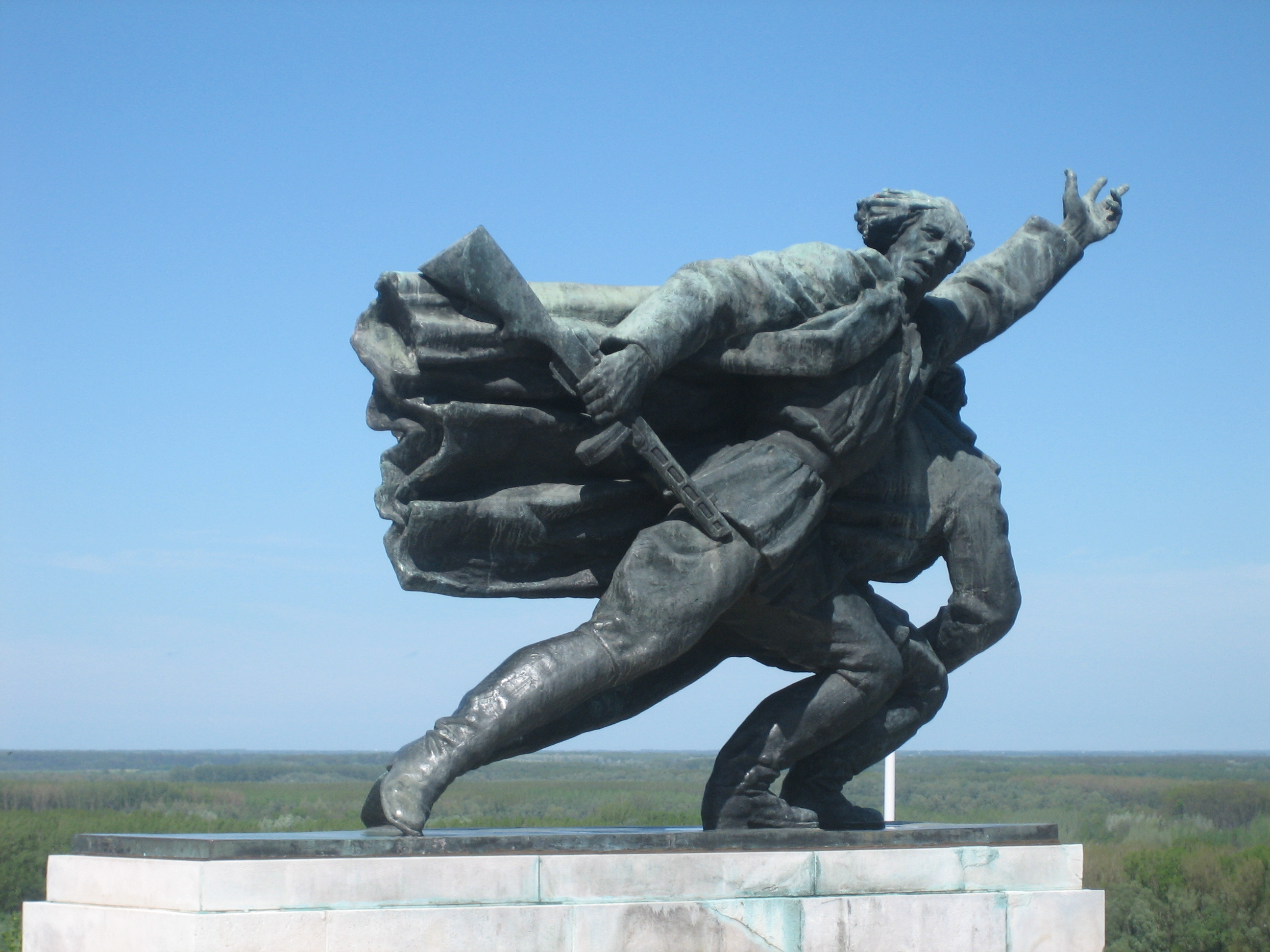
Detail from the Batina monument which represents Yugoslav partisan going to battle

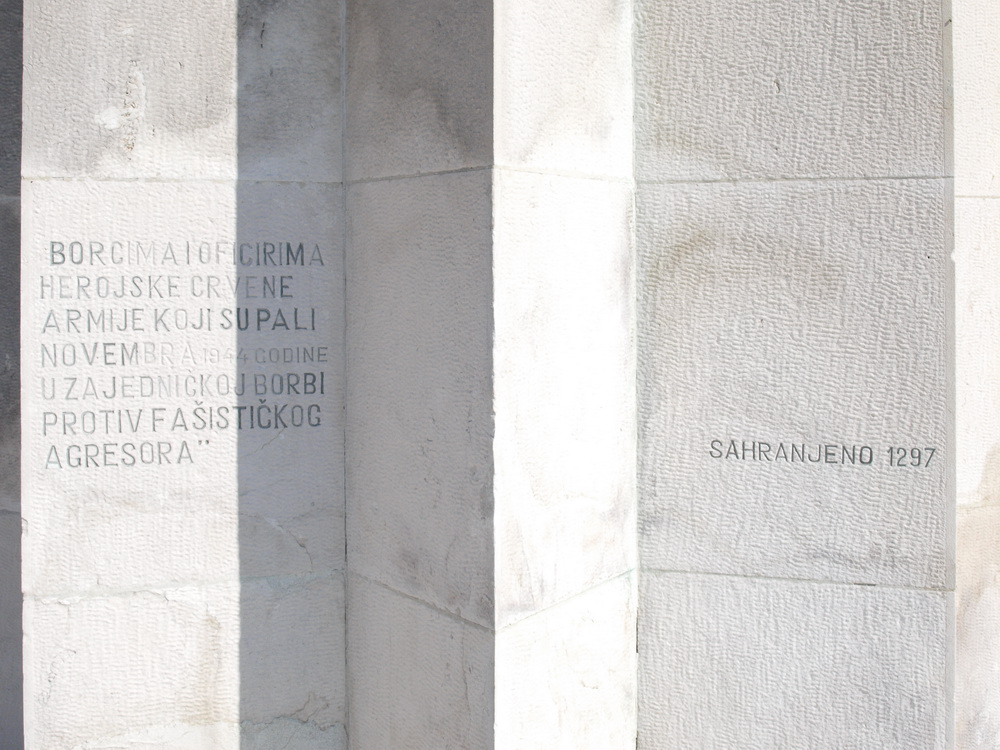
Inscription: "(Erected in honor of) soldiers and officers of the heroic Red Army who fell in November 1944 in a battle against fascist aggressors. 1297 buried".

The Battle of Batina or Batina Operation (Serbo-Croatian: Bitka kod Batine) was fought on the Syrmian Front of the Second World War between the units of the Red Army and the Yugoslav Partisans against the Wehrmacht and their allies. The battle took place from 11 to 29 November 1944 near the village of Batina in Baranja, on the right bank of the Danube River. According to some estimates, the Battle of Batina was the biggest battle by the number of participants, the intensity of fighting, and the strategic importance that occurred during World War II in Yugoslavia.

== Context ==
After the liberation of Belgrade and Vojvodina, the 57th Army, under the command of General Mikhail Sharokhin, supported by the 51st Vojvodina Division under the command of Lieutenant Colonel Sreten Savić, reached to the left bank of the Danube river and took over its defense from Baja to Bačka Palanka. To facilitate further operations of the Red Army towards Vienna and Budapest, the 51st Partisan division crossed the left bank of the Drava river. These units had the task to take over bridges and provide the transfer of other units across the Danube river. In the headquarters of the 57th Army in Srbobran, Yugoslav National Liberation Army's general Kosta Nađ and the 3rd Ukrainian Front commander Marshal Fyodor Tolbukhin, agreed to choose the village of Batina as the point for crossing the Danube river. As a backup area, they selected the area to the west of Apatin. Both commanders thought that, due to the extremely unfavorable and inaccessible terrain near Batina (wide and flooded rivers, wetlands and almost perpendicular cliffs), the enemy wouldn't expect an attack on this part of the river.

== German forces ==
In early November 1944, the right bank of the Danube river was defended by a number of German strongholds, stretching between the villages of Duboševica and Čarne. They were managed by forces of the 68th Army Corps (General of Aviation Hellmuth Felmy) from Army Group F, under the command of Marshal Maximilian von Weichs.

It was composed of parts of the German 31st SS and Brandenburg divisions, four Hungarian and three battalions, several police battalions, 25 artillery batteries and 30 tanks.

Stronger reserves were located south of Osijek and at Pécs. In anticipation of new attacks, the German command was constantly bringing new units into the area. At the beginning of the Battle of Batina, German forces had about 30,000 troops, a number which increased to more than 60,000 at the end of the battle.

== Red Army and National Liberation Army forces ==
Forces of the Soviet Army that participated in the Battle of Batina was the 57th Army, composed of the

- 19th Motor Rifle Division
- 74th Rifle Division
- 113th Rifle Division
- 233rd Rifle Division
- 236th Rifle Division
- 20th Guards Rifle Division
- 73rd Guards Rifle Division
- 10th Guards Airborne Division
- 32nd Guards Mechanized Brigade

Forces of the National Liberation Army that participated in the Battle of Batina were: the

- 51st division (7th, 8th and 12th Vojvodina Brigade) and
- 12th Corps as reinforcements which were made out of the operational reserves in Sombor :
  - 16th Division (from 17 November),
  - 36th Division (after 17 November).

== Objectives and results ==
The Allied plan envisioned that the 73rd Guards and 233rd Red Army divisions and the 51st People's Liberation Army's division (without the 8th Brigade) would attack Batina and take it over. They would later extend the bridgehead up to the villages Draž and Zmajevac. The 236th Red Army Division and the 8th Brigade of the 51st Division would attack and take over Zlatna Greda and expand the bridgehead towards the village of Zmajevac and Kneževi Vinogradi.

The battle of Batina lasted from 11 to 29 November 1944, when the Allies took the bridgeheads near Batina and Apatin. In the decisive fight, the German forces tried to force the Red Army and the NLA back to the Danube with several counterattacks, in particular from 12 to 15 November. All the counterattacks, however, were rejected, and the Germans forces in the territory between the Danube and Drava rivers were substantially destroyed. Baranja was liberated as well. These actions created favorable conditions for the subsequent Red Army's offensive towards Vienna and Budapest, while the whole German front on the Syrmian Front was weakened.

== Course of the battle ==
The First Recon Group of the 12th Vojvodina brigade and the 233rd divisions of the Red Army (commanded by Colonel Sidorenko) managed to cross the Danube on the night of 9–10 November 1944 unnoticed. They approached the enemy positions to a few meters and waited there for the main units to arrive, helping them by sending signals. On 11 November, just before dawn, two battalions of the Red Army's 233rd Division and one battalion of the 12th Brigade, with the strong support of Soviet artillery, transferred across the Danube with the fishing boats to an area near Batina, and then launched an attack on the German positions. They first attacked Draž, trig 205 and Zmajevac, in front of which they were stopped.

In the afternoon of 11 November, and on the night of 11–12 November, other battalions of the 12th Brigade were transferred across the Danube and joined those units that had been transferred in the morning. On 12 November, around noon, the 31st SS Volunteer Grenadier Division, supported by tanks and 20 airplanes, started a counter-attack and managed to push the 12th brigade and 233rd battalion division to the western edge of Batina by nightfall. The fighting continued on 13 November, when the 2nd Battalion of the 7th Brigade was transferred across the Danube to help the Red Army and NLA forces there.

On the next day, the Germans continued to attack in a very tough fight and managed to push troops to the eastern part of Batina. In the next two days, heavy street fighting took place in the streets of Batina. The Soviet troops and the 51st division were suppressed on 15 November. In this critical moment, the whole Red Army's 73rd Guards Division, and, on the night of 15–16 November, other battalions of the 7th Brigade were also transferred across the river, replacing the exhausted 12th Brigade's battalions.

The bloodiest battles were fought at the Batina train station and Hill 169, known as the "Bloody Hill" (Croatian: Krvava Kota). On 16 November the Red Army and NLA attacked the Nazis with everything they had, eventually pushing the 31st SS Volunteer Grenadier Division to Draž and Zmajevac. Along with the development of the struggle in the direction of Zmajevac and Draž, on 18 November, they crossed the Danube, north of Apatin. The 236th Red Army division and a battalion of the 51st division's 8th brigade headed towards Monjoroš and Tikveš Castle. By 22 November the other troops of the 236th Soviet Division and the 8th Brigade were transferred across the Danube. Next day, in a general strike, the 73rd Guards Division took Zmajevac in conjunction with the 51st Division, while the 8th Brigade, Monjoroš, and the 233rd Division took Draž.

== Sources ==
- Božić, Nikola : "Batinska bitka". Beograd : Rad, 1978. // 568. p. : illustrated; 21 cm //
- Božić, Nikola : "Batinska bitka" [2nd edition] / Kosta Nađ – author of the foreword. Novi Sad : Matica srpska; Muzej socijalističke revolucije Vojvodine, 1990. // 469 p., [16] p. with tables : illustrated.; 25 cm //
- Sreta Savić: 51. VOJVOÐANSKA DIVIZIJA, Vojnoizdavački zavod, Beograd 1974.
- Nikola Božić: SEDMA VOJVOÐANSKA NOU BRIGADA, Vojnoizdavački zavod, Beograd 1984.
- Nikola Božić: ROVOVI I MOSTOBRANI (OSMA VOJVOÐANSKA BRIGADA), Institut za istoriju, Novi Sad 1989.
- Božić, Nikola : "Batina historijski spomenik". Osijek : Međuopćinski odbor SUBNOR-a za Slavoniju i Baranju, 1981. // 112 p. : illustrated; 17 cm. //
- Božić, Nikola : "Sedma vojvođanska NOU brigada". Beograd : Vojnoizdavački zavod, 1984. // 575 p. : illustrated.; 21 cm; Cyrillic; [Biblioteka] Ratna prošlost naroda i narodnosti Jugoslavije : knjiga dvesta šezdeseta : Monografije jedinica NOV i PO Jugoslavije : knjiga dvadeset druga //
- Lazić, Nada : "Baranja : 1941 – 1945." / [foreword Mirko Bošković]. Slavonski Brod : Historijski institut Slavonije i Baranje, 1979. // 350 p.; 22 cm //
- Petrov, Marinko : "U redovima VII vojvođanske : (doživljaji brigadnog kurira)". Novi Sad : Odbor VII vojvođanske NOU brigade, 1974. // 251 p. : illustrated; 20 cm //
- Petrov, Marinko : "Na baranjskom ratištu : (1944–1945)". Beli Manastir : Savez udruženja boraca Narodnooslobodilačkog rata, Opštinski odbor Beli Manastir; Darda : SOUR Belje, Novi Sad, 1982. // 271 p. : illustrated; 20 cm //
- Dimitrije Trifunović: "Batina", in: Vojna enciklopedija, 1958.
- Sreta Savić: "Batina u NOR-u", in: Encyclopedia of Yugoslavia, 1980.
- Nataša Mataušić (author of the exhibition and catalog): "Batinska bitka : studeni 1944. : katalog izložbe". Zagreb : Ministarstvo kulture Republike Hrvatske; Batina : Memorijalni kompleks Batinska bitka, V. 2001.
