= 16th Division (Yugoslav Partisans) =

16th Vojvodina Division
- Flag of Democratic Federal Yugoslavia (used by the Partisans)
- Country: Democratic Federal Yugoslavia
- Branch: Yugoslav Partisan Army
- Type: infantry
- Size: division
- Part of: Partisan 3rd Corps; Partisan 12th Corps; Partisan 3rd Army
- Engagements: World War II in Yugoslavia * Operation Osterei * Operation Maiglöckchen * Operation Vollmond * Operation Heiderose * Belgrade Offensive * Battle of Batina * Syrmian Front * Operation Wehrwolf (Yugoslavia)

Commanders
- Notable commanders: Danilo Lekić

The 16th Vojvodina Division (Serbo-Croatian Latin: Šesnaesta vojvođanska divizija) was a Yugoslav Partisan division that fought against Nazi Germany, the Independent State of Croatia (NDH) and Chetniks in occupied Democratic Federal Yugoslavia during World War II.

When it was created, the 16th Vojvodina Division consisted of mostly Serbs recruited from Hungarian–occupied Bačka. It constituted the first, second, and third Vojvodinian Brigades and had about 3,000 units when it was formed. By 1941, the Partisan rank-and-file was still predominantly Serbian. The Partisans initial successes included the liberation of the area that surrounded the Serbian town of Užice.

As part of the Partisan 3rd Corps then Partisan 12th Corps, it spent most of 1944 engaged in hard fighting against the 13th Waffen Mountain Division of the SS Handschar (1st Croatian) in eastern Bosnia. The division participated in the Seventh Offensive from March to June 1944.

The division's later conflict with the Chetniks, which grew into a civil war, was rooted on the dispute between the pro-Communist and the nationalist wings of the Serb rebellion.

The Division also participated in the Battle of Batina (November 1944).
