= 3rd Army (Yugoslav Partisans) =

The 3rd Army of the Yugoslav Partisans was a Partisan army that operated in Yugoslavia during the last months of the Second World War.

The Army was created on 1 January 1945, when Chief Commander Marshal Josip Broz Tito converted the guerilla National Liberation Army and Partisan Detachments of Yugoslavia in a more regular Yugoslav Army.

== History ==
As commander was named General lieutenant Kosta Nađ, as Political Commissioner Branko Petričević, and as Chief of staff, Vukašin Subotić.
The Army was formed from the units of the General Staff Vojvodina and the 12th Corps (16th, 36th and 51st Vojvodina divisions). Later the 12th Slavonian, 17th Eastern Bosnian, 32nd Zagorje, 33rd Croatian and 40th Slavonian divisions were added.

Until April 1945, the 3rd Army held positions on the Syrmian Front from Drava to Vukovar and fought on the Virovitica bridgehead, on the left bank of the Drava River, in the vicinity of Slavonski Požega, near Daruvar and on other places.
In the final offensive for the liberation of Yugoslavia in April-May 1945, it liberated a large part of Slavonia, Croatia, Hrvatsko Zagorje and Slovenia. By the end of the war, it was operating in the northeastern part of Slovenia (Ptuj, Maribor). Its units, together with forces from the 4th Army, surrounded a 30,000 strong mixed Axis column containing Germans, Ustashi, Home Guard and Montenegrin Chetniks, and forced it to capitulate after fierce fighting in the Battle of Poljana on May 14-15, a week after the armistice.

== Sources ==
- This is a translation of the article in the Slovenian Wikipedia, 3. armada (NOVJ).
