= 12th Corps (Yugoslav Partisans) =

- Flag of Democratic Federal Yugoslavia (used by the Partisans)
- Active: 1944–1945
- Disbanded: 28 March 1945
- Country: Yugoslavia
- Branch: Yugoslav Partisan Army
- Type: Infantry
- Size: Corps
- Part of: 3rd Army
- Engagements: World War II in Yugoslavia * Operation Heiderose * Operation Hackfleisch * Battle of Batina * Belgrade Offensive

Commanders
- Notable commanders: Danilo Lekić

The 12th Corps (Serbo-Croatian Latin: 12. Korpus) was a corps of the Yugoslav Partisans that fought against the Germans, Independent State of Croatia (NDH) and Chetniks in occupied Democratic Federal Yugoslavia during World War II.

It was formed on 1 July 1944 with the 16th Vojvodina Division and 36th Vojvodina Division and subsequently took the 51st Vojvodina Division under command. It was subordinated to the Partisan 3rd Army on 1 January 1945. The 12th Corps spent the latter half of 1944 engaged in hard fighting against the 13th Waffen Mountain Division of the SS Handschar (1st Croatian) in eastern Bosnia.

The Corps also participated in the Belgrade Offensive (October 1944) and Battle of Batina (November 1944).
