= Velino Selo =

Velino Selo Велино Село (Serbian)
- Village (Selo)
- Location within Republika Srpska Location within Bosnia and Herzegovina
- Coordinates: 44°52′55″N 19°18′12″E
- Country: Bosnia and Herzegovina
- Municipality: Bijeljina
- Time zone: UTC+1 (CET)
  - Summer (DST): UTC+2 (CEST)

Velino Selo (Serbian Cyrillic: Велино Село) is a village in the municipality of Bijeljina, Republika Srpska, Bosnia and Herzegovina.

== Geography ==
The village is located on the border of Bosnia and Herzegovina with Serbia, on the banks of the Sava, a right tributary of the Danube.

== History ==
During the May 2014 historic storm and flooding that hit the region, the river Sava overflowed and "sank" the entire village of Velino Selo.
