= Abdulah Muhasilović =

Bosnian Army Imam (1898 – unknown)

- Born: 1898; Sarajevo, Condominium of Bosnia and Herzegovina, Austria-Hungary
- Died: Tuzla, Bosnia and Herzegovina
- Military career
- Allegiance: Bosnia
- Branch: Waffen SS
- Rank: Imam
- Unit: Handschar

Abdulah Muhasilović (1898 – unknown) was a Bosnian army chaplain best known for his involvement in the 13th Waffen-SS Division "Handschar".

Born in 1898, the son of Bajro Muhasilović, he was raised in Sarajevo. Muhasilović joined the nascent division early on in the recruitment stage in June 1943 and was quickly appointed senior Imam to the entire division as he was comparatively the oldest of all the young ulama who signed up. His tasks included supervising the younger imams and serving as spiritual leader of the divisional headquarters Stabsjäger Kompanie (staff security company).

In July 1943 he and several other Bosnian Ulama in the Handschar attended an "Imam Training Course" in Berlin organised by SS Obergruppenführer Gottlob Berger. Zvonimir Bernwald (b. 1924), an ethnic German (Volksdeutscher) and interpreter for the division, described Abdulah Muhasilović as a "skirt-chaser".

Later in 1943, training at Neuhammer, Imam Muhasilović gave an important speech during festivities to mark Bajram: "The world's Muslims are engaged in a terrible life-and-death struggle." He appealed to the men to prepare for conflict with Communism in their "beloved Bosnia".

Abdulah Muhasilović was later judged to be a "complete failure." On 21 October 1944 he led a mutiny in Cerna, Croatia he and over 100 Bosnian men simply walked away with their weapons towards Bosnia. They stopped for a while in Brčko and then joined 500 other deserters and surrendered to the Partisan XVIII Croatian Brigade in the Maoča - Rahić area.

His fate after the war is unclear. There are strong indications that he was executed in 1945 by the Ustaša forces of Maks Luburić.

== Literature ==
- Lepre, George, “Himmler’s Bosnian Division; The Waffen-SS Handschar Division 1943-1945” - 1997. ISBN 0-7643-0134-9
- Redzic, Enver, “Muslimansko Autonomastvo I 13. SS Divizija". Sarajevo: Svjetlost, 1987.
