= Villefranche-de-Rouergue =

Subprefecture and commune in Occitanie, France

Villefranche-de-Rouergue Vilafranca de Roergue (Occitan)
- Subprefecture and commune
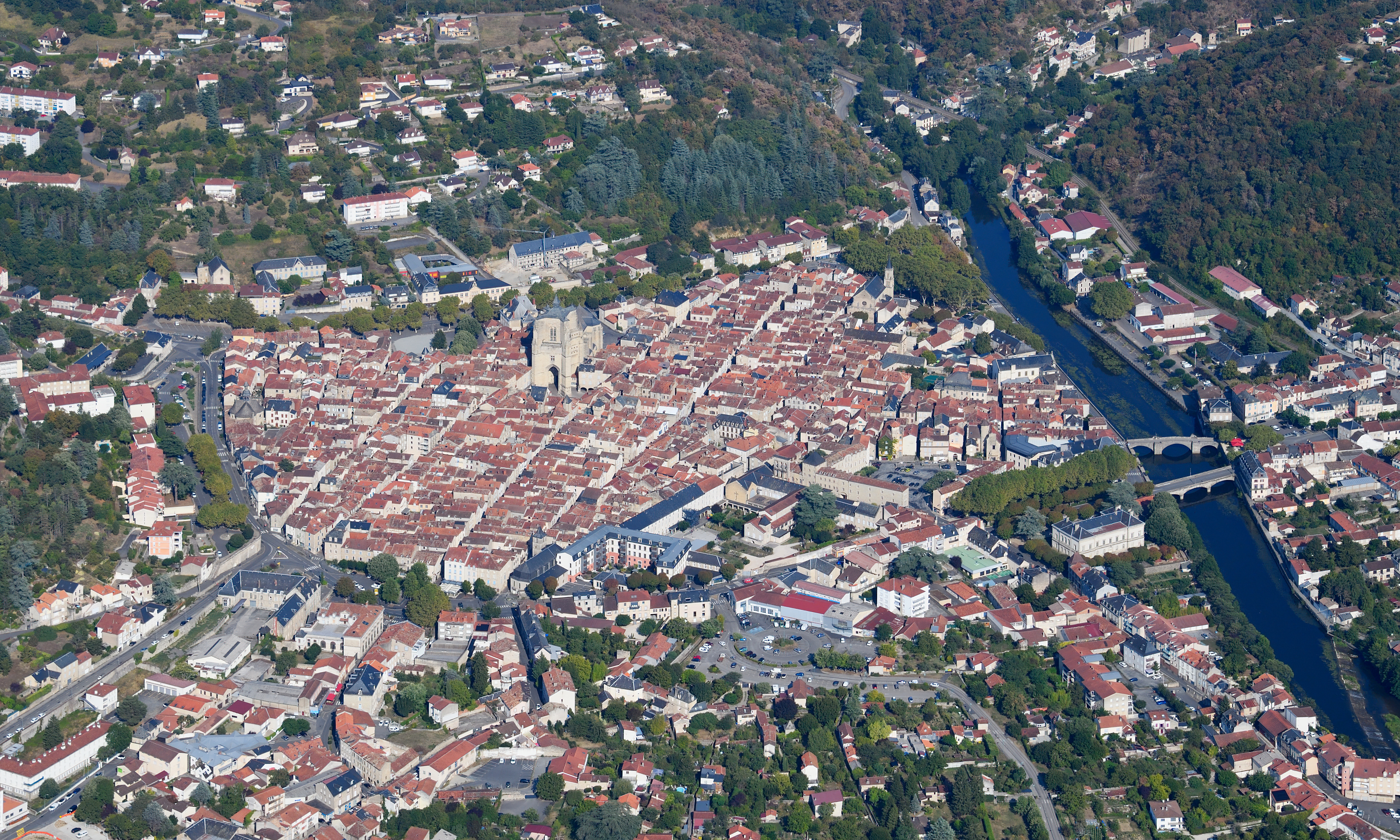
- An aerial view of Villefranche-de-Rouergue

- Coat of arms
- Location of Villefranche-de-Rouergue
- Location within France Location within Occitanie
- Coordinates: 44°21′12″N 2°02′06″E
- Country: France
- Region: Occitania
- Department: Aveyron
- Arrondissement: Villefranche-de-Rouergue
- Canton: Villefranche-de-Rouergue

Government
  - Mayor (2020–2026): Jean-Sébastien Orcibal
- Area^{1}: 45.85 km^{2} (17.70 sq mi)
- Elevation: 290 m (950 ft)
- Highest elevation: 544 m (1,785 ft)
- Lowest elevation: 237 m (778 ft)
- Population (2023): 11,271
  - Density: 245.8/km^{2} (636.7/sq mi)
- Time zone: UTC+01:00 (CET)
  - Summer (DST): UTC+02:00 (CEST)
- INSEE/Postal code: 12300 /12200
- ^{1} French Land Register data, which excludes lakes, ponds, glaciers > 1 km^{2} (0.386 sq mi or 247 acres) and river estuaries.

Villefranche-de-Rouergue (French: [vilfʁɑ̃ʃ də ʁwɛʁɡ]; often known as Rouergue (Languedocien: Vilafranca de Roergue [ˌbilɔˈfɾaŋkɔ ðe ˈrweɾɣe]) is a commune in the Aveyron department in southern France. Villefranche-de-Rouergue station has rail connections to Toulouse, Figeac and Aurillac.

== History ==
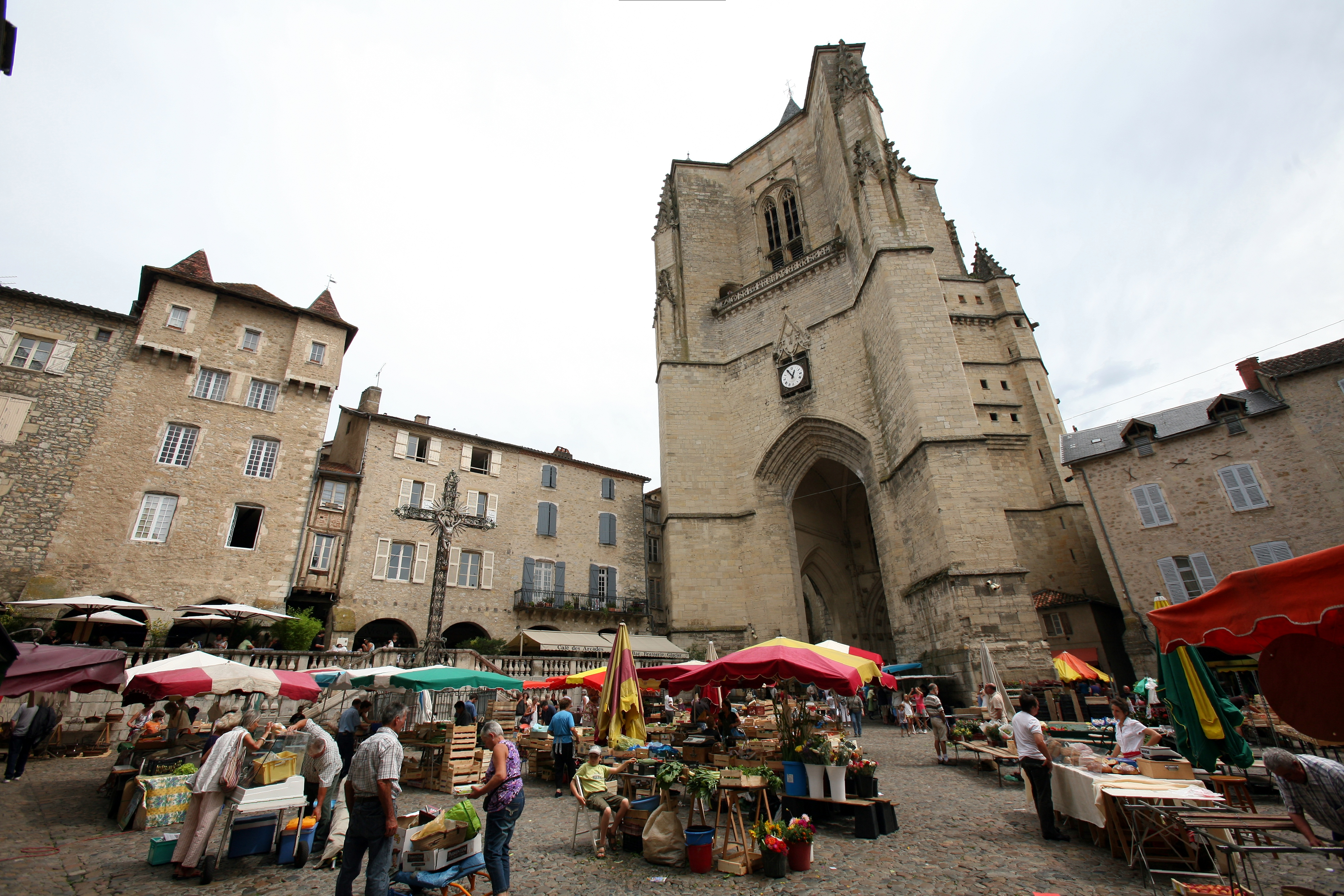
Marketplace on Place Notre-Dame

At the end of the Albigensian Crusade from the northern "barons" against the southern Occitania on a religious pretext (fighting the Cathar heresy), the count of Toulouse was defeated and concluded the Treaty of Paris in 1229. With this, the Count gave the Rouergue county to his daughter. She married Alphonse de Poitiers, brother of Saint Louis, King of France. Alphonse founded Villefranche on the place of an old village called La Peyrade in 1252.

In 1348 it was so flourishing that sumptuary laws were passed. Soon afterwards the town fell into the hands of Edward the Black Prince, but was the first place in Guyenne to rise against the English. New privileges were granted to the town by Charles V, but these were taken away by Louis XI.

In 1588 the inhabitants repulsed the forces of the Hanseatic League, and afterwards murdered a governor sent by Henry IV. The town was ravaged by plague in 1463, 1558 and 1628, and in 1643 a revolt was cruelly repressed. During World War II, while occupied by Nazi Germany, Villefranche received a large 13th Waffen SS Handschar (1st Croatian) division. Led by Ferid Džanić, Eduard Matutinović, Božo Jelinek and Nikola Vukelić, one battalion staged a rebellion against the Nazis on 17 September 1943, (Villefranche-de-Rouergue uprising) but were soon suppressed and mostly executed on site. The few that escaped inspired the French Resistance in Aveyron that had not been formed until then. After the war, an avenue in Villefranche was named Avenue des Croates (Avenue of the Croats) in honour of the uprising.

== Buildings ==
One of the principal thoroughfares passes beneath the porch of Notre-Dame, the principal church of Villefranche. Notre-Dame was built from 1260 to 1581, the massive tower which surmounts its porch being of late Gothic architecture. The woodwork in the choir dates from the 15th century.

A Carthusian monastery overlooking the town from the left bank of the Aveyron derives much interest from the completeness and fine preservation of its buildings, which date from the 15th century. They include a chapel, a vestibule, a chapter house, a refectory, an exhibition room and two cloisters, the smaller of which is a masterpiece of the late Gothic style.

== Twin towns – sister cities ==
Villefranche-de-Rouergue is twinned with:

- Bihać, Bosnia and Herzegovina
- Pula, Croatia
- Sarzana, Italy

== Population ==
Historical population

Year	Pop.	±% p.a.
1793	8,497	—
1800	9,331	+1.35%
1806	9,283	−0.09%
1821	8,803	−0.35%
1831	9,540	+0.81%
1836	8,738	−1.74%
1841	9,088	+0.79%
1846	9,705	+1.32%
1851	9,613	−0.19%
1856	10,826	+2.41%
1861	10,172	−1.24%
1866	9,719	−0.91%
1872	9,312	−0.71%
1876	10,124	+2.11%
1881	10,366	+0.47%
1886	9,836	−1.04%
1891	9,734	−0.21%
1896	8,426	−2.84%
1901	9,730	+2.92%

Year	Pop.	±% p.a.
1906	8,352	−3.01%
1911	8,439	+0.21%
1921	7,423	−1.27%
1926	7,825	+1.06%
1931	7,908	+0.21%
1936	8,479	+1.40%
1946	9,257	+0.88%
1954	8,676	−0.81%
1962	9,540	+1.19%
1968	10,709	+1.95%
1975	12,284	+1.98%
1982	12,693	+0.47%
1990	12,291	−0.40%
1999	11,919	−0.34%
2007	11,957	+0.04%
2012	11,712	−0.41%
2017	11,867	+0.26%
2023	11,271	−0.86%

Source: EHESS and INSEE (1968–2023)

== Climate ==
Climate data for Villefranche-de-Rouergue, elevation 330 m (1,080 ft), (1991–2020 normals, extremes 1988–present)
Month	Jan	Feb	Mar	Apr	May	Jun	Jul	Aug	Sep	Oct	Nov	Dec	Year
Record high °C (°F)	20.7 (69.3)	24.5 (76.1)	26.8 (80.2)	29.6 (85.3)	34.1 (93.4)	40.8 (105.4)	40.0 (104.0)	43.0 (109.4)	36.1 (97.0)	34.4 (93.9)	24.7 (76.5)	20.0 (68.0)	43.0 (109.4)
Mean daily maximum °C (°F)	8.8 (47.8)	10.3 (50.5)	14.2 (57.6)	17.0 (62.6)	21.1 (70.0)	25.3 (77.5)	28.1 (82.6)	28.1 (82.6)	23.7 (74.7)	18.6 (65.5)	12.6 (54.7)	9.7 (49.5)	18.1 (64.6)
Daily mean °C (°F)	4.9 (40.8)	5.5 (41.9)	8.6 (47.5)	11.2 (52.2)	14.9 (58.8)	18.7 (65.7)	21.0 (69.8)	21.0 (69.8)	17.2 (63.0)	13.6 (56.5)	8.4 (47.1)	5.7 (42.3)	12.6 (54.7)
Mean daily minimum °C (°F)	1.0 (33.8)	0.6 (33.1)	3.1 (37.6)	5.5 (41.9)	8.8 (47.8)	12.1 (53.8)	14.0 (57.2)	13.8 (56.8)	10.6 (51.1)	8.4 (47.1)	4.2 (39.6)	1.6 (34.9)	7.0 (44.6)
Record low °C (°F)	−11.9 (10.6)	−15.5 (4.1)	−12.9 (8.8)	−4.7 (23.5)	−2.1 (28.2)	1.6 (34.9)	5.7 (42.3)	4.2 (39.6)	0.7 (33.3)	−7.0 (19.4)	−11.3 (11.7)	−13.9 (7.0)	−15.5 (4.1)
Average precipitation mm (inches)	74.6 (2.94)	58.9 (2.32)	65.6 (2.58)	93.2 (3.67)	88.4 (3.48)	73.4 (2.89)	48.0 (1.89)	59.8 (2.35)	68.2 (2.69)	74.8 (2.94)	82.1 (3.23)	78.1 (3.07)	865.1 (34.06)
Average precipitation days (≥ 1.0 mm)	11.6	9.9	10.7	11.5	10.4	8.1	6.6	7.2	8.1	9.6	11.9	11.7	117.3
Source: Meteociel

== See also ==
- Villefranche XIII Aveyron
- Émilie de Rodat
- Armand-François Chateauvieux, dramatist and playwright born in Villefranche-de-Rouergue (1770)
- Communes of the Aveyron department
