= 2017 Hamas charter =

Revision of Palestinian Hamas organization's founding document

On 1 May 2017, Palestinian political and military organization Hamas unveiled A Document of General Principles and Policies (Arabic: وثيقة المبادئ والسياسات العامة لحركة حماس), also known as the 2017 Hamas charter, "new charter", or "current" charter. It accepted the idea of a Palestinian state within the 1967 borders, i.e. comprising the West Bank and Gaza Strip only, on the condition that also the Palestinian refugees were allowed to return to their homes, if it is clear this is the consensus of the Palestinians ("a formula of national consensus"); but at the same time this document strove for the "complete liberation of Palestine, from the river to the sea", and did not explicitly recognize Israel. The new charter holds that armed resistance against an occupying power is justified under international law.

While the 1988 Hamas Charter had been widely criticized for its antisemitism, the 2017 document removed the antisemitic language and stated that Hamas' fight was not with Jews as such because of their religion but with the "Zionist project". When asked, Hamas leaders explained that "The original charter has now become a historical document and part of an earlier stage in our evolution. It will remain in the movement's bookshelf as a record of our past." Khaled Mashal stated that the new document reflected "our position for now". However, Hamas fell short of formally repudiating the original 1988 charter. According to an analyst Hamas did not formally revoke the old charter so as to not alienate some of its base members, who it feared might join rival Islamist factions.

Views on the 2017 document varied. While some welcomed it as a sign of pragmatism and increased political maturity, and a potential step on the way to peace, many others dismissed it as a merely cosmetic effort designed to make Hamas sound more palatable while changing nothing about Hamas' underlying aims and methods.

== Presentation ==
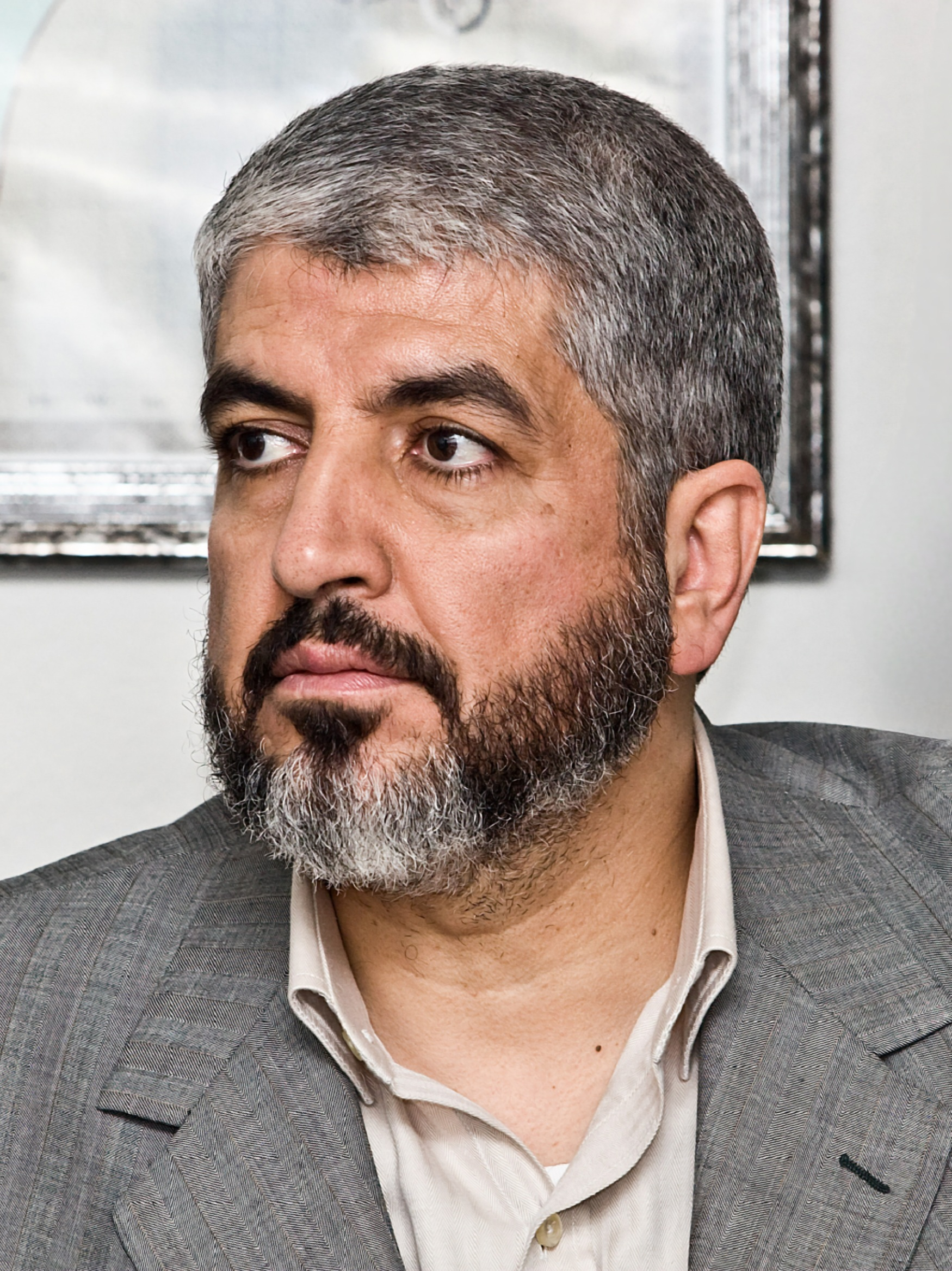
Hamas leader Khaled Mashal presented the new document at a press conference in Doha on 1 May 2017

Hamas leader Khaled Mashal presented the document at a press conference in Doha on 1 May 2017, shortly before being replaced as leader by Ismail Haniyeh. The new document was the result of years of internal discussions; many Hamas members still regarded its text as controversial.

In his presentation, Mashal described the Hamas movement as following a middle way between two poles: extremism (tatarruf or tashaddud) and flexibility (muyu'a, literally: "liquidity"). In comparison to the Hamas Charter of 1988, which was marked by religious rhetoric and utopian ideas, the newer document was characterized by simple and mostly pragmatic political language. It contained a preamble and 42 paragraphs in which Hamas outlined its positions on the fundamental aspects of the Arab–Israeli conflict. The document affirmed the movement's adherence to its founding principles, but also left open gray areas to allow Hamas political room for maneuver in the future. The text was called wathiqa (document) in Arabic which is supposed to be less fixed and binding than mithaq – the term used for the 1988 charter.

In a departure from the tone of the original charter, which presented the fight against Israel as a religious struggle, the new document said that there was a nationalist conflict "with the Zionist project not with the Jews because of their religion". However, the old charter was not explicitly revoked. When asked, Hamas leaders explained: "The original charter has now become a historical document and part of an earlier stage in our evolution. It will remain in the movement's bookshelf as a record of our past." Mashal stated that the new document reflected "our position for now, which means that we are not a rigid ideological organization ... The old charter was a product of its era, 30 years ago. We live in a different world today." Some analysts opined that Hamas did not revoke the old charter so as to not alienate some of its base members, who it feared might join rival Islamist factions. Jean-François Legrain, writing in the Routledge Handbook of Political Islam, said the question of the 1988 charter's repeal having been avoided could only mean that it was not repealed. Only its antisemitic aspects could be considered repealed, Legrain said, as the new document explicitly expressed an entirely different position. Any other provisions in the 1988 charter upon which the new document remained silent could be considered still valid, along with numerous other communiqués and declarations Hamas had published over the preceding three decades.

Hamas also declared its willingness to support any peace agreement accepted in a popular referendum and distanced itself from all foreign Islamic organisations, including the Muslim Brotherhood, which, having lost power in Egypt, had come to be classed as a terrorist organization there. The Brotherhood is not even mentioned by name in the new document, although there are still traceable echoes of their ideology.

== Contents ==
The document was published in Arabic and English. There are some slight differences between the two language versions, mainly involving differences in nuance and connotation.

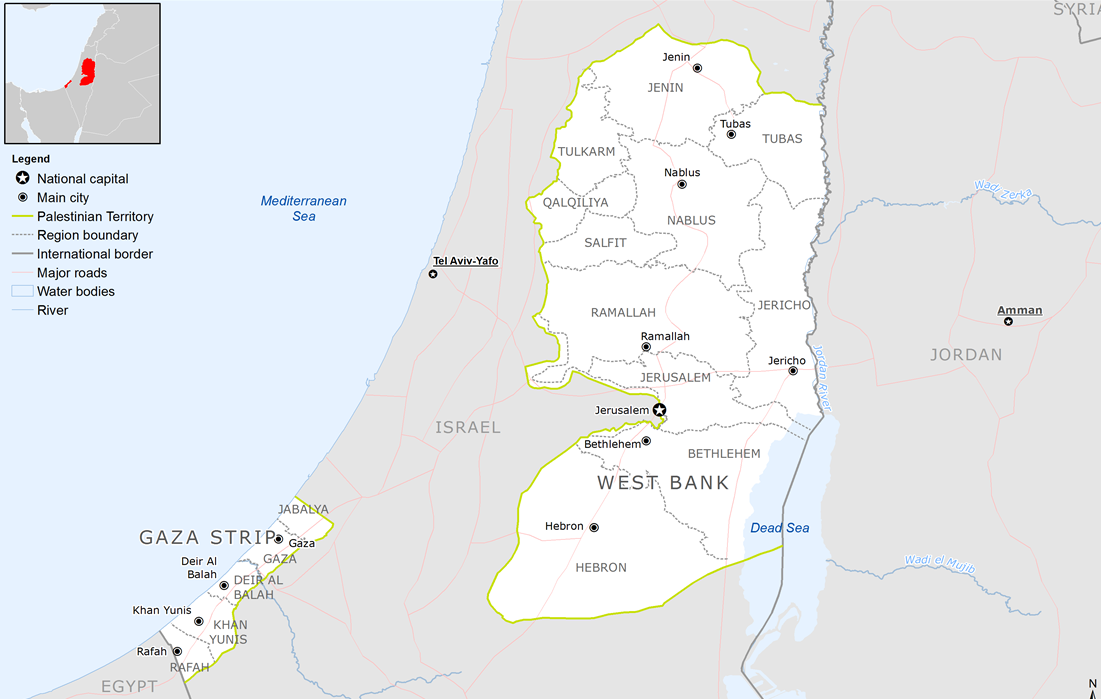
The Charter was notable for accepting a Palestinian state within the 1967 borders without, however, recognizing Israel.

=== Preamble ===
The preamble of the document states that Palestine is "the land of the Arab Palestinian people, from it they originate, to it they adhere and belong, and about it they reach out and communicate." This differs from the 1988 charter in which Palestine is described as an "Islamic endowment" (waqf) belonging to the entire Muslim nation. Rhetorically, however, the new document also affirms the Islamic importance of Palestine as "the spirit of the Ummah and its central cause; it is the soul of humanity and its living conscience."

=== Paragraphs 1–42 ===
The first paragraph describes Hamas as a nationalist liberation and resistance movement with Islam as its "frame of reference". Under the heading "The Land of Palestine" (paragraph 2), the document names the geographical borders of Palestine, "which extends from the River Jordan in the east to the Mediterranean in the west and from Ras Al-Naqurah in the north to Umm al-Rashrash in the south"—i.e., the entirety of Israel, the Gaza Strip, and the West Bank. Here, it is affirmed that Palestine "is an integral territorial unit. It is the land and the home of the Palestinian people". This definition is followed by a general Islamic reference (paragraph 3): "Palestine is an Arab Islamic land. It is a blessed sacred land that has a special place in the heart of every Arab and every Muslim."

This is followed by a definition of Palestinians (paragraphs 4 to 6): "The Palestinians are the Arabs who lived in Palestine until 1947, irrespective of whether they were expelled from it, or stayed in it; and every person that was born to an Arab Palestinian father after that date, whether inside or outside Palestine, is a Palestinian. ... The Palestinian identity is authentic and timeless; it is passed from generation to generation."

The following part (paragraphs 7 to 11) describes Palestine as the heart of the Arab and Islamic Ummah and emphasizes the special status of Jerusalem in Islam. In the next part (paragraphs 12 and 13), the right of the displaced Palestinians to return to their homeland is postulated to exist under divine law, human rights law, and international law.

The "Zionist project" (paragraphs 14 to 17) is described as a "racist, aggressive, colonial and expansionist project based on seizing the properties of others" that is hostile to the Palestinian people and their aspirations for freedom, return, and self-determination. This project, the document says, not only poses a threat to the Palestinians but also threatens the "security and interests" of the entire Arab and Islamic Ummah. The document goes on to state that the conflict revolves solely around the "Zionist project" and that there is no religious conflict with Jewish people. It states that "Hamas rejects the persecution of any human being or the undermining of his or her rights on nationalist, religious or sectarian grounds. Hamas is of the view that the Jewish problem, anti-Semitism and the persecution of the Jews are phenomena fundamentally linked to European history and not to the history of the Arabs and the Muslims or to their heritage."

Under the heading "The position toward Occupation and Political Solutions" (paragraphs 18 to 23), the document describes the two-state solution—i.e., the creation of an independent Palestinian state in accordance with the 1967 borders with Jerusalem as its capital—as a "formula of national consensus", but without giving up the claim to the whole of Palestine, "from the river to the sea", and "without compromising its rejection of the Zionist entity." Rickard Lagervall, of Jönköping University, viewed this as an "ambiguous formulation". Tareq Baconi, of Columbia University and the European Council on Foreign Relations, gives two reasons why Hamas refused to explicitly recognize Israel:

- The Palestine Liberation Organization (PLO) unilaterally offered Israel recognition without extracting an Israeli commitment to recognize the State of Palestine; thus, it weakened its own negotiating position, which Hamas wanted to avoid.
- Secondly, Hamas and Palestinian society at large could be willing to recognize the fact Israel now exists, but they cannot legitimize Zionism or legitimize what happened to the Palestinians during Israel's creation.

The charter criticizes the agreements reached in the Oslo Accords and rejects them as incompatible with international law. It describes the state of Israel, created with the help of Western nations, as "entirely illegal" (Arabic: باطل, bâtil, meaning an invalid act or contract according to sharia). Israeli military analyst Shaul Bartal interpreted this section to mean that the two-state solution was envisaged as a temporary stage and the long-term goal remained the liberation of the whole of Palestine.

The section on "Resistance and Liberation" (paragraphs 24 to 26) also refers to international law and states that this legitimizes armed resistance against an occupying power, with armed resistance seen as "the strategic choice for protecting the principles and the rights of the Palestinian people". At the same time, the document speaks of "diversifying the means and methods" of resistance and includes "popular and peaceful resistance".

The document adopts a conciliatory tone in the section "The Palestinian Political System" (paragraphs 27 to 34): commonalities with other Palestinian groups are emphasized, and differences are downplayed. The national role of the PLO and the Palestinian Authority is explicitly recognized, and the document concludes by referring in secular language to the "fundamental" role of Palestinian women in the "project of resistance, liberation and building the political system".

In the last two sections, titled "The Arab and Islamic Ummah" (paragraphs 35 to 37) and "The Humanitarian and International Aspect" (paragraphs 38 to 42), Hamas makes clear that it has no interest in interfering in the internal affairs of other countries in the region that have seen upheaval as part of the Arab Spring uprisings. These paragraphs delineate the limits and modes of cooperation with countries and the wider Ummah. Paragraph 41 also says that Hamas "denounces" any support given for "the Zionist entity".

=== Rejection of antisemitism ===
In contrast to the 1988 Hamas charter, the 2017 covenant separates its anti-Zionism from general antisemitism, stating Hamas fights Zionists, not for their Jewishness but because of their "illegal" project:

Hamas affirms that its conflict is with the Zionist project not with the Jews because of their religion. Hamas does not wage a struggle against the Jews because they are Jewish but wages a struggle against the Zionists who occupy Palestine. Yet, it is the Zionists who constantly identify Judaism and the Jews with their own colonial project and illegal entity. Hamas rejects the persecution of any human being or the undermining of his or her rights on nationalist, religious or sectarian grounds. Hamas is of the view that the Jewish problem, antisemitism and the persecution of the Jews are phenomena fundamentally linked to European history and not to the history of the Arabs and the Muslims or to their heritage.

In an interview with Al Jazeera about the shift in Hamas's ideology from the 1988 charter, which referred to "the Jews," to the 2017 charter that labels the enemy as "Zionists," Khaled Mashal, then the leader of Hamas, stated in early May 2017 that in the old charter, indeed, "the expression ['Jews'] was used." In the interview, Mashal criticized the old charter as "not (...) accurate" enough, emphasizing that Hamas's struggle, "from the very start", was against "the Israeli occupier ... not because they are Jews, (...) not because of their religion, but because (...) they have occupied our land, and attacked our people, and forced them out of their homes."

== Reception ==
The reception of the paper ranged from cautious welcomes by those who saw hints of compromise from Hamas to harshest rejection by those viewing it as a deceptive, merely cosmetic PR exercise.

Mohammed Ayoob, Distinguished Professor of International Relations at Michigan State University, and Danielle Nicole Lussier saw the policy paper as a sign of "pragmatism", as it left open the possibility of a two-state solution and expressed willingness to co-operate with the Palestinian Authority. Khaled Hroub (University of Cambridge) wrote that with the paper, Hamas wanted to distance itself from the reputation of a terrorist organisation and instead "present itself as a responsible political partner whose leadership had won free and fair elections and was able to speak the language of politics and resistance in its own way".

Martin Kear, a political scientist at the University of Sydney, stated that the 2017 document's most significant development was Hamas’s explicit acceptance of a Palestinian state confined to the OPT with East Jerusalem as its capital. This marked a decisive shift from earlier positions of merely ‘working with’ or ‘respecting’ it, "Hamas had now come to "accept" the two- state solution in totality". Kear also noted that while Hamas had already accepted two-states and implicitly recognised Israel in prior years, as with the Mecca Agreement in 2007, "the distinction between then and now is that for the first time, a truncated Palestinian state became a central pillar of Hamas’s ideological narrative rather than simply a policy position." Alongside this major concession, the document retained some strategic ambiguity in line with Hamas' strategy to accentuate its resistance rhetoric to provide it with political cover for its concessions: it defended the right to armed struggle and refused to recognize Israel’s legitimacy as a Zionist entity, stating that doing so would legitimize the occupation, refugee displacement, settlements, and the Judaization of Jerusalem. Kear noted that the document’s wording and tone reflected ideological flexibility, as alongside the acceptance of two-states it does not call for Israel's destruction, frames their struggle against Zionists rather than Jews, and emphasizes the denial of Palestinian self-determination rather than religion.

Kear and political scientists Tristan Dunning (University of Queensland) and Imad Alsoos (Max Planck Institute for Social Anthropology) stated that "Hamas’ new 2017 charter officially codifying the possibility of a two state solution with Israel is a welcome development."

Beverley Milton-Edwards, a political scientist at the University of Belfast, said the acknowledgement of the “land for peace” formula (like in UNSC Res. 242) in the declaration was an important starting point for future peace negotiations, one that other Arab parties to the conflict such as Syria, Egypt and the PLO had also advocated as part of a formula for resolving the conflicts and building peace. Muhammad Abu Saada, a professor at Al-Azhar University in Gaza, said: "Hamas is trying to walk a fine line between its hardliners and its own moderates [...] In one way, the moderates can say they accepted a Palestinian state on the 1967 borders, but the hardliners can still say they are not recognising Israel."

Nina Musgrave, a scholar at the King's College, London, characterised the document as an "updated communication of the group’s strategy" and noted that it repeated some of its longstanding principles but also showed a "more balanced approach" to Israel. Dutch scholar Joas Wagemakers argued that the 2017 charter clearly moved to omit all anti-Semitic elements and to take a nationalist viewpoint instead.

Azzam Tamimi, a British-Palestinian political scientist close to the Hamas movement said that the new document would "practically" replace the founding charter of 1988. Mustafa Barghouti, party chairman of the Palestinian National Initiative, said, "Acceptance of a Palestinian state along the 1967 borders ... means accepting a two-state solution" and described the document as "a sign of maturity and a sign of political development". Michael Schulz (University of Gothenburg) thought the statement on the two-state solution being a "formula of national consensus" showed a readiness on the part of Hamas to accept such a solution permanently even if it wasn't its own preference, provided it could be shown to be the declared will of the Palestinian people. According to Schulz, this would require a legitimate future referendum involving all Palestinians living in the West Bank, Gaza and East Jerusalem as well as those living in the Diaspora. Tristan Dunning, a political scientist at the University of Queensland, wrote in 2017 that Hamas had been open to some kind of permanent solution with Israel since the mid-1990s. The changes to the charter were therefore "positive and long overdue but, in many ways, [...] perhaps too little, too late to make any meaningful change to the dynamics of the Palestine-Israel conflict." The Palestinian Authority's Mohammed Shtayyeh accused Hamas of being decades behind in its thinking, telling CNN: "Hamas is debating things [the PLO] did 43 years ago." Palestinian Islamic Jihad, meanwhile, accused Hamas of undermining fundamental Palestinian principles.

Jerome Slater (Professor Emeritus, State University of New York at Buffalo) pointed out that while the document seemed to accept an Israel within the 1967 borders, it also called for the right of Palestinians to return to their original homes, now in Israel. That represented an obvious logical contradiction, but an Israeli government genuinely interested in a political settlement would have used the new charter and other signs of moderation on the part of Hamas as a basis for further talks, which did not happen.

Journalist Tim Assmann saw a more moderate choice of words in the policy paper, but no significant change in Hamas' position. Matthew Levitt and Maxine Rich, researchers at the Washington Institute for Near East Policy, saw the document as an attempt by Hamas to present itself in a more moderate light in order to gain greater international support, given its now more tenuous relations with Iran, the Egyptian government's fight against the Muslim Brotherhood and the bleak economic situation in the Gaza Strip, recently exacerbated by an energy crisis. Joseph Spoerl, a researcher of Islam at Saint Anselm College, expressed the view that anti-Semitism was still central to Hamas' ideology and one could not take seriously Hamas' statement, expressed in the new charter, that their conflict was with the Zionist occupation of Palestine rather than with Jews.

Historian Anne Perez agreed with the view that Hamas' supposed renunciation of antisemitism was hollow. She points out that even in 2019, two years after the charter's publication, senior Hamas official Fathi Hamad called for mass violence against "every Jew on the globe."

Shaul Bartal, an Israeli military analyst and lecturer in Palestinian affairs at Bar-Ilan University, stated that the Palestinian state created by a two-state solution would then be a state without concessions regarding Palestinians' right of return and without a permanent solution that would also be binding for future generations. David Keyes, spokesman for Israeli Prime Minister Benjamin Netanyahu from 2016 to 2018, described the policy paper as an attempt by Hamas "to fool the world". Netanyahu himself crumpled up a copy of the document on camera and threw it in a wastepaper basket. "The new Hamas document says that Israel has no right to exist, it says every inch of our land belongs to the Palestinians, it says there is no acceptable solution other than to remove Israel ... they want to use their state to destroy our state," Netanyahu said.

The Israeli Meir Amit Intelligence and Terrorism Information Centre assessed that the 2017 Hamas document presented "no change in Hamas's basic ideology and principles, which are based on an uncompromising effort to destroy Israel through violence and terrorism, even if this is carried out in stages (presenting conditional willingness to establish a Palestinian state within the 1967 borders). The adjustments, changes and additions that appear in the Political Document are intended to present the appearance of Hamas's renewal and adaptation to the current reality, but without any significant change in the principles and basic perception that constitute the core of the Document." In the European Union, the US and Russia, the new document was also received rather coldly, much to Hamas's surprise and dismay; internal critics of the document saw themselves vindicated and became louder again.

According to Benedetta Berti the 2017 document preserves a continuity with the 1988 charter but has less religious references and its tone is less "millenarist and exclusionary."

=== Assessments amid the 2023–2025 Gaza war ===
Daniel Byman (Georgetown University) and Mackenzie Holtz, in an analysis for the Center for Strategic and International Studies on December 6, 2023, said the negative reactions to the new charter could partly explain Hamas' terrorist attack on Israel on October 7: Netanyahu binned the document, wanted to cut funding for the United Nations Relief and Works Agency for Palestine, and gave a platform to far-right ideologues such as Bezalel Smotrich. There was thus no incentive for moderation, probably making the idea of a large-scale attack more attractive. To support this view, Byman and Holtz cited an interview statement by Hamas official Basem Naim: "We knew there was going to be a violent reaction. ... But we didn't choose this road while having other options. We have no options." Yahya Sinwar, the political and military leader of Hamas in Gaza, reportedly supported the new charter but then took a more extreme position when it failed to lead to a political settlement with Israel.

Tareq Baconi, who has documented Hamas over the last 20 years, said in December 2023 that the 2017 charter had called Israel's bluff by agreeing to the 1967 borders – and the lack of Israeli response demonstrated to Palestinians that Israel was not interested in the 1967 line.

According to extremism researcher Armin Pfahl-Traughber, who pointed out the continuities in the 2017 document compared to the earlier one, the "formal moderation" of the new charter had "a clear objective", namely "strategic deception". In his view, its use of "from the river to the sea" alone implied "a corresponding intention of destruction characterized by violence" towards the state of Israel, and he viewed Hamas's October 2023 attack on Israel as but the latest illustration of this. The Wilson Center's Mark A. Green noted that Hamas said in its 2017 charter that it "rejects the persecution of any human being or the undermining of his or her rights on nationalist, religious or sectarian grounds", and that its 7 October 2023 attack on Israel killed around 1,200 people. Anna Baltzer argued the 2017 charter was evidence that the October 7 attacks were not motivated by antisemitism but rather Hamas's opposition to the Israeli occupation.

The 2017 charter's call to create a Palestinian state based on the 1967 borders was echoed by Ismail Haniyeh in November 2023, amid the Gaza war.

== Bibliography ==
- Alsoos, Imad (2021-09-03). "From jihad to resistance: the evolution of Hamas's discourse in the framework of mobilization". Middle Eastern Studies. 57 (5): 833–856. doi:10.1080/00263206.2021.1897006. ISSN 0026-3206.
- Ayoob, Mohammed; Lussier, Danielle Nicole (2020). The Many Faces of Political Islam: Religion and Politics in Muslim Societies. University of Michigan Press. ISBN 978-0-472-03765-0.
- Brenner, Bjorn (2017). Gaza Under Hamas: From Islamic Democracy to Islamist Governance. Bloomsbury Academic. ISBN 978-0-7556-3439-2.
- "Charters of Hamas". Contemporary Review of the Middle East. 4 (4): 393–418. 2017-11-01. doi:10.1177/2347798917727905. ISSN 2347-7989.
- Hroub, Khaled (2017-08-01). "A Newer Hamas? The Revised Charter". Journal of Palestine Studies. 46 (4): 100–111. doi:10.1525/jps.2017.46.4.100. ISSN 0377-919X.
- Luz, Nimrod (2023-09-07). The Politics of Sacred Places: A View from Israel-Palestine. Bloomsbury Publishing. ISBN 978-1-350-29573-5.
- Radonic, Ljiljana (2021). "New Antisemitism and New Media: Leftist Derealization of Islamist "Emancipation"". In Lange, Armin; Mayerhofer, Kerstin; Porat, Dina; Schiffman, Lawrence H. (eds.). Confronting Antisemitism in Modern Media, the Legal and Political Worlds. Walter de Gruyter GmbH & Co KG. ISBN 978-3-11-067203-9.
- Schulz, Michael (2020). Between Resistance, Sharia Law, and Demo-Islamic Politics. Rowman & Littlefield. ISBN 978-1-5381-4610-1.
- Slater, Jerome (2020). Mythologies Without End: The US, Israel, and the Arab-Israeli Conflict, 1917-2020. Oxford University Press. ISBN 978-0-19-045909-3.
