= From the river to the sea =

Political phrase related to the Palestine region

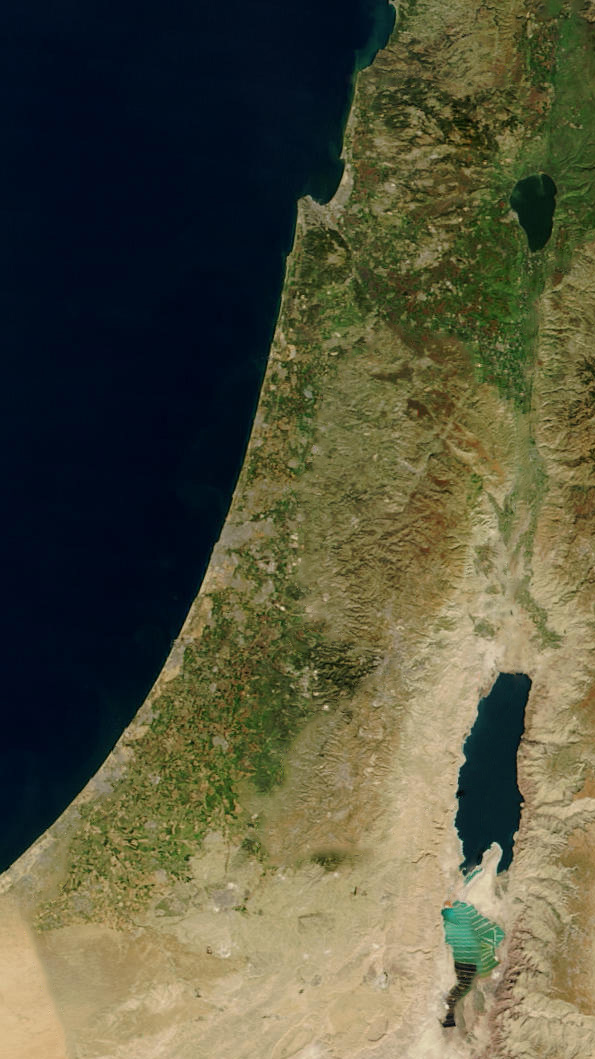
- The region of Palestine, from the Jordan River in the east to the Mediterranean Sea in the west
- Etymology: The Jordan River and the Mediterranean Sea
- Context: Israeli–Palestinian conflict
- Meaning: A political slogan promoting the one-state solution between the two referenced bodies of water

"From the river to the sea" (Arabic: من النهر إلى البحر, romanized: min an-nahr ʾilā l-baḥr; Palestinian Arabic: من المياه للمياه, romanized: min il-ṃayye la-l-ṃayye, lit. 'from the water to the water') is a political slogan that refers to the area between the Jordan River and the Mediterranean Sea – an area historically known as Palestine, which was formerly ruled by the British as Mandatory Palestine, and which today encompasses Israel and the occupied Palestinian territories of the West Bank and the Gaza Strip. The phrase and its variations have been used both by Palestinians and Israelis to mean that the area should consist of one state, rather than two or three.

In the 1960s, the Palestine Liberation Organization (PLO) used it to call for what they saw as a "decolonized" state encompassing the entirety of Mandatory Palestine. By 1969, after several revisions, the PLO used the phrase to call for a one-state solution, that would mean "one democratic secular state that would supersede the ethno-religious state of Israel".

Many pro-Palestinian activists describe the phrase as a call for peace, equality, and an end to Israeli apartheid and military rule over Palestine, while many pro-Israel groups and others interpret it as a call for the dissolution or destruction of Israel and have described it as antisemitic. Frequently, at pro-Palestine protests around the world, it has appeared as a chant or rallying cry. Hamas used the phrase in its 2017 charter; some supporters of Israel and other critics have cited its use by such Palestinian militant groups to say that it advocates for not only the dismantling of Israel, but the removal or extermination of its Jewish population. Based on these characterizations of the phrase as antisemitic or inciting violence, some countries have considered criminalizing its use. In other cases, courts and authorities have found that the phrase can fall within protected freedom of expression, depending on context, intent, and how it is used.

An early Zionist slogan envisaged statehood extending over the two banks of the Jordan river, and when that vision proved impractical, it was substituted by the idea of a Greater Israel, an entity conceived as extending from the Jordan to the sea. The phrase has also been used by Israeli politicians. The 1977 election manifesto of the right-wing Israeli Likud party said: "Between the sea and the Jordan there will only be Israeli sovereignty." Similar wording, such as referring to the area "west of the Jordan river", has also been used in the 2020s by other Israeli politicians, including Israeli prime minister Benjamin Netanyahu on 18 January 2024.

== Historical usage ==
The precise origins of the phrase are disputed. According to the American historian Robin D. G. Kelley, the phrase "began as a Zionist slogan signifying the boundaries of Eretz Israel." The Israeli-American historian Omer Bartov notes that Zionist usage of such language predates the establishment of the State of Israel in 1948 and began with the Revisionist movement of Zionism led by Ze'ev Jabotinsky, which spoke of establishing a Jewish state in all of Palestine and had a song, "The East Bank of the Jordan", which includes: "The Jordan has two banks; this one is ours, and the other one too," suggesting a Jewish state extending even beyond the Jordan River. In 1977, the concept appeared in an election manifesto of the Israeli political party Likud, which stated that "between the sea and the Jordan there will be only Israeli sovereignty". The current ideology of the Israeli government is rooted in Revisionist Zionism, which sought the entire territory of Mandatory Palestine.

The Middle East scholar Elliott Colla, writing in Mondoweiss, says that the relevant historical context for understanding "from the river to the sea" is the history of partition and fragmentation in Palestine, along with Israeli appropriation and annexation of Palestinian lands. In his opinion, these include: the 1947 UN Partition Plan for Palestine, which proposed to divide the land between the river and the sea; the 1948 Nakba, in which that plan materialized; the 1967 Six-Day War, in which Israel occupied the West Bank and Gaza; the Oslo Accords, that (in his view) fragmented the West Bank into Palestinian enclaves (that he describes as "an archipelago of Bantustans surrounded by Israeli settlements, bases, and checkpoints"); and the Israeli separation wall first erected after the Second Intifada.

Another element of historical context is given by Maha Nassar from University of Arizona. According to her, the phrase "from the river to the sea" was used by Palestinians even before 1967, and expressed then the hope of the Palestinians free themselves not only from the rule of Israel, but also from the rule of Jordan in the West Bank and from the rule of Egypt in the Gaza Strip.

The origins of Palestinian usage of this phrase are unclear. Kelley writes that the phrase was adopted by the Palestine Liberation Organization (PLO) in the mid-1960s; while Elliott Colla notes that "it is unclear when and where the slogan "from the river to the sea," first emerged within Palestinian protest culture." In November 2023, Colla wrote that he had not encountered the phrase — in either Standard nor Levantine Arabic — in Palestinian revolutionary media of the 1960s and 1970s and noted that "the phrase appears nowhere in the Palestinian National Charters of 1964 or 1968, nor in the Hamas Charter of 1988."

The 1964 charter of the PLO's Palestinian National Council called for "the recovery of the usurped homeland in its entirety". The 1964 charter stated that "Jews who are of Palestinian origin shall be considered Palestinians if they are willing to live peacefully and loyally in Palestine", specifically defining "Palestinian" as those who had "normally resided in Palestine until 1947". In the 1968 revision, the charter was further revised, stating that "Jews who had resided normally in Palestine until the beginning of the Zionist invasion" would be considered Palestinian. In the 1969 revision, the PLO promised equal citizenship to all Jews, including those who had recently immigrated, if they renounced Zionism. Thus by 1969, according to Kelley, the PLO used the phrase "free Palestine from the river to the sea" to mean a single democratic secular state that would replace Israel.

In 1979, the phrase was invoked by delegates attending the Palestine Congress of North America.

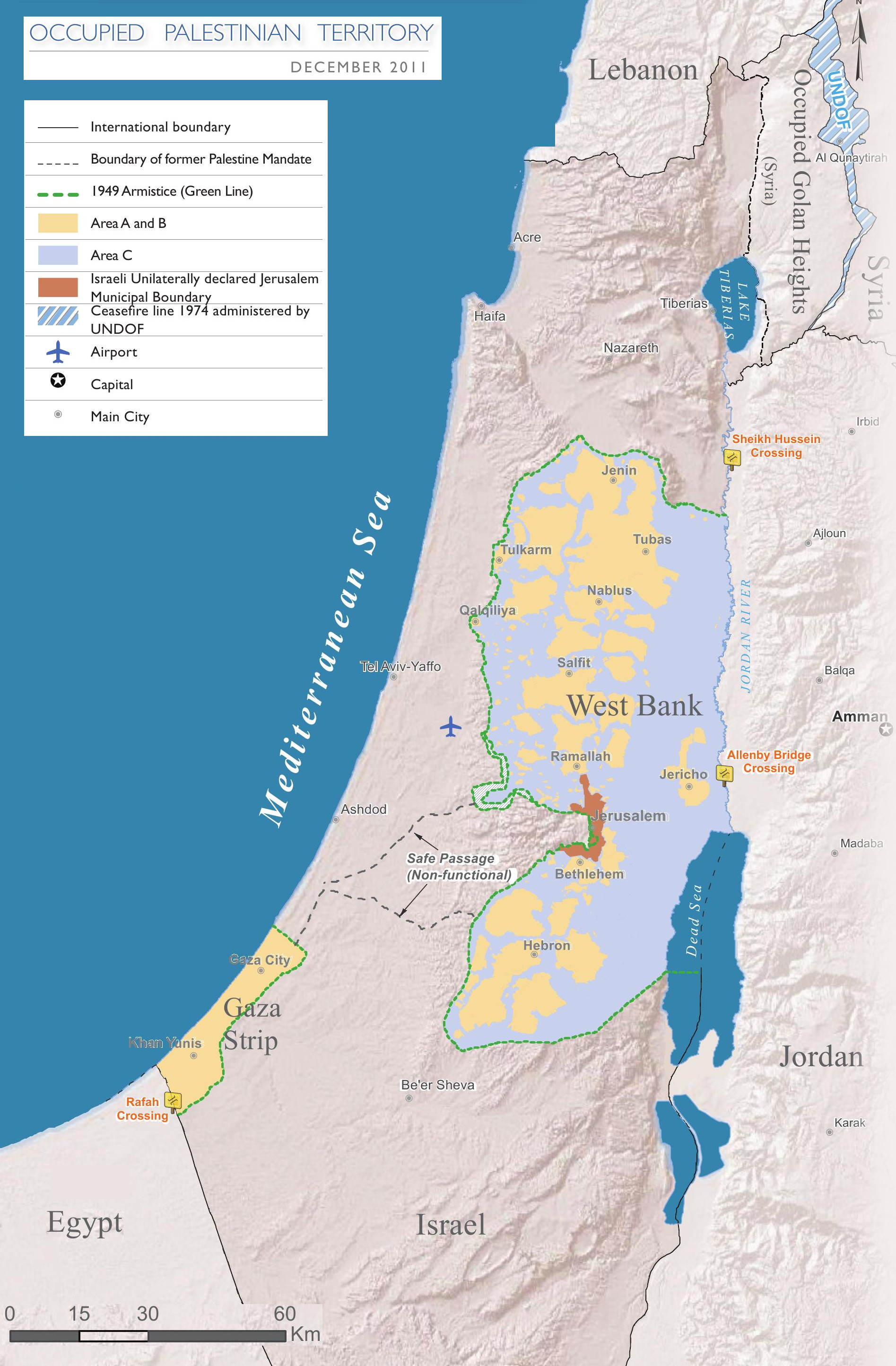
Map showing Israel and the Palestinian Territories as outlined by the Oslo Accords in 1993. The Jordan River is on the right, and the Mediterranean Sea is on the left.

Colla notes that activists of the First Intifada (1987–1993) "remember hearing variations of the phrase in Arabic from the late 1980s onwards" and that the phrases have been documented in graffiti from the period in works such as Saleh Abd al-Jawad's "Faṣāʾil al-ḥaraka l-waṭaniyya l-Filasṭīniyya fī l-ʾarāḍī l-muḥtalla wa-shuʿārāt al-judrān" (1991) and Julie Peteet's "The Writing on the Walls: The Graffiti of the Intifada" (1996).

The phrase appeared in a 2021 B'Tselem report entitled "A Regime of Jewish Supremacy from the Jordan River to the Mediterranean Sea: This Is Apartheid" that described Israel's de facto rule over the territory from the river to the sea, through its occupation of the West Bank and blockade of the Gaza Strip, as a regime of apartheid.

== Variations ==
The different versions of the slogan that developed over the time emphasize different aspects of the Palestinian struggle. The version min an-nahr ʾilā l-baḥr / Filasṭīn sa-tataḥarrar (من النهر إلى البحر / فلسطين ستتحرر, "from the river to the sea / Palestine will be free") has a focus on liberation and freedom. The version min il-ṃayye la-l-ṃayye / Falasṭīn ʿarabiyye (من المية للمية / فلسطين عربية, "from the water to the water / Palestine is Arab") has an Arab nationalist sentiment, and the version min il-ṃayye la-l-ṃayye / Falasṭīn ʾislāmiyye (من المية للمية / فلسطين إسلامية, "from the water to the water / Palestine is Islamic") has Islamic or Islamist sentiment. According to Colla, the latter two versions have been used in the graffiti of the late 1980s, the period of the First Intifada. Colla says the rhyming "From the river to the sea, Palestine will be free"—the translation of min an-nahr ʾilā l-baḥr / Filasṭīn sa-tataḥarrar—is the version that has circulated among English speakers expressing solidarity with Palestine since at least the 1990s.

Similar formulations have been used by Zionists and Israelis. Omer Bartov notes the song "The East Bank of the Jordan" (1929) by the Revisionist Zionist leader Vladimir Jabotinsky (1880–1940) used the formulation shtei gadót le-Yardén: zo shelánu, zo gam kan (שתי גדות לירדן: זו שלנו, זו גם כן, "the Jordan has two banks; this one is ours, and the other one too"). The Likud Party used the formulation ben ha-yam le-Yardén tihyé rak ribonút israelít (בין הים לירדן תהיה רק ריבונות ישראלית, "between the sea and the Jordan there will only be Israeli sovereignty").

== Usage ==
=== Use by Palestinian militant groups ===
Hamas, as part of its revised 2017 charter, rejected "any alternative to the full and complete liberation of Palestine, from the river to the sea", referring to all areas of former Mandatory Palestine and by extension, the end of Jewish sovereignty in the region. The same document's call for "full and complete liberation.. from the river to the sea" has been cited by the Anti-Defamation League, the American Jewish Committee, and Israeli officials as evidence that Hamas continues to reject the existence of a Jewish state in any part of the territory.

However, in the sentence immediately following the first mentioned, it accepts "the establishment of a fully sovereign and independent Palestinian state, with Jerusalem as its capital along the lines of the 4th of June 1967, with the return of the refugees and the displaced to their homes from which they were expelled, to be a formula of national consensus." Many scholars see Hamas' acceptance of the 1967 borders as a tacit acceptance of another entity on the other side.

Palestinian Islamic Jihad declared that "from the river to the sea – [Palestine] is an Arab Islamic land that [it] is legally forbidden from abandoning any inch of, and the Israeli presence in Palestine is a null existence, which is forbidden by law to recognize. Islamists have used a version "Palestine is Islamic from the river to the sea".

=== Similar sayings by the Israeli right ===
The phrase was also used by the Israeli ruling Likud party as part of their 1977 election manifesto which stated "Judea and Samaria will not be handed to any foreign administration; between the Sea and the Jordan there will only be Israeli sovereignty." Likud party leader and prime minister Menachem Begin said that "Judea and Samaria are an inseparable part of Israel's sovereignty". Most recently this has been stated by Israeli prime minister Benjamin Netanyahu. Similar wording has also been used more recently by other Israeli politicians, such as Gideon Sa'ar and also Uri Ariel of The Jewish Home. In 2014 Ariel said, "Between the Jordan River and the Mediterranean Sea there will be only one state, which is Israel." Similar wording has also been used more recently by other Israeli politicians.

=== Use internationally ===
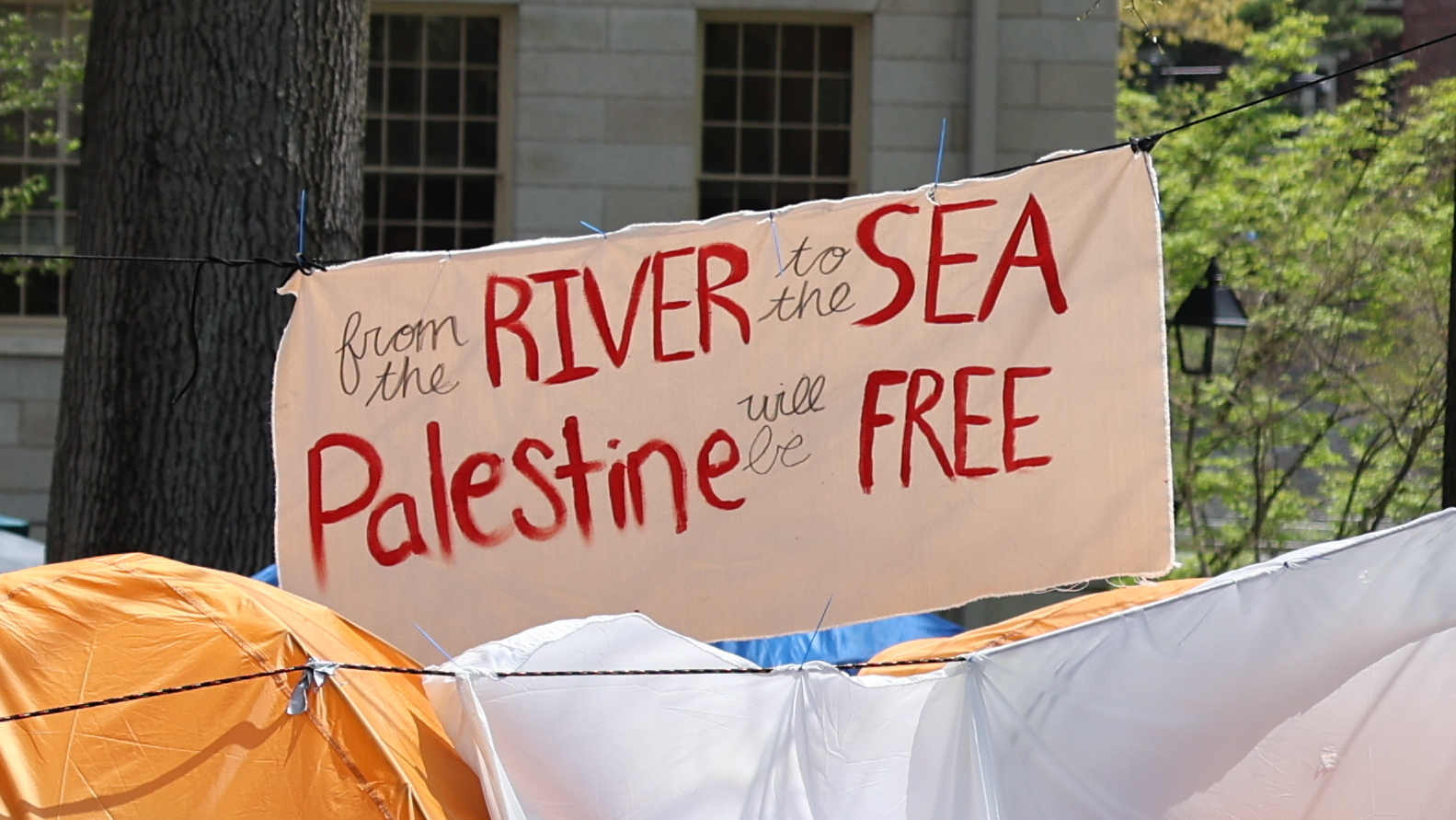
A banner displayed at an encampment at Harvard University In Massachusetts reads "from the river to the sea, Palestine will be free," May 2024.

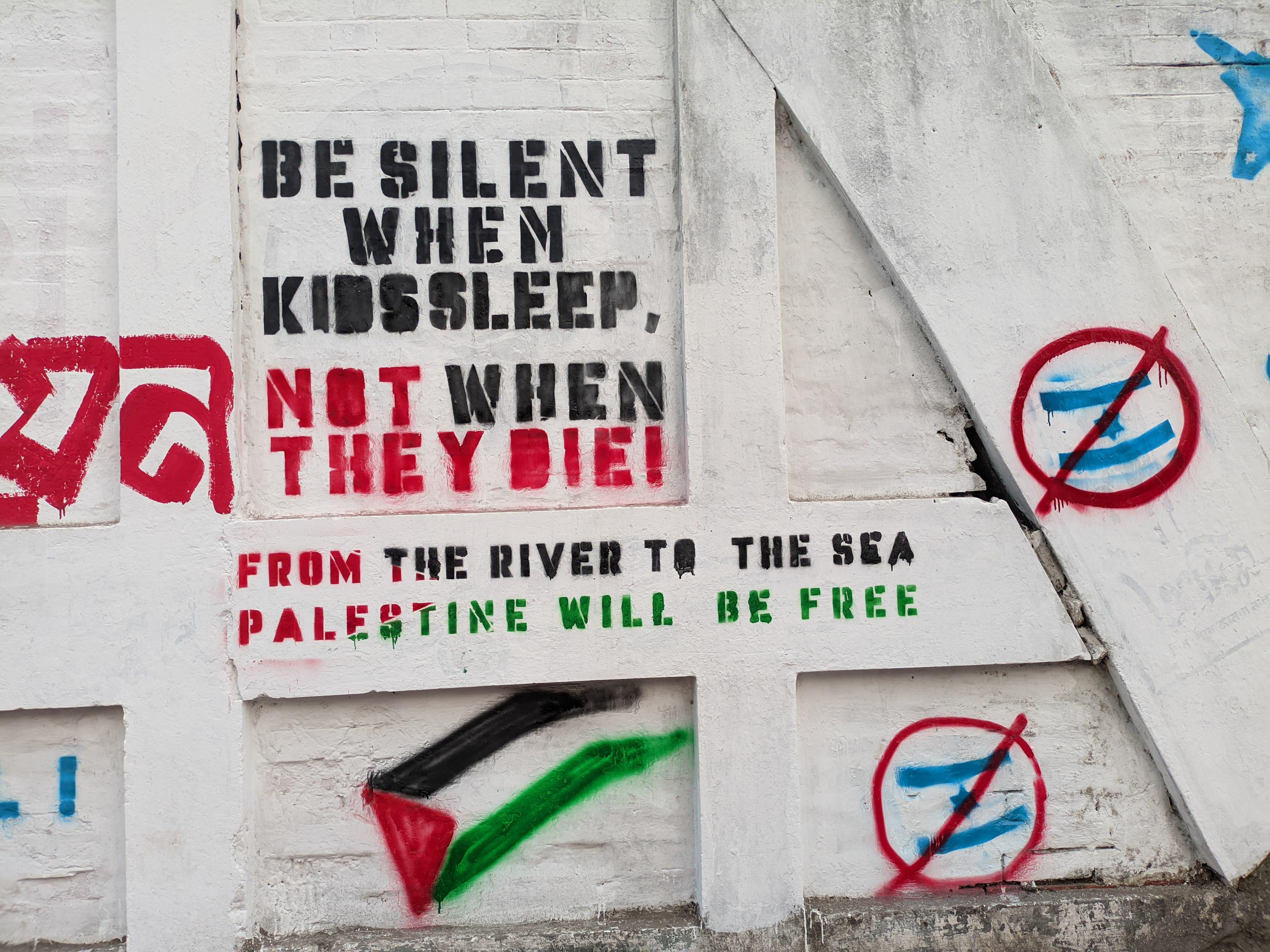
Graffiti at the Teacher-Student Centre, University of Dhaka, Bangladesh

Among the materials recovered by American forces during the killing of al-Qaeda founder Osama bin Laden was a speech addressed to the American people, in which bin Laden proposed economic and security guarantees in exchange for a "roadmap that returns the Palestine land to us, all of it, from the sea to the river, it is an Islamic land not subject to being traded or granted to any party."

On 27 September 2008, Hezbollah secretary-general Hassan Nasrallah stated at a rally "Palestine, from the sea to the river, is the property of Arabs and Palestinians and no one has the right to give up even a single grain of earth or one stone, because every grain of the land is holy. The entire land must be returned to its rightful owners." Former Iranian President Ebrahim Raisi, in 2023, used the phrase, saying "The only solution is a Palestinian state from the river to the sea", meaning that the only solution to the conflict would be a Palestinian state encompassing all of Israel and the Palestinian territories. In 2003, then–Iraqi President Saddam Hussein, during a speech commemorating the anniversary of the Iraqi Army's establishment, referred to the Palestinian people and the Israeli–Palestinian conflict, stating "Long live Palestine, free and Arab, from the sea to the river".

On 30 November 2018, CNN fired the American academic Marc Lamont Hill from his position as a political commentator after he delivered a speech at the United Nations on the International Day of Solidarity with the Palestinian People ending with the words: "...we have an opportunity, to not just offer solidarity in words, but to commit to political action, grassroots action, local action, and international action that will give us what justice requires. And that is a free Palestine, from the river to the sea." The ADL accused Hill of using the phrase "from the river to the sea" as code for the destruction of Israel. Hill apologized, but later tweeted "You say 'River to the Sea' is "universally" understood to mean the destruction of the Jewish State? On what basis do you make this claim? Did it signify destruction when it was the slogan of the Likud Party? Or when currently used by the Israeli Right?"

On 30 October 2023, British Member of Parliament Andy McDonald was suspended from the Labour Party after stating in a pro-Palestine rally speech: "We won't rest until we have justice, until all people, Israelis and Palestinians, between the river and the sea can live in peaceful liberty". The party described McDonald's comment as "deeply offensive". McDonald said at the time, "These words should not be construed in any other way than they were intended, namely as a heartfelt plea for an end to killings in Israel, Gaza, and the occupied West Bank, and for all peoples in the region to live in freedom without the threat of violence."

As of 1 November 2023, the (English) Football Association barred the use of the phrase by its players, stating they made clear to teams "that this phrase is considered offensive to many" and that the league will seek police guidance on how [they] should treat it and respond" if players have used it. On November 5 the Met Police stopped working with an adviser who chanted the slogan during a protest saying this appears "antisemitic and contrary with our values".

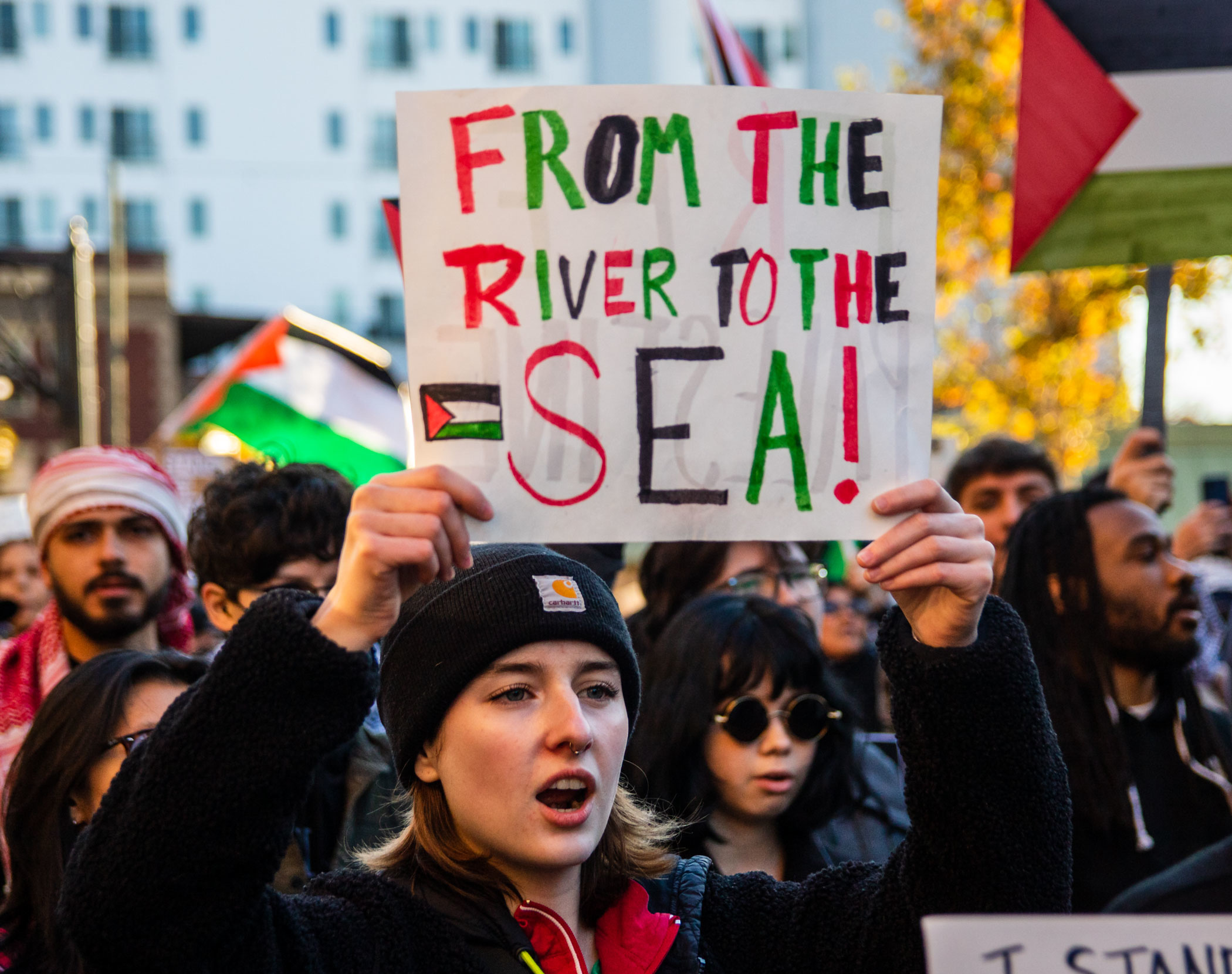
Pro-Palestinian protestor holding a sign in Columbus, Ohio

On 7 November 2023, United States Representative Rashida Tlaib was censured by the House of Representatives in part for using the phrase, which Tlaib defended as "an aspirational call for freedom, human rights and peaceful coexistence, not death, destruction or hate". Before the vote, House Democratic leader Hakeem Jeffries criticized the phrase as something which is "widely understood as calling for the complete destruction of Israel". On 8 November 2023, the White House condemned Tlaib for using the phrase. White House Press Secretary Karine Jean-Pierre said that "when it comes to the phrase that was used, 'from the river to the sea,' it is divisive, it is hurtful, many find it hurtful and many find it antisemitic," and added that the White House "categorically reject[s] applying the term to the (2023 Israel–Hamas) conflict."

In April 2024, the US Congress overwhelmingly passed a bipartisan resolution, 377-44, to condemn the phrase as antisemitic.

The DMV in California recalled license plates referencing the phrase "on the ground that the plate configuration carried connotations offensive to good taste." An ensuing lawsuit brought by the vehicle owner against the DMV is ongoing.

=== Use on social media ===
The phrase has been used across social media, including on TikTok.

On 15 November 2023, Jewish influencers and celebrities confronted TikTok executives in a private call, to press them to moderate use of the phrase on the platform. Adam Presser, head of operations for TikTok, stated that only content "where it is clear exactly what they mean...that content is violative and we take it down," adding that if "someone is just using it casually, then that has been considered acceptable speech." In a statement, TikTok said that content using the phrase "in a way that threatens violence and spreads hate" is not allowed on the platform. A report by Fortune described an additional Zoom call between "about 40 mostly Jewish tech leaders," including Anthony Goldbloom, and TikTok executives, on 16 November, claiming that the platform's algorithm favored "content that supports Palestine over pro-Israel content" and pushing the platform to "reexamine its community guidelines", with the company rejecting "blunt comparisons" of hashtags on the platform and stating that the imbalance of content is not the result of "any kind of intended or unintended bias in its algorithms."

On 17 November 2023, Elon Musk, the owner of Twitter, announced a policy change, stating that users who use terms like "decolonization" and "from the river to the sea," or similar expressions would be suspended. He claimed these terms were used as euphemisms for extreme violence or genocide. Musk's announcement came after he was criticized for "endorsing an antisemitic post" on the platform two days before, and companies such as IBM, Comcast, Apple, Paramount Global, Disney, and Lionsgate announced a pause of ads on the platform.

Jonathan Greenblatt, the CEO of the Anti-Defamation League, applauded Musk's action on 17 November, calling it "an important and welcome move" and praising his "leadership in fighting hate." Greenblatt's statement was reported by The Guardian as being part of an effort to gain influence on the far right, and that the head of the ADL's Center for Technology and Society (CTS), Yael Eisenstat, quit her position in protest. Other ADL staffers expressed their opposition to Greenblatt's move. Rolling Stone stated that it was "doubtful" that Twitter users would be suspended for "repeating either phrase." Noah Lanard of Mother Jones wrote that the new policy would "presumably apply only to those who use the phrase [from the river to the sea] in support of Palestinians" and argued that Musk is "trying to cover up for his own bigotry." Pro-Palestinian users criticized Musk's new policy, arguing he was conflating legitimate political speech with "calls for violence" and was "limiting free speech."

On 4 September 2024, Meta's Oversight Board published a decision that allows the phrase to be used on Meta's platforms, and argued that the phrase on its own does not violate the rules on "Hate Speech, Violence and Incitement or Dangerous Organizations and Individuals".

=== Civic usage ===
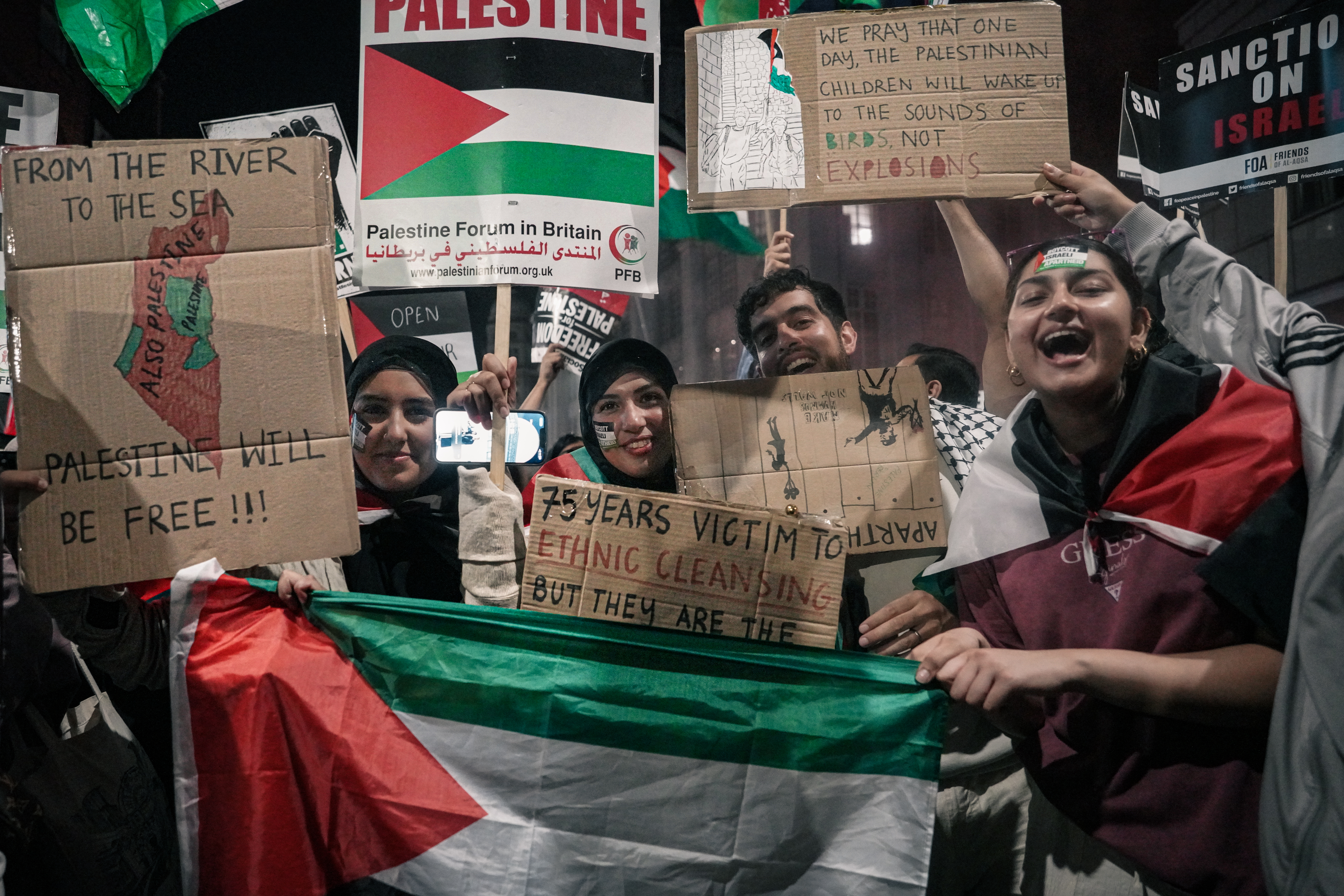
Pro-Palestinian rally in London, 9 October 2023

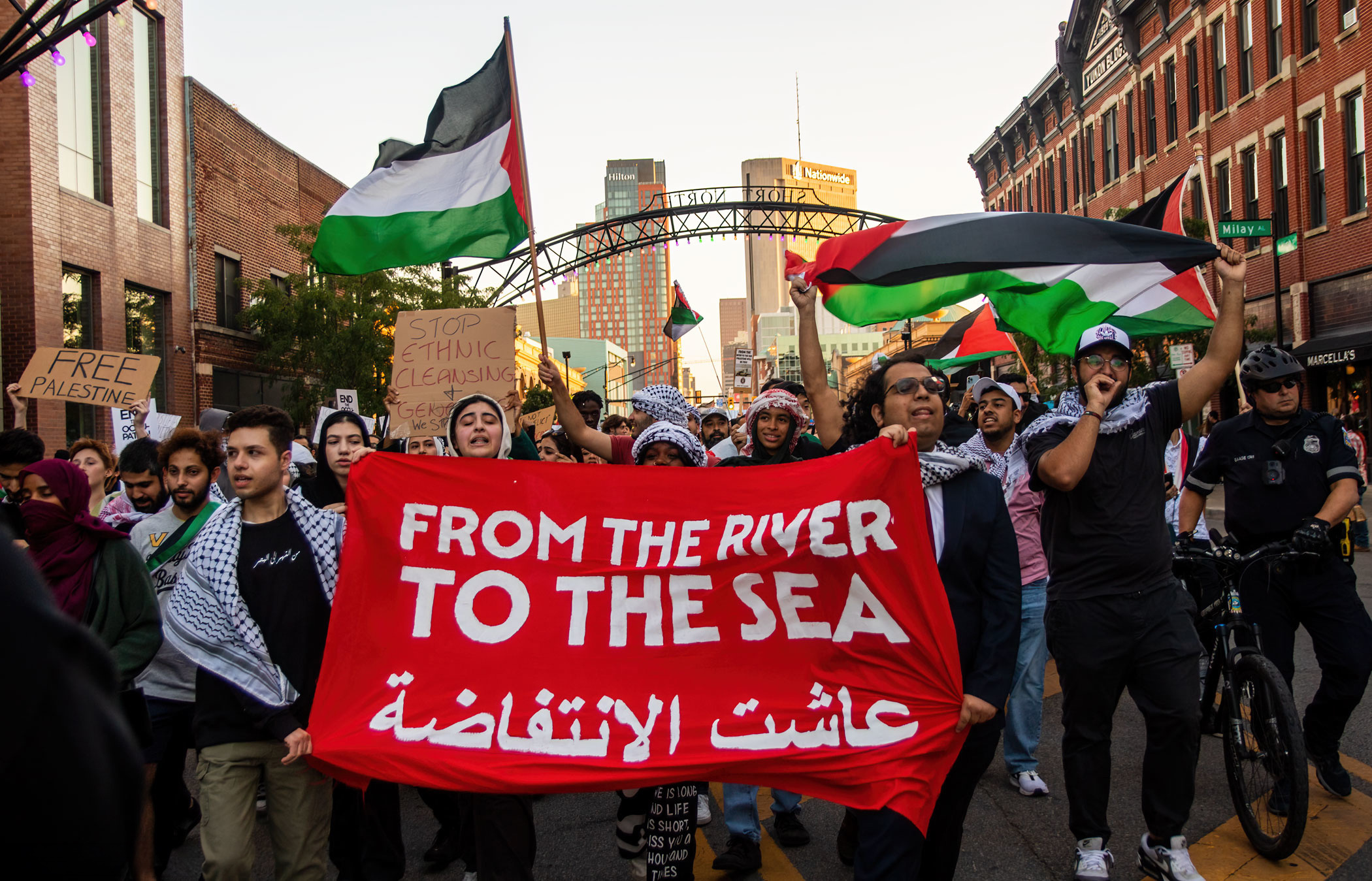
Pro-Palestinian rally in Columbus, Ohio, 12 October 2023, with an Arabic reference to the Intifada

The phrase has been used widely in pro-Palestinian protest movements. It has often been chanted at pro-Palestinian demonstrations, usually followed or preceded by the phrase "Palestine will be free" (the phrase rhymes in English, not Arabic). The version "from the water to the water / Palestine is Arab" has s as also been chanted (in English or Arabic) at anti-Israel demonstrations in the West.

Interpretations differ amongst its supporters. In a survey conducted by the Arab World for Research and Development on 14 November, 74.7% Palestinians agreed that they support a single Palestinian state "from the river to the sea", while only 5.4% of respondents supported a "one-state for two peoples" solution.

Civic figures, activists, and progressive publications have said that the phrase calls for a one-state solution: a single, secular state in all of Historic Palestine where people of all religions have equal citizenship. This stands in contrast to the two-state solution, which envisions a Palestinian state existing alongside a Jewish state. This usage has been described as speaking out for the right of Palestinians "to live freely in the land from the river to the sea", with Palestinian writer Yousef Munayyer describing the phrase as "a rejoinder to the fragmentation of Palestinian land and people by Israeli occupation and discrimination." Others have said it stands for "the equal freedom and dignity of the Palestinian people." Elliott Colla traces the first evidence of use of the phrase in Palestinian protest culture to the First Intifada (1987–1993), with documentation in graffiti from the period.

On 8 November 2023, Amazon told Newsweek that they would not be removing pro-Palestinian merchandise, including garments bearing the phrase, stating that the items do not "contravene our policies," which prohibit sale of products which "promote, incite, or glorify hatred, violence, racial, sexual, or religious intolerance."

== Criticism ==
Some politicians and advocacy groups such as the Anti-Defamation League (ADL) and American Jewish Committee consider the phrase to be antisemitic, hate speech and incitement to genocide. They suggest that it denies the right of Jews for self-determination in their ancestral homeland, or advocates for their removal or extermination. Such critics of the phrase claim that it has been explicitly used to call for the land to be placed entirely under Arab rule at the cost of the State of Israel and its Jewish citizens.

According to ADL regional director Jonah Steinberg, from the time of the 1948 Arab–Israeli War and thereafter "there was a catchphrase of 'pushing the Jews into the sea' and the phrase, 'from the river to the sea' echoes that trope in a menacing way."

Steven Lubet wrote in an opinion piece on The Hill that if the people promoting this slogan were really interested only in "freedom, human rights and peaceful coexistence" as they claim, then they would have changed the slogan to "From the river to the sea, Palestinians will be free." Lubet also says that, according to DEI norms, the racism of a certain speech can be determined not only by the intent of the speaker, but mainly by the impact it has on the people who feel offended or threatened by it. Therefore, he concludes, since most Jews view the slogan as hurtful and threatening, it should be avoided, regardless of what is the real intent of its chanters.

According to Susie Linfield in an interview in Salmagundi magazine, there is nothing wrong with both Jews and Palestinians "pursuing national self-determination". In her opinion, the slogan 'from the river to the sea' represents a rejectionist unwillingness to compromise with the other nation on a two-state solution, which led the Palestinian leadership to reject the partition plan in 1947, leading to the Nakba, a catastrophe for their people.

On 9 November 2023, Claudine Gay, the president of Harvard University at the time, condemned the phrase. On 17 April 2024, Minouche Shafik, the president of Columbia University at the time, said that she herself hears the phrase as antisemitic, but some people do not.

Historian Richard Wolin said that the phrase "implicitly underwrites the elimination of 9 million Israelis by whatever means necessary..."

=== Response to criticism ===
Researcher and former negotiator in Israeli–Palestinian peace process Ahmad Samih Khalidi has responded to criticism which characterizes the phrase as genocidal, "It is perfectly possible for both people to be free between the river and the sea, is 'free' necessarily in itself genocidal? I think any reasonable person would say no. Does it preclude the fact that the Jewish population in the area between the sea and the river cannot also be free? I think any reasonable person would also say no."

Palestinian American writers such as Yousef Munayyer and historian Maha Nassar have written that accusations that the phrase is a call to genocide, rely on racist and Islamophobic assumptions about Palestinian intent. Anthropologist Nadia Abu El Haj notes that critics who characterize it as "threatening", "intimidating", or a call to "genocidal violence" when it is used in support of Palestine do not make equivalent claims when such language is used by Israelis.

In describing the criticism of the phrase, scholar of politics in the Arab world Elliott Colla writes:

It is the first phrase of the slogan—"from the river to the sea"—that has caused so much fury. Dominant Jewish communal institutions, most prominently the ADL and AJC, have insisted that this phrase is antisemitic. Throughout recent years, they have composed new definitions of antisemitism that render many common expressions of Palestine solidarity as ipso facto instances of anti-Jewish hate speech ... the slogan "from the river to the sea" figures prominently in their accusations of antisemitic doublespeak.

In 2021, over 200 scholars in various fields signed the Jerusalem Declaration on Antisemitism. The declaration discussed common manifestations of antisemitism, as well as what kinds of speech and behavior are antisemitic and what kind of speech and behavior are not, especially regarding the Palestine-Israel conflict. According to the declaration, "It is not antisemitic to support arrangements that accord full equality to all inhabitants 'between the river and the sea,' whether in two states, a binational state, unitary democratic state, federal state, or in whatever form."

Scholars Amos Goldberg and Alon Confino write in 2024, that it is not generally the case that the phrasing expresses a genocidal and antisemitic intention, instead historical usage articulates political strategies for Palestinian liberation.

== Legal status ==
As of 2026, the phrase "From the river to the sea" is generally legal in most of the world though its use has become legally constricted in some places, including Bavaria, Germany and Queensland, Australia. Supporters of the restrictions argue that the intent is antisemitic or is calling for a genocide of Jewish people, while opponents reject this interpretation and say that it is used to advocate for Palestinians to have the "freedom to establish their own state" and to demand the end of Israeli occupation. Legal authorities and courts have taken differing approaches on whether the phrase is to be criminalised or not.

=== Europe ===
==== United Kingdom ====
Following the 2023 Hamas attack on Israel, the British Home Secretary at the time, Suella Braverman, proposed prosecuting those using the phrase in certain contexts.

==== Netherlands ====
A majority of the Dutch parliament declared the phrase to be a call for violence. The judiciary, however, ruled in August 2023 that the phrase was protected on free speech grounds, being "subject to various interpretations", including those that "relate to the state of Israel and possibly to people with Israeli citizenship, but do not relate to Jews because of their race or religion". The decision was later upheld by the Dutch Supreme Court. In May 2024, a parliamentary motion calling for the criminalization of the slogan passed with a single-vote majority. As a result, prosecutions for inciting violence and hate speech when using the slogan are theoretically possible; however, prosecutions remain difficult in practice.

==== Austria ====
In October 2023, Vienna police banned a pro-Palestinian demonstration, citing the inclusion of the phrase "from the river to the sea" in invitations, as a justification. Politicians in Austria have also considered declaring use of the phrase to be a criminal offense, with Austrian chancellor Karl Nehammer saying that the phrase would be interpreted as a call for murder.

==== Estonia ====
In November 2023, in Tallinn (Estonia), the police opened criminal proceedings against five rally participants who used "From the river to the sea, Palestine will be free".

==== Germany ====
The phrase was banned in Bavaria (Germany) in November 2023, and "the prosecutor's office and the Bavarian police warned that henceforth its use, regardless of language, will be considered as the use of symbols of terrorist organizations. This may result in punishment of up to three years in prison or a fine". Despite a report issued in January 2024 by CNN, the phrase was not considered illegal all over Germany. On 22 March 2024 the Administrative Court of Hesse ruled against an interdiction by the Frankfurt municipality and allowed the phrase in the course of a demonstration the same day.

In November 2025, the Higher Administrative Court of Münster ruled that the police cannot prohibit protesters in expressing criticism of the state of Israel or questioning its "right to exist" during demonstrations. It clarified that these actions, as well as "advocating for peaceful changes" to the political situation, falls within protected free speech.

==== Czech Republic ====
In November 2023, the Ministry of the Interior of the Czech Republic expressed the opinion that the use of the phrase may be considered criminal. This view was, however, rejected after multiple appeals in August 2024 by the Supreme Administrative Court of the Czech Republic, which explained that any use of the phrase must be evaluated in context, is not criminal in itself, and that its use on an invitation cannot be a reason to ban an announced public gathering.

==== France ====
In April 2026, French MP Caroline Yadan introduced the Yadan bill, which would criminalize the phrase in France.

=== North America ===
==== Canada ====
In November 2023, it was reported that the case of a man charged by the police in Calgary, Canada for using the phrase, had been stayed.

==== United States ====
In April 2024, the U.S. House of Representatives passed a resolution condemning the phrase as antisemitic, with 377 in favor, 44 against, and 1 absent. The resolution stemmed from controversy surrounding Rashida Tlaib's video post featuring the phrase. Tlaib, who voted against the resolution, defended the phrase as aspirational for freedom. While some Democrats viewed the resolution as divisive, many supported it due to concerns about antisemitism.

US courts have generally treated the phrase as protected speech under the First Amendment when used within a political protest context. Courts have rejected the idea that critics can assign it a single fixed meaning and have emphasized its interpretation is dependent on context.

=== Oceania ===
==== Australia ====
In March 2026, Queensland, Australia passed a law banning people from written or spoken use of the phrase "in a way that makes a member of the public feel menaced, harassed or offended", with penalties of up to two years in prison. On 11 March 2026, two activists, were arrested for using the phrase "from the river to the sea" at a rally outside Queensland parliament. On 28 March, Queensland Police stated that they were investigating artist James Hillier for a graffiti of singer John Farnham, and line from his 1988 song "Two Strong Hearts" which features the words "river to the sea", and a slice of watermelon.

== See also ==
- Borders of Israel
- A mari usque ad mare
- Anti-Zionism
- Israeli–Palestinian conflict
- Greater Israel
- Am Yisrael Chai
- "May Your Village Burn"
- A land without a people for a people without a land
- There was no such thing as Palestinians
- From Dan to Beersheba
