= Serpil =

- Gender: Feminine
- Language: Turkish

Origin
- Language: Turkish
- Origin: "Serpil"
- Derivation: "Serpil"

Serpil is a common feminine Turkish given name. Notable people with the name include:

== Given name ==
- Serpil Barlas (1957–2021), Turkish actress and singer
- Serpil Çapar (born 1981), Turkish handball player
- Serpil Gür, Turkish taekwondo practitioner
- Serpil İskenderoğlu (born 1982), Turkish handball player
- Serpil Kemalbay, Turkish politician
- Serpil Midyatli (born 1975), Turkish-German politician
- Serpil Senelmis, Australian broadcaster, journalist, and public speaker
- Serpil Timuray, Turkish chief executive
- Serpil Hamdi Tüzün, Turkish male football coach
- Serpil Yassıkaya, Turkish boxer
