= Transjordan =

Transjordan may refer to:

- Transjordan (region), an area to the east of the Jordan River
- Lordship of Transjordan, a Crusader lordship (1118–1187)
- Emirate of Transjordan, British protectorate (1921–1946)
- Hashemite Kingdom of Transjordan, a former name (1946–1949) for the Hashemite Kingdom of Jordan

== See also ==
- Transjordan in the Bible, an area east of the Jordan River mentioned in the Hebrew Bible
- The East Bank of the Jordan (song), a song written by Ze'ev Jabotinsky
