= Serpil Senelmis =

Australian broadcaster and public speaker

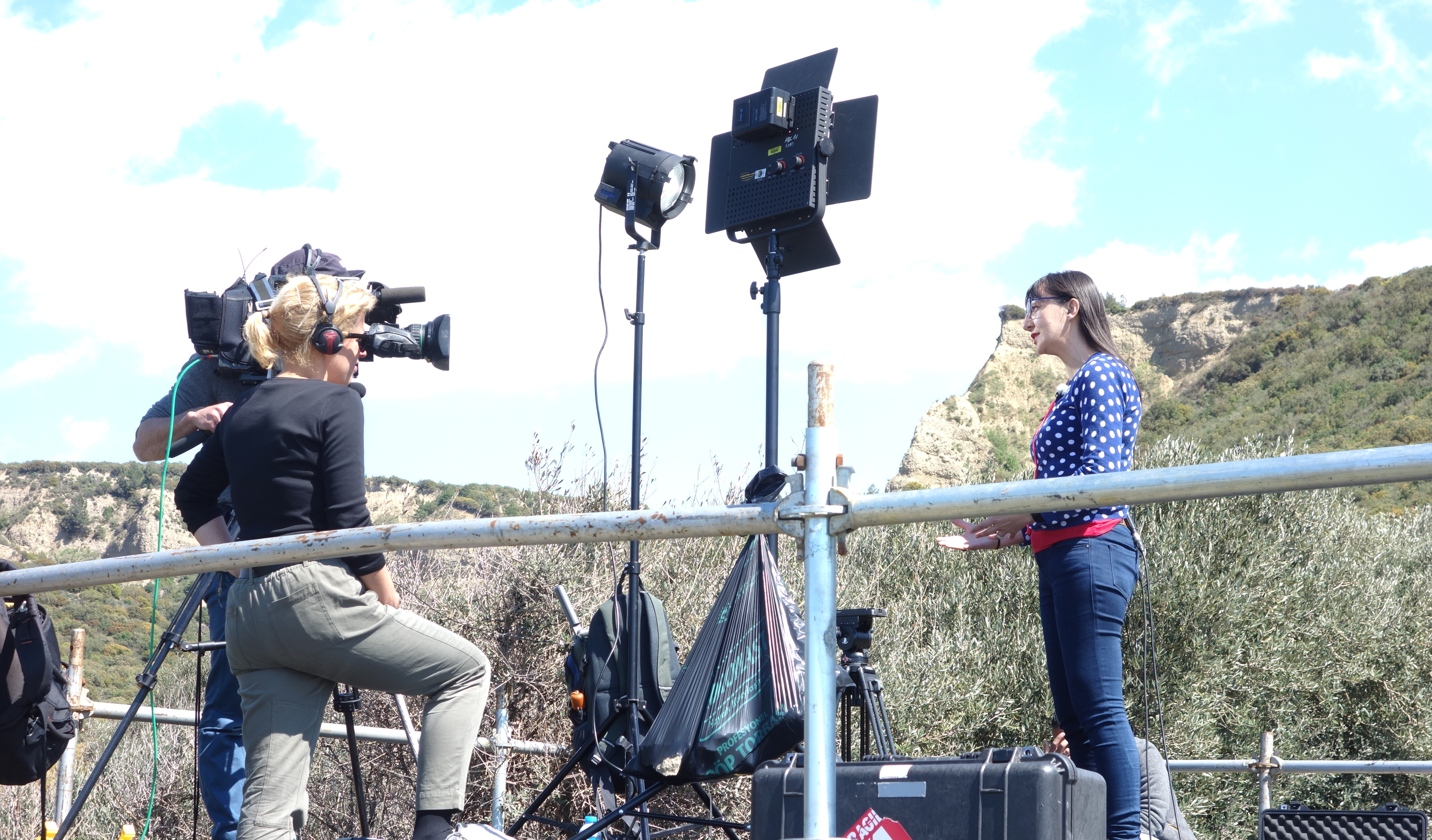
Senelmis reporting live to Australia from Gallipoli in 2015

Serpil Senelmis is an Australian broadcaster, journalist, and public speaker with Turkish heritage. She is known for her reporting on the Turkish perspective of the Gallipoli campaign in Australia, and worked as a radio producer for the ABC on Radio National and Triple J. As of 2024 Senelmis is co-founder and director of her own company, Written & Recorded, which provides services to help others promote their brands.

== Early years and education ==
Serpil Senelmis was born in Tatura, Victoria after her father, a cabinet-maker, came to Australia with her mother and eight-month-old sister from Nevsehir in Turkey in 1969.

She graduated from the Western Australian Academy of Performing Arts (WAAPA).

== Media career ==
After graduating from WAAPA, Senelmis worked as a print journalist for street press in Perth, including Xpress and Nova Holistic Journal.

Senelmis has often reported on the Turkish perspective of the Gallipoli campaign in Australia and spoken about it on Australian television, radio and public forums. She was part of the broadcast team at the Dawn Service in Gallipoli in 2014 and for the centenary of the Gallipoli Campaign ANZAC landings in 2015. Her documentary work has included a retrospective look at Turkish music from the 1960s and coverage of the Turkish history of the Gallipoli Campaign.

Senelmis was senior radio producer with Radio National and a presenter on Local Radio. As a radio producer, Senelmis has worked with Jon Faine, Helen Razer, Derryn Hinch, Waleed Aly, singer Clare Bowditch, and comedians Nazeem Hussain and Tony Moclair. She had a long working career with John Safran and Father Bob Maguire as the producer of Sunday Night Safran on Triple J. She also produced Sunday Extra with Jonathan Green on Radio National.

As a radio presenter Senelmis highlighted topics and people that are often overlooked, such as the art and activism of young Indian woman Kaanchi Chopra.

As of 2024 Senelmis is director of Written & Recorded, which she co-founded with James Brandis. The company comprises a team of journalists, producers, audio engineers, and communications experts who offer services to promote brands through such means as podcasting and effective writing.

== Other activities ==
Senelmis has hosted panel discussions and public forums on a wide variety of topics with The Wheeler Centre, including Race and Dating, Judy Horacek's cartoons, and the Turkish perspective of the Gallipoli Campaign. She has also hosted an event at the Feminist Writers Festival.

She has been a regular guest on The Conversation Hour with Jon Faine on ABC Radio Melbourne.

== Recognition ==
Her documentary work has been cited in the peer-reviewed journal Contemporary Review of the Middle East.

== Personal life ==
As a first-generation Australian, Senelmis feels a strong connection to her birth country Australia and her parents homeland Turkey.

She enjoys running and is a volunteer with Parkrun in Melbourne
