= Palestinian American Congress =

US-based non-profit established in 1979

The Palestinian American Congress (Arabic: الكونغرس الفلسطيني الأمريكي) is a Palestinian-American non-profit grassroots organization established in 1979 to assist the Palestinian-American community in coordinating and organizing its political, educational, cultural and social affairs and supporting the Palestinian cause. It is headquartered in Chicago.

It was formed in 1979 following discussions by 400 Palestinian Americans.

In 1997, the organization hosted Yasser Arafat for a dinner during a trip to the US to meet President Bill Clinton. At the dinner Arafat noted that "the Israeli plan to build homes in East Jerusalem" violated the Oslo Accords between the two countries and were aimed at further dividing the West Bank. In 2000 the San Francisco chapter hosted Hassan Abdel Rahman at a dinner held at the Arab Cultural Center of San Francisco in which Rahman spoke on the history of Palestinian and Israel peace negotiations. In 2003 the organization commemorated the 55th anniversary of Al-Nakba with a panel discussion and art exhibition at Rutgers University; the latter featuring sculptures by Rajie Cook. Members of the panel included scholars Naseer Aruri and Ziva Flamhaft, and Abdel Hamid Siyam of the United Nations Department of Public Information.

As of July 2008, it had 21 chapters in various US cities.
