= Mohammed Ayoob =

American academic

Mohammed Ayoob (born 1942) is a Distinguished Professor of International Relations at Michigan State University's James Madison College and the Department of Political Science. He is also Coordinator of the Muslim Studies Program at Michigan State University. Within international relations theory he is known for this theory of subaltern realism.

== Subaltern realism ==
Ayoob first proposed his theory of subaltern realism in the 1980s and further developed it in the 1990s.

The theory is a critical rejoinder to the neorealism of Kenneth Waltz and others, including the domestic analogies that neorealism employs.

It aims to provide an analytical tool for grasping the major determinants of Third World state behavior, the dominant concerns of Third World state elites, and the root causes of conflict in the Third World. The theory emphasizes the divergence of Third World conditions from those of industrialized core states, and has gone on to criticize mainstream International Relations theory for excluding the Third World. It proposes an alternative conceptualization of security and emphasizes the inequality in IR theorizing.

=== Principles ===
The subaltern realism theory advocates that third world states are generally weak, and are often economically and militarily dependent on external benefactors, mostly industrialized states. Therefore, third world states are more concerned with relative gains and short-term benefits than long-term benefits and absolute gains.

Additionally, third world states interactions are limited to their immediate neighborhood, especially in the security sphere, and as such they will choose to interact with other states who possess similar characteristics. They are therefore much less concerned with security matters of an international level.

David Dreyer has also written on the subject.
