= Yousef Munayyer =

Palestinian-American writer and political analyst

- يوسف منيّر
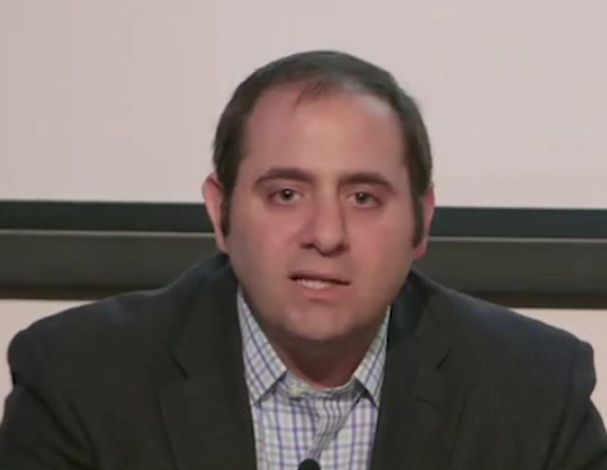
- Yousef Munayyer, 2015
- Education: University of Maryland (Ph.D.)
- Occupations: Political analyst, scholar, writer, commentator

Yousef Munayyer (Arabic: يوسف منيّر) is a Palestinian-American writer and political analyst based in Washington, D.C., United States. He was the executive director of the US Campaign for Palestinian Rights. Previously he directed The Jerusalem Fund for Education and Community Development and its educational program, the Palestine Center and was also a policy analyst with the American-Arab Anti-Discrimination Committee.

== Early life and education ==
Munayyer was born in the town of Lod, Israel into a Palestinian Christian family, and spent the majority of his early life in New Jersey. Munayyer holds a Ph.D in Government and Politics from the University of Maryland. He also holds a BA in Political Science and History from the University of Massachusetts Amherst, and a MA in Government and Politics from the University of Maryland. His academic research interests include political repression and the intersection of foreign policy and civil liberties.

== Career ==
Munayyer has been a leading advocate for Palestinian rights and is widely published on issues relating to Palestine, Israel, the broader Middle East as well as the civil liberties of Arab and Muslim Americans. His writings have appeared in every major metropolitan newspaper in the United States and in edited volumes, and he has appeared on numerous national and international television and radio programs to discuss the Middle East and Palestine. He has spoken on a number of policy panels and is often invited to speak on the Middle East and Israel/Palestine at Universities and Colleges.

In 2015, he appeared on a list of the "100 Most Powerful Arabs Under 40" at number 16.

In 2023, Munayyer wrote that the Biden administration had ignored the Palestinian issue.

He is fluent in Arabic and English.

== Personal life ==
Munayyer is married to a Palestinian from Nablus in the West Bank. They met in Massachusetts during college and now live near Washington, D.C.
