= Armin Pfahl-Traughber =

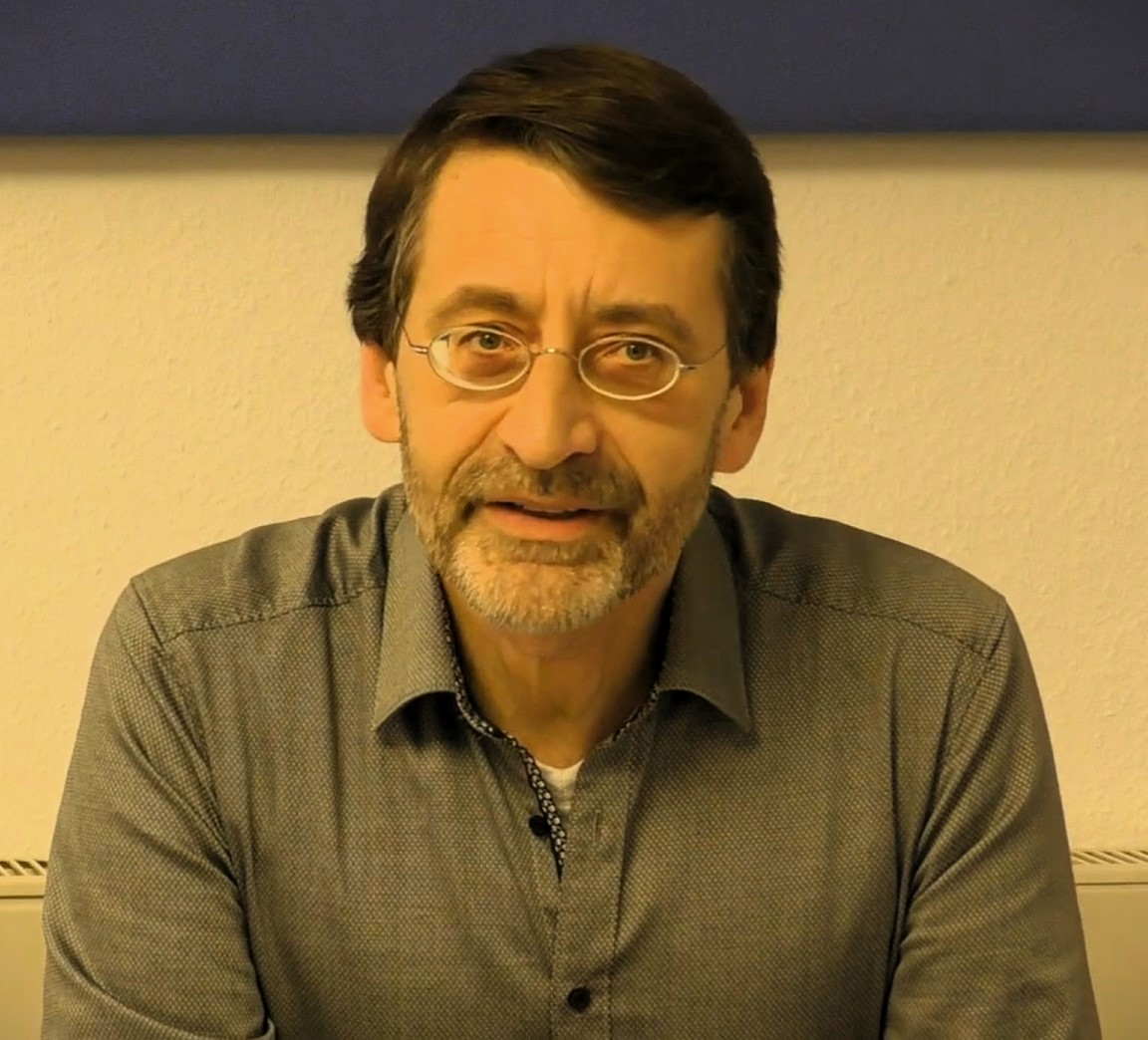
Pfahl-Traughber speaks in 2018.

Armin Pfahl-Traughber (born 1963) is a German political scientist, sociologist and government official. He is professor of political science at the Federal University of Applied Administrative Sciences in Germany and is a former director of the office for far-right extremism in the Federal Office for the Protection of the Constitution. He is an expert on far-right and far-left political extremism, terrorism, antisemitism and the history of ideas. He is editor of the Jahrbuch für Extremismus- und Terrorismusforschung (Yearbook of Extremism and Terrorism Research).

== Career ==
He studied political science and sociology at the University of Duisburg and the University of Marburg; he received a scholarship from the Friedrich Naumann Foundation and earned his PhD in 1992 with a dissertation on antisemitic and antimasonic conspiracy theories in the Weimar Republic and Nazi Germany; his doctoral advisor was Julius H. Schoeps. He then taught at the University of Marburg.

From 1994 to 2004 he was a research fellow and director in the office for far-right extremism in the Federal Office for the Protection of the Constitution. He also taught at the University of Cologne from 1998 to 2004, and was appointed as professor of political science at the Federal University of Applied Administrative Sciences in 2004. He has also taught at the University of Bonn since 2007, and at the Academy of the Federal Office for the Protection of the Constitution.

== Selected works ==
- Konservative Revolution und Neue Rechte: Rechtsextremistische Intellektuelle gegen den demokratischen Verfassungsstaat, Leske & Budrich, Opladen 1998, ISBN 3-8100-1888-0
- Linksextremismus in Deutschland: Eine kritische Bestandsaufnahme. Springer VS, Wiesbaden 2014, ISBN 978-3-658-04506-7.
- Rechtsextremismus in Deutschland: Eine kritische Bestandsaufnahme. Springer VS, Wiesbaden 2019, ISBN 978-3-658-24275-6.
- Die AfD und der Rechtsextremismus: Eine Analyse aus politikwissenschaftlicher Perspektive. Springer VS, Wiesbaden 2019, ISBN 978-3-658-25179-6.
