= Batil =

Arabic word meaning falsehood or invalid act

Batil (Arabic: باطل) is an Arabic word meaning falsehood, and can be used to describe a nullified or invalid act or contract according to the sharia.

In contract law, the opposite of batil is sahih. Batil can be distinguished from fasid ("defective") in that a fasid contract might go through completion, whereas a batil contract would not.
