= Contemporary Review of the Middle East =

- Discipline: Economics, Development Studies and Politics
- Language: English
- Edited by: P R Kumaraswamy

Publication details
- History: Mar 2014
- Publisher: Sage Publications India Pvt. Ltd.
- Frequency: Quarterly
- Impact factor: 0.7

Standard abbreviations
- ISO 4: Contemp. Rev. Middle East

Indexing
- ISSN: 2347-7989 (print); 2349-0055 (web)

Links
- Journal homepage; Online access; Online archive

The Contemporary Review of the Middle East is a peer-reviewed forum that publishes original research articles that analyze contemporary Middle Eastern developments in the fields of security, politics, economy, and culture.

The journal is published four times a year by Sage with a primary focus on contemporary developments. It is edited by P R Kumaraswamy.

This journal is a member of the Committee on Publication Ethics (COPE).

== Abstracting and indexing ==
Contemporary Review of the Middle East is abstracted and indexed in:

- Clarivate Analytics: Emerging Sources Citation Index (ESCI)
- DeepDyve
- Dutch-KB
- EBSCO
- J-Gate
- OCLC
- Ohio
- Portico
- ProQuest: IBSS
- RePEc
- SCOPUS
- UGC-CARE (GROUP II)
