= Supreme Headquarters of the National Liberation Army of Yugoslavia =

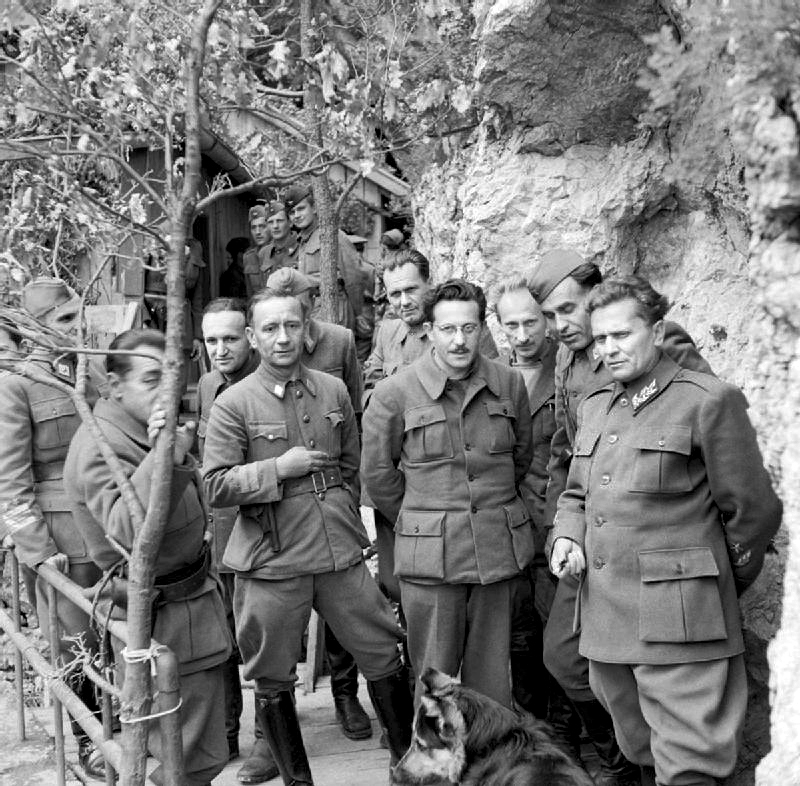
Tito (far right) and members of the Supreme Headquarters in front of the Tito's cave in Drvar on 14 May 1944, days before Operation Rösselsprung.

The Supreme Headquarters was created in June 1941 by the Central Committee of the Yugoslav Communist Party after the German-led Axis invasion of Yugoslavia of 6 April 1941. It was the main command and staff body of the Yugoslav Partisans, with Josip Broz Tito at its Supreme Commander and Arso Jovanović as its Chief.

Initially titled Partisan Chief Headquarters when it was created on 27 June 1941, it was renamed at the Stolice conference of 26–27 September 1941. Its full name became the Supreme Headquarters of the National Liberation Partisan Detachments. From January 1942, the headquarters became the Supreme Headquarters of the National Liberation Partisan and Volunteer Army of Yugoslavia to allow for the incorporation of "Volunteer Detachments" consisting of insurgents that were not willing to formally become Partisans, most of whom were Serb nationalist Chetniks. By November 1942, this experiment had clearly failed, and it was again renamed the Supreme Headquarters of the National Liberation Army and Partisan Detachments of Yugoslavia. Finally, on 1 March 1945, it became the General Staff of the Yugoslav Army (renamed Yugoslav People's Army in 1951).

The composition of the Supreme Headquarters during the war was successively supplemented, as few members died. Members of Supreme Headquarters throughout the war were: Josip Broz Tito (supreme commander), Arso Jovanović (chief of Supreme Headquarters), Velimir Terzić (deputy chief of Supreme Headquarters), Sreten Žujović, Edvard Kardelj, Aleksandar Ranković, Ivo Lola Ribar (died in November 1943), Svetozar Vukmanović, Milovan Đilas, Ivan Milutinović (died in October 1944), Peko Dapčević, Savo Orović, Sava Kovačević (died in June 1943), Vladimir Popović, Radivoje Jovanović, Vlada Zečević, Petar Drapšin, Rade Hamović, Vojislav Đokić, Franc Leskošek, Uglješa Danilović, Mihailo Apostolski, Nikola Grulović, Pavle Ilić, Moša Pijade, Rade Končar (died in May 1942), Gojko Nikoliš, Izidor Papo, Ivan Rukavina, Pavle Savić, Vladimir Smirnov and Ivan Maček.

== See also ==
- Main Staff of the National Liberation Army and Partisan Detachments of Serbia
