= Main Staff of the National Liberation Army and Partisan Detachments of Serbia =

- Главни штаб Народноослободилачке војске и партизанских одреда Србије / Glavni štab Narodnooslobodilačke vojske i partizanskih odreda Srbije
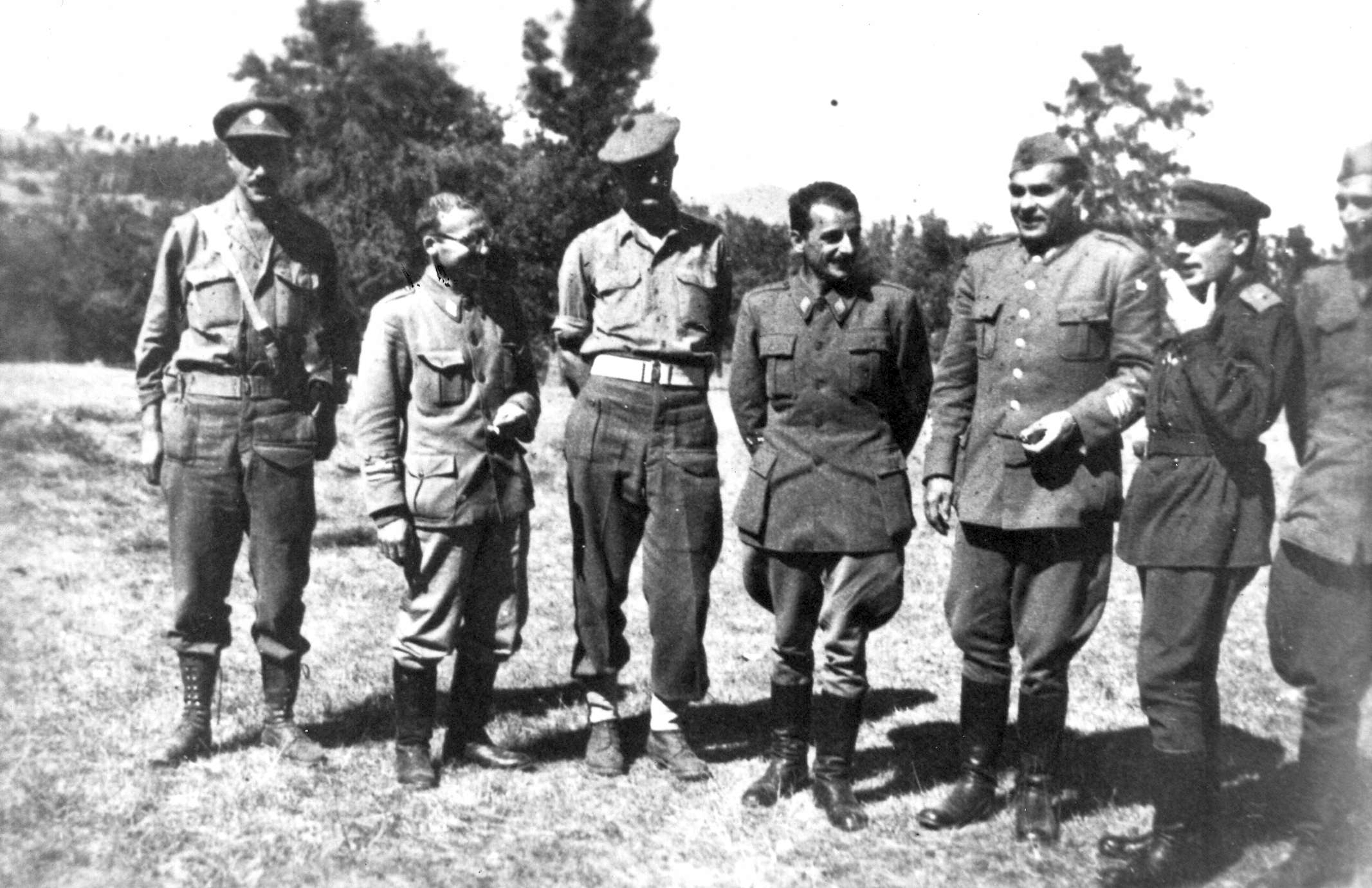
- The Main Staff with foreign representatives on the Radan mountain in 1944.
- Formation: 4 July 1941
- Founded at: Belgrade
- Dissolved: 1945
- Parent organization: Provincial Committee for Serbia

The Main Staff of the National Liberation Army and Partisan Detachments of Serbia was the highest military organ that organized and commanded the units of the Yugoslav Partisans (the "National Liberation Army") on the territory of German-occupied Serbia (central Serbia) during World War II (1941–45).

Established on 4 July 1941 in Belgrade by the Provincial Committee for Serbia (PKS), the following were appointed members of staff: Sreten Žujović as commander (komandant), Nikola Grulović, Filip Kljajić, Branko Krsmanović and Rodoljub Čolaković as members of staff. All staff members left Belgrade on 8 July and entered the territories of Šumadija and Pomoravlje, while PKS stayed in Belgrade. The emergence of the Main Staff was very important for the directing of the Partisan Detachments and District Committees of the Communist Party of Yugoslavia.

== See also ==
- Main National Liberation Committee for Serbia
- Anti-fascist Assembly for the National Liberation of Serbia

== Annotations ==
1. Serbo-Croatian: Главни штаб Народноослободилачке војске и партизанских одреда Србије / Glavni štab Narodnooslobodilačke vojske i partizanskih odreda Srbije, shortened Главни штаб НОВ и ПО Србије / Glavni štab NOV i PO Srbije. It was established as the Штаб Народноослободилачких партизанских одреда Србије / Štab Narodnooslobodilačkih partizanskih odreda Srbije, then renamed Главни штаб Народноослободилачких партизанских одреда Србије / Glavni štab Narodnooslobodilačkih partizanskih odreda Srbije, receiving its final name in early 1943.

== Sources ==
- Borković, Milan (1976). Србија у рату и револуцији 1941-1945. Srpska književna zadruga.
- Glišić, Venceslav; Borković, Milan (1974). Komunistička partija Jugoslavije u Srbiji 1941-1945: 1941-1942. Rad.
- Kadenić, Rahmija; Petković, Radomir (1981). Ratna sećanja iz NOB, 1941-1942. Vol. 1. Vojnoizdavački zavod. p. 147.
- Pantelić, Ivan (1988). Руковођење народноослободилачком борбом и револуцијом у Србији 1941-1945. Belgrade: Vojnoizdavački i novinski centar.
- Vukotić, Jovo D. (1981). Stvaranje i uređenje slobodnih teritorija u NOR-u. IRO "Privredna štampa". p. 20.
- Vojnoistorijski institut (1955). Zbornik dokumenata i podataka o narodnooslobodilačkom ratu naroda Jugoslavija. Vol. 1. Belgrade: Vojnoistorijski institut.
