= Provincial Committee for Serbia =

Communist Party of Yugoslavia branch

The Provincial Committee for Serbia (Serbian Cyrillic: Покрајински комитет за Србију, romanized: Pokrajinski komitet za Srbiju, abbr. PKS) or Provincial Committee of Serbia (Serbian Cyrillic: Покрајински комитет Србије, romanized: Pokrajinski komitet Srbije) was the branch of the Communist Party of Yugoslavia (KPJ) active in Serbia during the Kingdom of Yugoslavia and German-occupied Serbia in World War II. It was transformed into the Communist Party of Serbia on 8 May 1945.

== History ==
=== World War II ===
On 4 July 1941, the PKS established the Main Staff of the National Liberation Army and Partisan Detachments of Serbia.

In 1941, the PKS greatly aided the communists in western Serbia. Communist Party members were sent to areas in need of political activity. The Central Committee for Liberated Territory was established in the short-lived Republic of Užice in western German-occupied Serbia. The reformed Provincial Committee for Serbia, set up in November 1942, established 12 new county- and district committees.

== Bibliography ==
- Institut za istoriju radničkog pokreta Srbije (1972). NOR i revolucija u Srbiji, 1941-1945: naučni skup posvećen 30-godišnjici ustanka, održan na Zlatiboru 25-26 septembra 1971. Institut za istoriju radničkog pokreta Srbije.
- Glišić, Venceslav; Borković, Milan (1975). Komunistička partija Jugoslavije u Srbiji 1941-1945: 1941-1942. Rad.
