= Vlada Zečević =

Serbian Orthodox priest and communist politician (1903–1970)

Vladimir Vlada Zečević Владимир Влада Зечевић
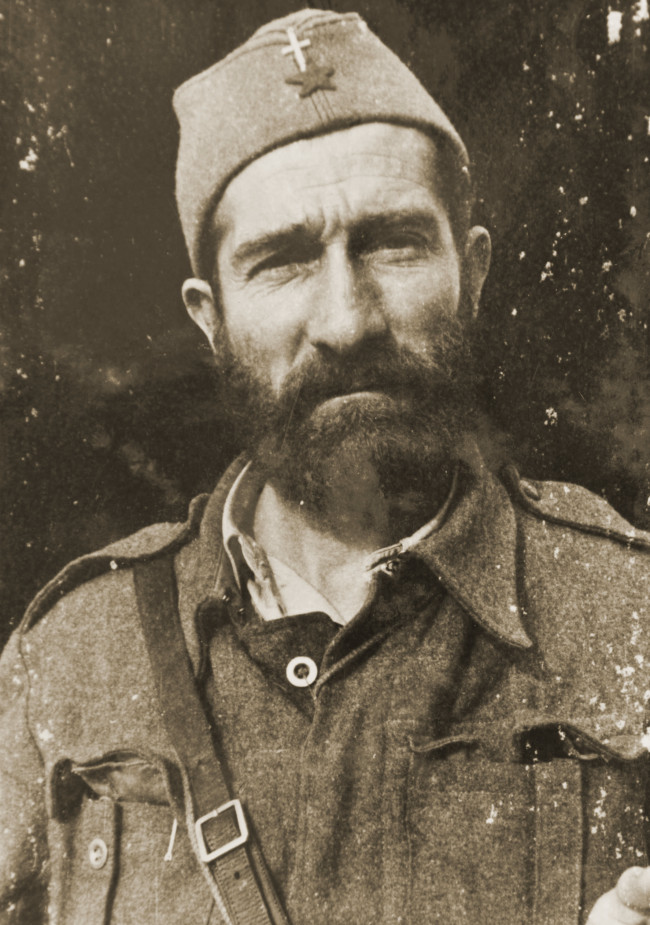
- Zečević in 1942

1st Minister of the Interior of FPR Yugoslavia
- In office 7 March 1945 – 2 February 1946
- President: Josip Broz Tito
- Preceded by: Position established
- Succeeded by: Aleksandar Ranković

Personal details
- Born: March 21, 1903 Loznica, Kingdom of Serbia
- Died: October 26, 1970 (aged 67) Belgrade, Serbia, Yugoslavia
- Party: Communist Party of Yugoslavia
- Occupation: Priest, politician

Military service
- Allegiance: Yugoslavia; Yugoslavia
- Branch/service: Royal Yugoslav Army; Chetniks; Yugoslav Partisans
- Years of service: 1941–1945
- Rank: Political commissar
- Battles/wars: World War II in Yugoslavia

Vladimir "Vlada" Zečević (Serbian Cyrillic: Владимир Влада Зечевић; 21 March 1903 (OS) – 26 October 1970) was a Serbian Orthodox priest and later a member of the League of Communists of Yugoslavia and the Yugoslav Partisans during World War II who served as the first post-WWII Minister of the Interior of Yugoslavia from 7 March 1945 to 2 February 1946.

== Biography ==
Zečević was born in Loznica, on 25 March 1903. He graduated from the University of Belgrade's Faculty of Theology. From 1927 to 1941 he served as a parish priest in Krupanj, whereupon he became invested in the political life, ardently supporting the opposition.

After the Invasion of Yugoslavia in 1941 by the Axis powers, Zečević voluntarily joined the Royal Yugoslav Army. He was, at first, affiliated with the Chetniks but, following the siege on Šabac, he defected to the Yugoslav Partisans together with lieutenant Ratko Martinović, alongside five hundred other Chetnik soldiers.

In November 1941, during the short-lived liberated territory in Western Serbia, known as Republic of Užice, he was a member of the newly established Main National Liberation Committee for Serbia responsible for Trade, supplies, forestry and mining.

He joined the League of Communists of Yugoslavia in 1942 and went on to serve as a political commissar deputy of the Valjevo Partisan Unit, a member of the AVNOJ's Executive Board, a commissioner of the Denominational Department during the First AVNOJ Session and a commissioner of internal affairs during the World War II.

Having survived the war, Zečević served as Minister of the Interior of Yugoslavia from 1945 to 1946; as Minister of Construction, Transportation and Infrastructure of the PR Serbia from 1952 to 1953 and as president of the Yugoslav Parliament from 1954 to 1960.

Zečević died in Belgrade on 26 October 1970, where he was also buried.

== Bibliography ==
Zečević authored three books, all published in the 1960s, respectively titled An Encounter in the Dark (Belgrade, 1963), The More You Know (Belgrade, 1968) and Insurgency Growing (Zagreb, 1968).

== Sources ==
- Mladenović, Stanko (1975). Pop Vlada Zečević. Beograd: Rad. COBISS 117476103
- Roberts, Walter. Tito, Mihailovic and the Allies 1941 - 1945. Duke Univ. Press, 1994.
- Steinberg, S. H. The Statesman's Year-Book: Statistical and Historical Annual of the States of the World for the Year 1950. Macmillan, 1950
