= Main National Liberation Committee for Serbia =

1940s Serbian political organization

The Main National Liberation Committee for Serbia (Serbian: Главни народноослободилачки одбор за Србију/Glavni narodnooslobodilački odbor za Srbiju) was the body of the "National Liberation Movement" (the Yugoslav Communists and Yugoslav Partisans) in German-occupied Serbia, recognized within the movement as the civilian government in Serbia. It was established in October or November 1941, active during the Republic of Užice, a short-lived liberated territory in western Serbia in the second half of 1941, and in 1944–45 during the liberation of Yugoslavia.

According to V. Vinterhalter, the "Main National Liberation Committee for Serbia" was established on 16 November in liberated Užice. A letter issued by Tito on 16 November stresses that a "Central Committee for all of the liberated territory ... had now been established" in Užice. The organization was thus called the Central Committee for Liberated Territory (Centralni odbor za oslobođenu teritoriju). The Central Committee of the Communist Party of Yugoslavia (CK KPJ) appointed the Committee on 17 November. Its establishment had been initiated by the leadership of the National Liberation Movement for Serbia, with consent of the National Liberation Movement of Yugoslavia (NOP Jugoslavije, the war-time KPJ). The President was Dragojlo Dudić, and Secretary was Petar Stambolić. The organization did not hold any official assemblies. The organization became defunct with the renewed German occupation, only to resurface in November 1944 as the "Main National Liberation Committee for Serbia" (Serbo-Croatian: Glavni NOO Srbije).

== Organization ==
=== Members ===
1941

The President was Dragojlo Dudić, and Secretary was Petar Stambolić. Other members were Mitra Mitrović (Education and culture), Vlada Zečević (Trade, supplies, forestry and mining), Milentije Popović (Transport), Mirko Tomić (Health), Nikola Grulović, Mitar Bakić, Jovan Popović, and Jusuf Tuluć.

== See also ==
- Anti-fascist Assembly for the National Liberation of Serbia
- Provincial Committee for Serbia

== Annotations ==
- Also known in Serbo-Croatian as Glavni NOO Srbije or Glavni NOO za Srbiju. "NOO" is the acronym Narodnooslobodilački odbor ("National Liberation Committee").

== Sources ==
- Vujošević, Radomir (1985). Dokumenti centralnih organa KPJ NOR i revolucija (1941-1945): (16. septembar-31. decembar 1941). Izdavački centar Komunist.
- Vukotić, Jovo D. (1981). Stvaranje i uređenje slobodnih teritorija u NOR-u. IRO "Privredna štampa".
- Glišić, Venceslav; Borković, Milan (1975). Komunistička partija Jugoslavije u Srbiji 1941-1945: 1941-1942. Rad.
- NIN. Politika. 1988. p. 48.
- Bogdanović, Radomir (1979). Zapisnici Izvršnog narodnooslobodilačkog odbora grada Beograda od 26. X 1944. do 29. XI 1945. Izvršni narodnooslobodilački odbor grada Beograda, Istorijski arhiv Beograda. Istorijski arhiv.
- Mladenović, Stanko (1975). Pop Vlada Zečević. Beograd: Rad. COBISS 117476103
