= Republic of Užice =

Short-lived liberated territory in World War II

Republic of Užice Užička republika Ужичка република
- 1941
- Flag used by the Užice Partisan Detachment
- Anthem: None official^{[a]}
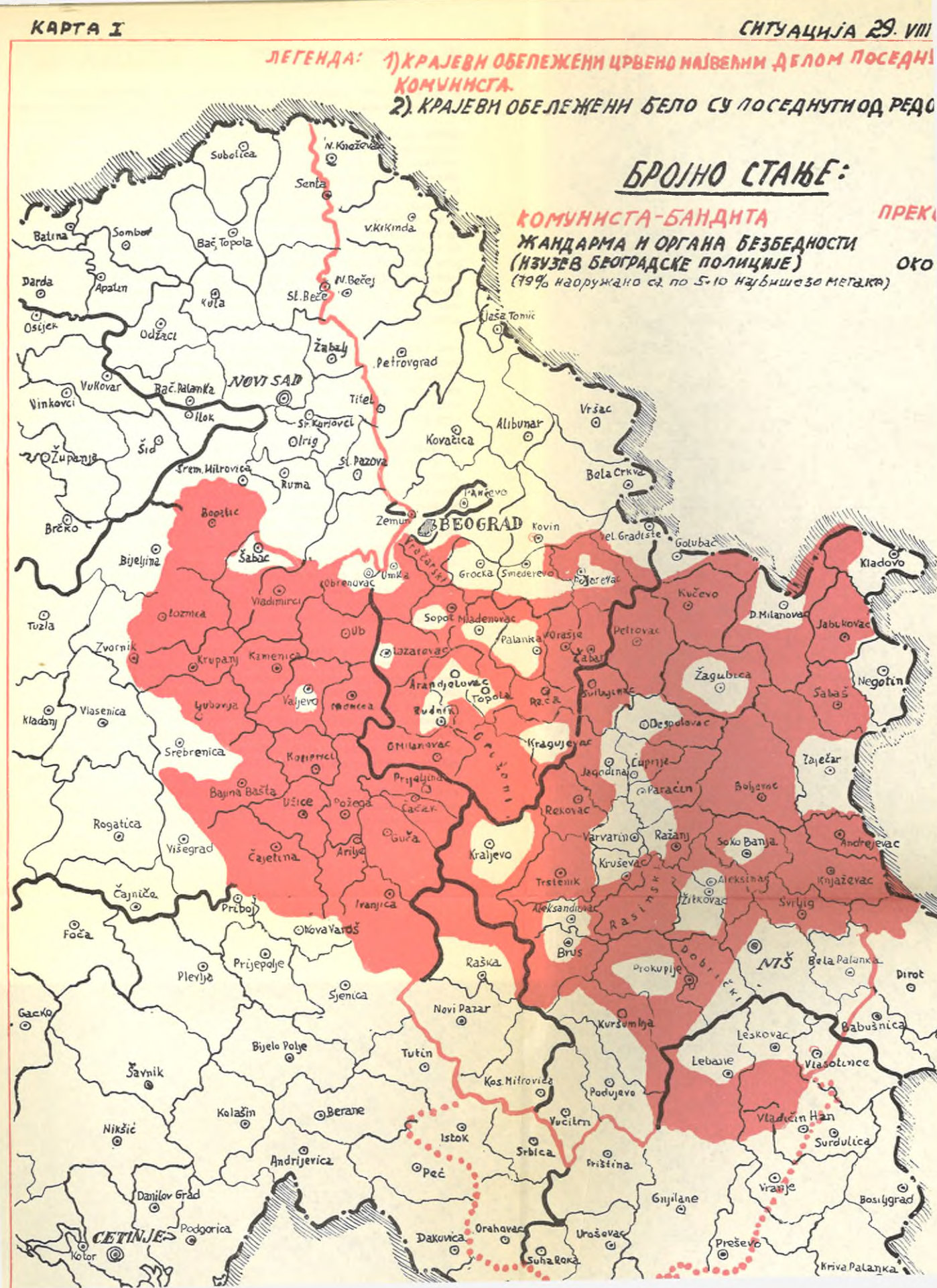
- Liberated and partially liberated territories in Axis-occupied Yugoslavia on 29 August 1941, marked in red
- Capital: Užice
- Common languages: Serbo-Croatian
- Chairman^{[b]}
- General Secretary^{[c]}
- Legislature: Main National Liberation Committee for Serbia
- Historical era: World War II
  - Partisan arrival in Užice: 28 July 1941
  - Battle of Drežnik: 18 August 1941
  - German ultimatum: 10 September 1941
  - Fall of Užice: 24 September 1941
  - Battle of Kadinjača: 29 November 1941
  - Conquered: 1 December 1941
Preceded by	Succeeded by
German-occupied Serbia	German-occupied Serbia
- Today part of: Serbia
- 1. There was no officially adopted anthem. Sa Ovčara i Kablara was a popular song on liberated territories around Užice, and was considered the unofficial anthem of this short-lived state. Himna Užičkoj Republici ("Anthem to the Republic of Užice") was created after the war.; 2. Chairman of the Main Peoples Council of Serbia.; 3. General Secretary of the Communist Party of Yugoslavia and Commander in Chief of the Partisans.

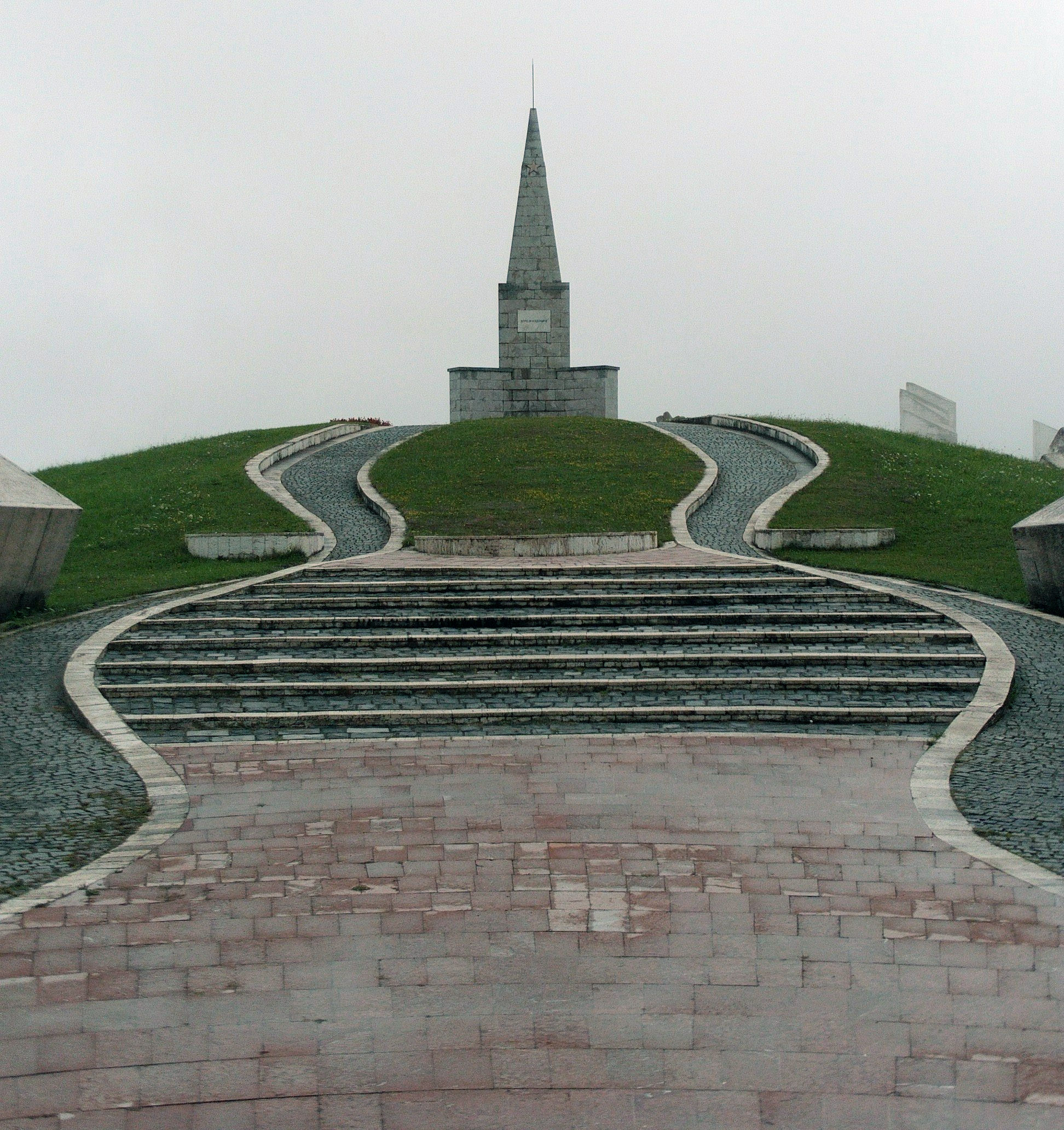
Monument to fallen partisans in battle on Kadinjača Hill.

The Republic of Užice or the Užice Republic (Serbo-Croatian: Užička republika / Ужичка република) was a short-lived liberated Yugoslav territory and the first liberated territory in World War II Europe, organized as a military mini-state that existed in the autumn of 1941 in occupied Yugoslavia, more specifically the western part of the Territory of the Military Commander in Serbia. (Note: Official name of the occupied territory) The Republic was established by the Partisan resistance movement and its administrative center was in the town of Užice.

== Borders ==
The Republic of Užice comprised a large portion of western part of the occupied territory and had a population of more than 300,000 (according to another source, nearly one million). It was located between the Valjevo–Bajina Bašta line in the north, the river Drina on the west, the river Zapadna Morava in the east, and the Raška region to the south.

Different sources provide differing information about the size of the republic: according to some sources, it included 15,000 or 20,000 square kilometres.

== History ==
The government was made of "people's councils" (odbori), and the partisans opened schools and published a newspaper, Borba (meaning "Fight"). They even managed to run a postal system and around 145 km of railway and operated an ammunition factory from the vaults beneath the bank in Užice.

In November 1941, in the First anti-Partisan offensive, the German troops occupied this territory again, while the majority of Partisan forces escaped towards Bosnia, Sandžak and Montenegro, re-grouping at Foča in Bosnia.

== End ==
The leftist policy then pursued by Josip Broz Tito (known later as the leftist errors) substantially contributed to the defeat of the partisans in the Republic of Užice. Because of the pro-fascist Serbian propaganda which described the partisans as being led by foreigners, the population of Serbia turned against the uprising and against the partisan insurgents. At the beginning of December 1941 the partisans moved from Serbia to Bosnia (nominally part of the NDH) and joined their comrades who had already left Montenegro.

== In popular culture ==
The 1974 Yugoslav partisan feature film The Republic of Užice covers the events surrounding the existence of the Republic of Užice.

== See also ==
- Republic of Bihać, a similar, albeit created 1 year later, republic in Bosnia and Herzegovina.
- Former countries in Europe after 1815

== Bibliography ==
- Banac, Ivo (1988). With Stalin Against Tito: Cominformist Splits in Yugoslav Communism. Cornell University Press. ISBN 0-8014-2186-1.
- Hehn, Paul N. (1971). "Serbia, Croatia and Germany 1941-1945: Civil War and Revolution in the Balkans". Canadian Slavonic Papers. 13 (4). University of Alberta: 344–373. doi:10.1080/00085006.1971.11091249.
- Pavlowitch, Stevan K. (2002). Serbia: The History behind the Name. London: Hurst & Company. ISBN 9781850654773.
