= Sreten Žujović =

Yugoslav politician

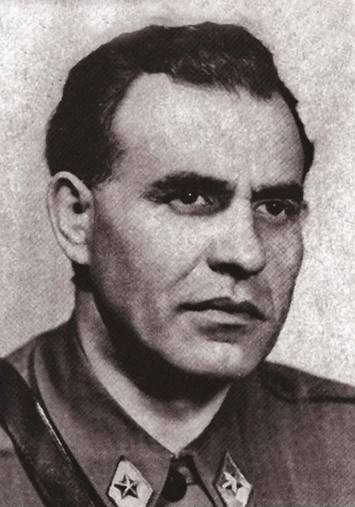
- Žujovič in September 1941

Minister of Finance of the SFRY
- In office 5 May 1945 – 8 March 1948
- Preceded by: Position established
- Succeeded by: Dobrivoje Radosavljević

Personal details
- Born: 24 June 1899 Mala Vrbica, Mladenovac, Kingdom of Serbia
- Died: 11 June 1976 (aged 76) Belgrade, SR Serbia, SFR Yugoslavia
- Party: Communist Party of Yugoslavia
- Education: Sorbonne; International Lenin School
- Profession: Lawyer
- Awards: Order of Kutuzov; All Yugoslav awards removed after 1948

Military service
- Commands: Main Staff of the National Liberation Army and Partisan Detachments of Serbia; Yugoslav Partisan Supreme Headquarters
- Battles/wars: First World War; Second World War

Sreten Žujović (Serbian Cyrillic: Сретен Жујовић; 24 June 1899 – 11 June 1976) was a Serbian and Yugoslav politician and veteran of World War I and long-time communist.

== Biography ==
He was born into a wealthy family, and was a Serb by nationality. In early childhood he moved to Belgrade, where he completed his primary and secondary education. At the start of the First World War, he was in Belgrade, but he did not join the Serbian army, but the French Foreign Legion, after which he was sent to the Western Front, where he fought against the German troops. After his return from the war, he became involved in the labor movement and organized trade unions.

Žujović first joined the Communist Party of Yugoslavia (KPJ) at the age of 25 in 1924 in Belgrade, and worked as an organizer there before becoming a secretary of the party. When the communists became a threat to the Kingdom of Yugoslavia, he was arrested and released but kept under surveillance by the police.

In 1933 Žujević left the Kingdom of Yugoslavia for the USSR where he became a recipient of a Communist scholarship in the Comintern school. Among the students at the school were his Belgrade colleagues, Rodoljub Čolaković and Milan Gorkić. Gorkić, the KPJ's general secretary, was summoned to Moscow in 1936 from Paris and upon his arrival was deposed and jailed in Lubyanka, only to be executed the following year, in 1937.

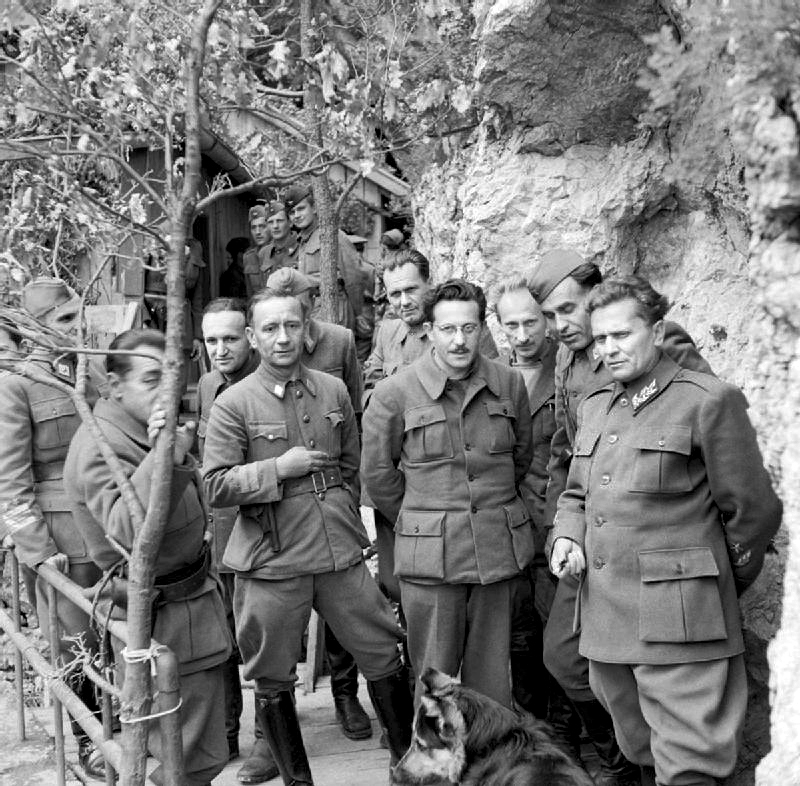
Sreten Žujović (behind Josip Broz Tito) in Drvar in May 1944

Žujović was a member of Yugoslav delegation at a United Nations Conference on International Organization. The delegates drew up the 111-article Charter, which was adopted unanimously on 25 June 1945 in the San Francisco Opera House.

He was a member of the Central Committee and the Politburo before World War II. He helped organize the Partisan uprising in Serbia in 1941 and became a member of the Supreme Staff. Minister of Finance in the postwar government, he lost his party membership and high office when he sided with Joseph Stalin against Josip Broz Tito in 1948 during the Informbiro period. He was put under house arrest and was then imprisoned. He was forced to conduct self-criticism and was eventually released from prison in 1950 and reinstated in the party.

== See also ==
- Informbiro
- Titoism
