= Joy Division (disambiguation) =

Joy Division was an English post-punk band, active 1976 to 1980, which took its name from the novel House of Dolls.

Joy Division may also refer to:

- Freudenabteilung ("Joy Division"), the name of the German camp brothels in World War II
- Kippumjo or "Joy Division," an alleged collective of females maintained by the head of state of North Korea for the purpose of providing pleasure and entertainment to officials
- Strength Through Joy, German Nazi-operated subsidized leisure activities and holidays organization

== Media ==
- House of Dolls, a 1955 Israeli novella exploring the World War II brothels.
- Joy Division (2006 film), a 2006 film about a German teenager during World War II who later becomes a KGB spy
- Joy Division (2007 film), a 2007 documentary film about the band Joy Division
- "Joy Division", a song by English girl group Sugababes on the 2005 album Taller in More Ways
- "Joy Division" (2019), an episode of the TV series Goliath

== See also ==
- Comfort women
- German camp brothels in World War II
