= Raid at Ožbalt =

Rescue of Allied prisoners of war in occupied Yugoslavia during World War II

The Raid at Ožbalt was the most successful known prison break of the Second World War. It was an operation on 31 August 1944 in which 105 Allied prisoners of war (POWs) were rescued by Slovene Partisans, Special Operations Executive (SOE), and MI9. The majority were liberated from a work site at the village of Ožbalt (German: St. Oswald an der Drau) about 25 kilometres (16 mi) west of Maribor on the railway line to Dravograd in the German Reichsgau Steiermark (Styria), now part of modern-day northern Slovenia. Six of the liberated POWs were separated from the group during an engagement with the Germans a few days after their liberation. One later reunited with the escape group. Following a 14-day trek across 250 kilometres (160 mi) they were flown out of a Partisan airfield at Semič to Bari, Italy. The successful escapees consisted of twenty Frenchmen, nine New Zealanders, twelve Australians, and fifty-nine British POWs.

Map of modern-day Slovenia showing the locations of Ožbalt and Semič

== Background ==
Allied POWs (with the exception of officers and airmen of the Western Allies) were used as laborers in working camps for various industries in the Third Reich. In 1941, there were a number of working camps administered by Stalag XVIII-D which was located in Maribor, Slovenia (German: Marburg an der Drau). By 1944, Stalag XVIII-D had been closed down, and its camps were administered by Stalag XVIII-A in Wolfsberg. The prisoners of Working Camp 1046/GW Prisoners lived in a barracks of the former Stalag XVIII-D camp, and were used for maintenance of the railway between Maribor and Dravograd (German: Unterdrauburg) which continued through the Drava valley and into Austria.

The representative of the prisoners in 1046/GW, known as the 'Man of Confidence' (German: Vertrauensmann), was Private Ralph Frederick Churches, an Australian Army infantry soldier of the 2/48th Battalion who had been on temporary duty with Headquarters ANZAC Corps when he was captured during the Allied withdrawal from Greece in April–May 1941. In early 1944, Churches and his second - 1046/GW translator Driver Leslie Arthur Laws, a British Army soldier of the 127th (Dorset) Electrical and Mechanical Engineers, Royal Engineers, agreed to cooperate on an escape attempt. Their hope was to contact Slovenian Partisans and break out while on the railway work site.

At this time, Slovenian Partisans were beginning to operate in force Štajerska (German: Untersteiermark). Partisans of the 4th Operational Zone had recently seized a number of towns along and near the Savinja river valley, creating a 'liberated zone'. In August, the three brigades of the 14th Partisan Division - the 1st Strike Brigade 'Tone Tomšič', 2nd Strike Brigade 'Ljubo Šercer', and 13th Brigade 'Mirko Bračič', moved to Pohorje to create a second liberated area.

With 4th Operational Zone was a British Liaison Mission, led by Major Franklin A. Lindsay of the Office of Strategic Services (OSS). Codename: Cuckold, the mission was primarily an SOE mission, however, it was operated jointly with MI9, with Lindsay responsible for assisting Escapers and Evaders (E&Es). Lindsay's first contact with E&E's was a group of American airmen being escorted south by Partisans. They informed him their mission before they were shot down was to bomb the railway yard in Maribor. On June 21, 1944 two escaped POWs from Maribor - Private Owen Petersen and Driver Alfed Ashley - reached Pohorje where Lindsay and the 14th Division were encamped. Franklin likely learned from them that Working Camp 1046 GW was still residing in the Maribor railway yard, and was being targeted by Allied bombing raids. Lindsay radioed MI9 and informed them he planned to launch a rescue attempt. MI9 began searching for an officer to send to Cuckold as a dedicated MI9 agent. They selected Major Andrew Anthony Vincent Losco under the cover name 'Matthews'.

== Escape ==
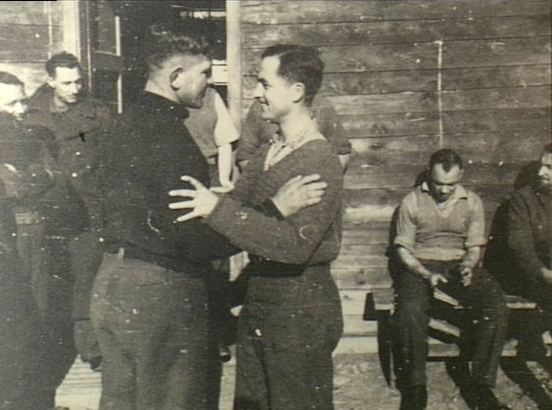
Ralph Churches (right foreground) at Work Camp 1046/GW after an earlier escape attempt

Churches and Laws searched in vain for a contact with the Partisans for several months. Around July 1944, Elisabeta Zavodnik - from whose cottage Laws drew water for the 1046/GW working crew while they were working opposite Ožbalt - introduced him to her cousin Anton. Anton was most likely sent by 4th Operational Zone to scout ahead, and he promised that in several weeks' time, a Partisan force would rescue the entire crew. Feeling unable to make the necessary preparations for a mass escape with just two men, Churches and Laws cut their bunk mates into the plan: Leonard Austin, Kenneth Carson, Andrew Hamilton, Robert McKenzie, Griffin Rendell, and Philip Tapping. Ralph then resigned as Man of Confidence to take up regular work on the railway crew.

On August 29, Anton returned to the worksite and told Leslie to stand by. While fetching water on August 30, Anton intercepted Laws and told him to rendezvous in the woods at a determined time later that afternoon. Word was passed to the other seven, and all but Phil Tapping were able to extract themselves from the worksite and make the rendezvous. The raid had been cancelled, and Anton escorted the seven POWs through Pohorje to Lovrenc na Pohorju (German: Sankt Lorenzen am Bachern), recently seized by the 'Ljubo Šercer' Brigade. There, Leslie and Ralph were introduced to 'Ljubo Šercer' Brigade deputy-commander Jože 'Silni' Boldan, the commander of the Brigade's 3rd Battalion commander Ivan Kovačič (not to be confused with Ivan 'Efenka' Kovačič), and two unnamed members of Cuckold mission.

It is unknown why the full rescue was called off. However Major Losco had been unable to deploy, and would not get through for another three days. Laws and Churches were told they would be evacuated south, and then home. That night a rally was held by the Partisans at Lovrenc, and Ralph Churches got very drunk. Without consulting his fellow prisoners (or, apparently, the two Cuckold men) Churches convinced Boldan and Kovačič to stage a rescue of the 1046/GW crew, and another nearby working camp of around a dozen Brits employed as farmers.

== Raid ==
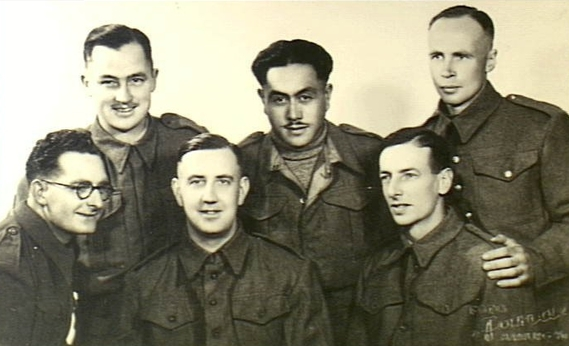
Back, left to right: Ralph Churches, Henare Turangi, and William G. Bunston. Front, left to right: 'Hank' Dale, Eric Lane, and Kenneth 'Kit' Carson.

Early the morning of August 31, Ralph and Leslie joined 3rd Battalion Ljubo Šercer Brigade and returned to the worksite. The Partisans laid in wait, and the train bearing the prisoners arrived as normal. When it had departed, the Partisans disarmed the eight guards and captured the four civilian overseers, and liberated the prisoners. In a short time the POWs, guards, and civilian overseers were being escorted south along a different route than that used by the first seven escapees the previous afternoon.

Altogether, around seventy more POWs from 1046/GW were freed. Partisans also raided the British farm at Ralph's suggestion, freeing nine more POWs. Although they arrived at the wrong camp first, freeing twenty Frenchmen - a mix of POWs and forced labourers - first. All three groups of POWs, along with their Partisan liberators, assembled at Rogla, in the hills of Pohorje. Including Churches and Laws and their original group of escapees, a total of 105 POWs were liberated by the Partisans during the escape and subsequent raids.

== Trek to Semič and aftermath ==
Following the gathering at Rogla, the escapees were guarded by provincial, semi-static units of the Slovenian Partisans. On September 2, they were handed to the Lackov (formerly Pohorje) Detachment. Twelve men led by Commissar Franc 'Švejk' Gruden were tasked to escort them to the Sava River. Progress north of the river was difficult, as German patrols were very active. An ambush the night of September 3 at Zavodne, led the column to scatter and six prisoners to go missing, including Kenneth Carson. By September 5 they had regrouped and reached the liberated area in the Savinja river valley. Here, they and their escort were given a half day's rest, and met Major Lindsay.

On September 7 the escapees were handed to the care of the Kamnik-Zasavje Detachment, responsible for ferrying people and supplies across the Sava river. After a successful crossing, the Dolenjska Detachment took over responsibility, and 250 kilometres (160 mi) and over 14 days after their escape, they reached Semič in White Carniola. The town housed Base 212, used by SOE and MI9 to barrack E&Es prior to evacuation by air. After a few days delay waiting for aircraft to be available and weather conditions to be suitable, they were flown from an airfield at Otok, to Bari in Italy on 21 September 1944. The last plane developed a fault and was delayed, during which time Kenneth Carson was able to rejoin the group, having been picked up by another group of Partisans.

The escapees were given a short leave in Italy, before heading their separate ways in early October. The Brits sailed to Liverpool, while the New Zealanders and Australians headed to Melbourne. Both Ralph Churches and Les Laws were decorated for their actions in escaping and assisting the Partisans in planning the raid. Laws was awarded the Distinguished Conduct Medal, and Churches, the British Empire Medal. Churches reached Australia in November 1944, where after three months leave he was posted to the staff of a prisoner of war camp in Murchison, Victoria as an interpreter. He was subsequently promoted to sergeant and was discharged in November 1945. Churches returned to the site of the raid in 1972 and 1977, and was accompanied by Laws on a further visit in 1985. During these visits Churches and Laws were reunited with several of the Partisans that had escorted them to Semič.

== Conflicting accounts of events ==
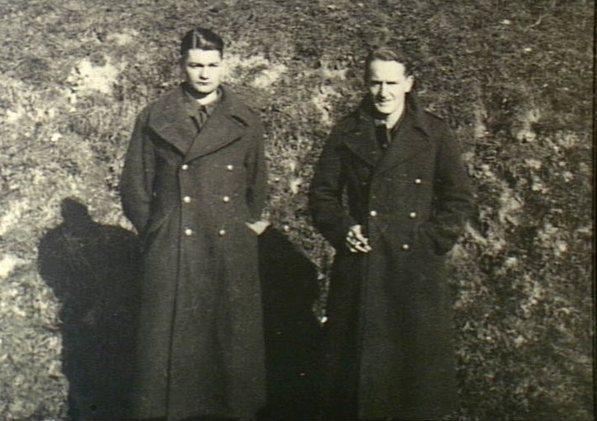
Les Laws (right) and another POW at the Maribor working camp before the escape and raid

There are two known primary sources regarding the details of the raid, and several secondary sources which drew largely on the accounts of Churches and/or Laws. There is one passing mention of the raid in the "Prisoner of War" volume of the Official History of New Zealand in the Second World War, which varies significantly from the other sources.

The first primary source is the book written by Churches, who was decorated for his involvement in the planning and conduct of the escape and raid. Churches' book, titled A Hundred Miles as the Crow Flies, was written after he was relieved of his obligation to secrecy by the Australian Army. The book details the events prior to the escape and the course of escape and evacuation. His book is also translated in Slovenian as Vranov let v svobodo (Crow's Flight into Freedom). Churches was known by the nickname "Crow" as he was the only soldier from the Australian state of South Australia in the camp, and South Australians are colloquially known in Australia as "crow eaters". Churches' version of events has been published, in part, by several secondary sources, including Australian television programs aired in 1985 and 2003, and newspaper articles in 1944, 2009 and 2011.

An Australian POW who was freed in the raid, Private Walter Gossner of the 2/15th Battalion, provided an extremely detailed account of his experiences about being part of a group of 87 POWs freed by Partisans from a location near Ožbalt. He gives the date of the raid as 27 September 1944, four weeks after the date given by Churches. His account has been posted on the internet by his family. Gossner states that he arrived at Semič 21 days after the raid, and his account varies significantly from that of Churches. It also claims Gossner served in the field for a short time as a Partisan. It is not known why Gossner's dates and other details of his account differ so markedly from Churches' account.

The Official History of New Zealand in the Second World War states that the raid occurred at St Lorenzen (the German name of Lovrenc na Pohorju), and that the raid was planned by two British officers. This varies significantly from all of the other sources, and it is unknown why this is the case.

Historiographical questions around the escape have largely been resolved following the gathering of new identified primary sources, comprehensive archival research, and the publication of The Greatest Escape by Ralph Churches' son Neil Churches, alongside historian Edmund Goldrick.
