= Yehiel De-Nur =

Jewish writer and Holocaust survivor (1909–2001)

- יחיאל די-נור
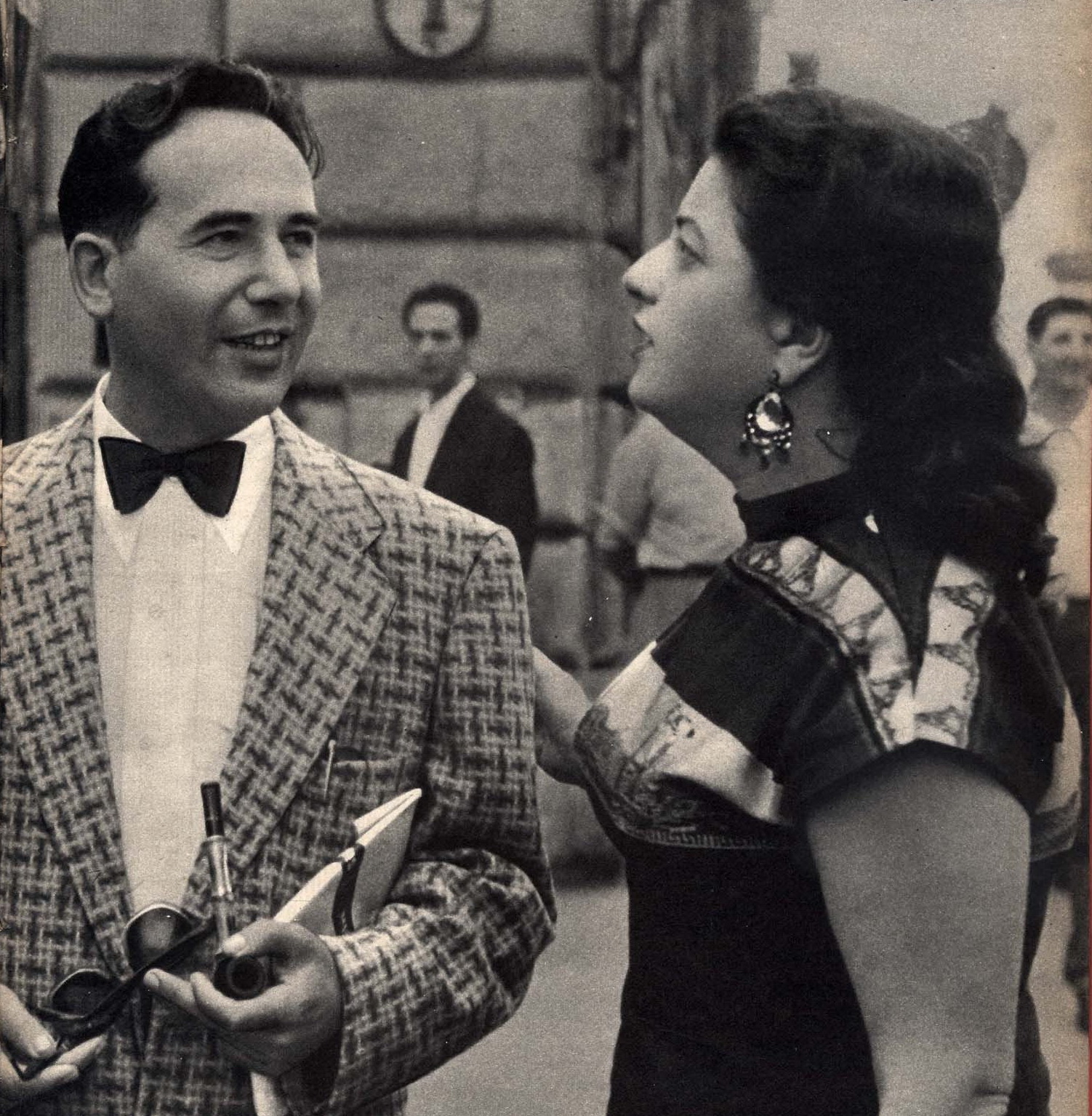
- De-Nur and his wife in Rome, 1959
- Born: Yehiel Feiner; 16 May 1909; Sosnowiec, Congress Poland
- Died: 17 July 2001 (aged 92); Tel Aviv, Israel
- Other name: Ka-Tzetnik 135633
- Occupation: Writer
- Spouse: Nina De-Nur
- Children: 2

Yehiel De-Nur testifies at the trial of Adolf Eichmann in 1961.

Yehiel De-Nur (Note: Hebrew: יחיאל די-נור; De-Nur means 'of the fire' in Aramaic; also romanized Dinoor, Di-Nur) (né Feiner; 16 May 1909 – 17 July 2001), also known as Ka-Tzetnik 135633, (Note: Hebrew: ק.צטניק; Ka-Tzetnik means prisoner or inmate and 135633 was De-Nur's concentration camp number; also romanized Ka-Tsetnik and K. Tzetnik) was a Jewish writer and Holocaust survivor whose books were inspired by his time as a prisoner in the Auschwitz concentration camp.

== Biography ==
Yehiel De-Nur was born in Sosnowiec, Poland. He was a pupil in Chachmei Lublin Yeshiva and later supported Zionism. In 1931, he published a book of Yiddish poetry, the extant copies of which he tried to destroy after the war.

During World War II, De-Nur spent two years as a prisoner in Auschwitz. In 1945, he immigrated to Mandatory Palestine (now Israel). He wrote several books and essays in Modern Hebrew about his experiences in the camp using his identity number at Auschwitz, Ka-Tzetnik 135633 (sometimes "K. Tzetnik").

The word Ka-Tzetnik (קאַצעטניק) is, in the Yiddish dialect that was spoken in the camps, a prisoner or inmate (derived from "ka tzet", the pronunciation of KZ, the acronym for Konzentrationslager); 135633 was De-Nur's concentration camp number. He also used the name Karl Zetinski (Karol Cetinsky, again the derivation from "KZ") as a refugee, hence the confusion over his real name when his works were first published.

De-Nur married Sara Sheindel Rotman (Sonia) in April 1940. After the war he married Nina De-Nur – the daughter of Prof. Joseph Asherman, a Tel Aviv gynecologist – who, as a young woman during the British governance of Palestine, had served in the British Army. Nina sought him out after reading his first novel Salamandra, and eventually they were married. She was instrumental in the translation and publication of many of his books. They had two children, a son (Lior) and a daughter (Daniella), named after the sister Daniella from House of Dolls, both still living in Israel. She trained with Virginia Satir in the 1970s. Later in life, Nina changed her name to Eli-Yah De-Nur.

In 1976, because of recurring nightmares and depression, De-Nur subjected himself to a form of psychedelic psychotherapy promoted by Dutch psychiatrist Jan Bastiaans expressly for concentration camp survivors. The treatment included the use of the hallucinogen LSD, and the visions experienced during this therapy became the basis for his book, Shivitti. The book's title is derived from David's Psalms 16:8, (Hebrew: שִׁוִּ֬יתִי יְהֹוָ֣ה לְנֶגְדִּ֣י, romanized: Shiwwiṯi YHVH lənegdi tāmiddy) "I am ever mindful of the LORD’s presence."

Yehiel De-Nur died in Tel Aviv on 17 July 2001.

== Testimony at Eichmann trial ==
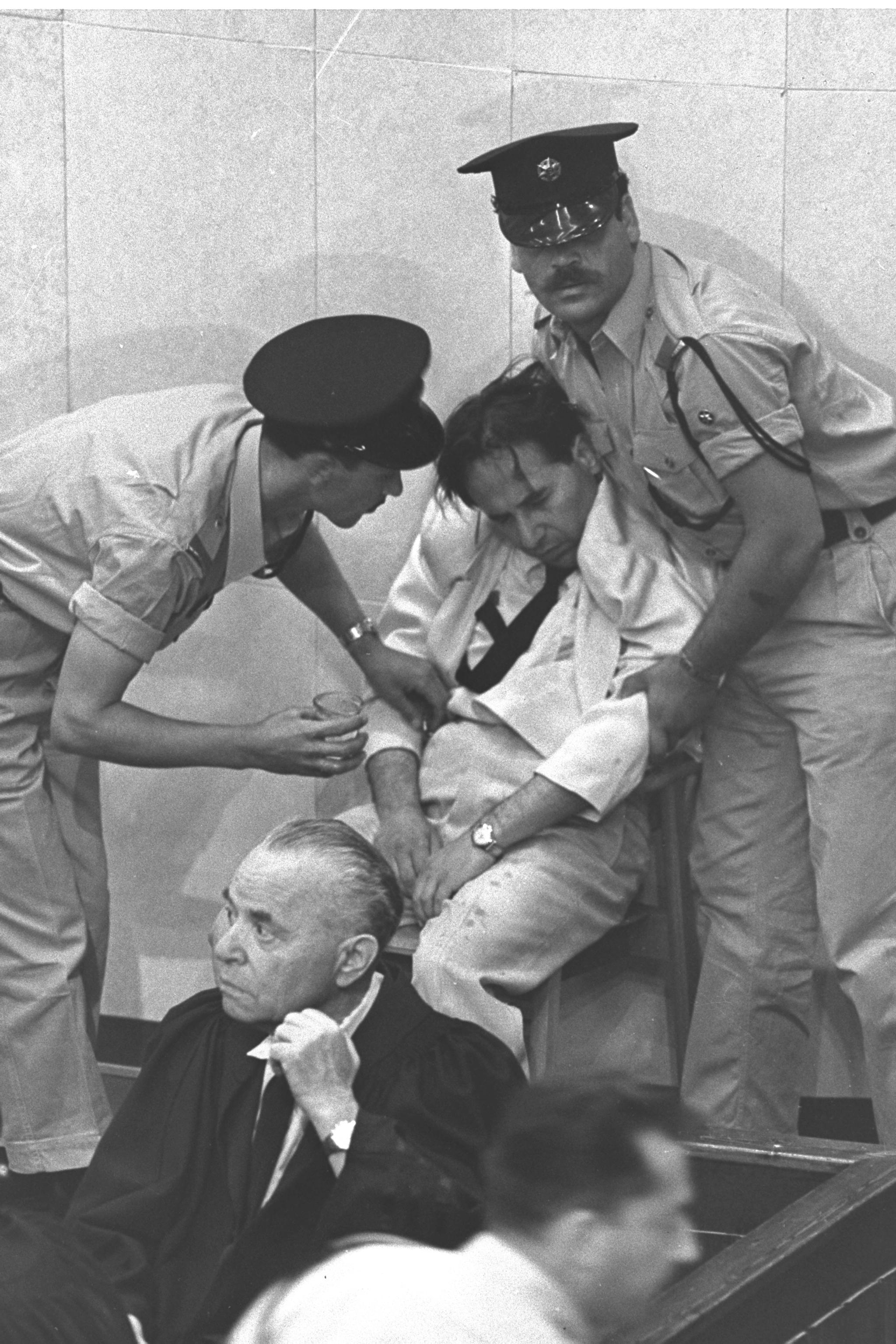
De-Nur collapsed after his testimony in the court

His civic identity was revealed when he testified at the Eichmann trial on 7 June 1961. In his opening statement, De-Nur described Auschwitz in unearthly metaphors, saying:

I do not see myself as a writer who writes literature. This is a chronicle from the planet Auschwitz. I was there for about two years. The time there is not the same as it is here, on Earth. (...) And the inhabitants of this planet had no names. They had no parents and no children. They did not wear [clothes] the way they wear here. They were not born there and did not give birth ... They did not live according to the laws of the world here and did not die. Their name was the number K. Tzetnik.

After saying this, De-Nur collapsed and gave no further testimony.

Tom Hurwitz, son of the TV producer showing the trial live at the time, was present during this testimony and recounts the collapse as a stroke.

In an interview on 60 Minutes broadcast on 6 February 1983, De-Nur recounted the incident of his fainting at the Eichmann trial to host Mike Wallace.

Was Dinur overcome by hatred? Fear? Horrid memories? No; it was none of these. Rather, as Dinur explained to Wallace, all at once he realized Eichmann was not the god-like army officer who had sent so many to their deaths. This Eichmann was an ordinary man. "I was afraid about myself," said Dinur. "... I saw that I am capable to do this. I am ... exactly like he."

In her report on the trial, Eichmann in Jerusalem, Hannah Arendt perhaps sarcastically implies that his fainting might have been because he was "deeply wounded" by the polite efforts of the prosecutor Gideon Hausner and presiding judge Moshe Landau to get him to speak in more concrete descriptive terms.

== Literary career ==
De-Nur wrote his first book about the Auschwitz experience, Salamandra, over two and a half weeks, while in a British army hospital in Italy in 1945. The original manuscript was in Yiddish, but it was first published in 1946 in Hebrew in edited form.

=== House of Dolls ===
His most famous work was 1955's House of Dolls, which portrayed the Freudenabteilung or "Joy Division" as a Nazi system keeping Jewish women as sex slaves in concentration camps. He suggests that the subject of the book was a younger sister who did not survive the Holocaust.

While De-Nur's books are still a part of the Israeli high-school curriculum, Na'ama Shik, a researcher at Yad Vashem, The Holocaust Martyrs' and Heroes' Remembrance Authority in Israel, has claimed that House of Dolls is a kind of pornographic fiction, not least because sexual relations with Jews were strictly forbidden to all Aryan citizens of Nazi Germany, so that in fact the women in the brothels were all non-Jewish prisoners. In De-Nur's 1961 book Piepel, about sexual abuse of young boys in the camps, he suggests the subject of this book was a younger brother who also died in a concentration camp.

House of Dolls is at times pointed to as the inspiration behind the Nazi exploitation genre of serialized cheap paperbacks, known in Israel as Stalag fiction (סטאלגים). Their publisher later acknowledged the Eichmann trial as the motive behind the series. The British post-punk band Joy Division derived its name from this book, which was quoted in their song "No Love Lost".

== Documentary ==
In 2023 the documentary The Return from the Other Planet about De-Nur directed by Assaf Lapid was produced. The title alludes to the term "planet Auschwitz" which he used during his testimony at Eichmann trial. Ofer Liebergall suggests that the title has a second meaning. After undergoing psychiatric treatment De-Nur changed his perception about Auschwitz: he came to the realization that it was not another world, but a man-made place. At a TV interview with journalist Ram Evron he said:

Then it was clear to me that Auschwitz is not another planet as I thought before. Auschwitz was not created by the devil, nor by God, but by man ... Hitler was not a devil. You could enter a kindergarten, among fifty children there was one child named Adolf Hitler. He was a man ...

The film won the Best Investigative Documentary Award at the 2023 Jerusalem Film Festival, the recipient of the Emerging Filmmaker Award at the 2024 Atlanta Jewish Film Festival, and was nominated for the Ophir Award in the Best Documentary Over 60 Minutes category in 2024.

== Published works ==
- Salamandra, 1946; as Sunrise over Hell, translated by Nina Dinur, 1977
- Beit habubot, 1953; as House of Dolls, translated by Moshe M. Kohn, 1955
- Hashaon asher meal harosh (The Clock Overhead), 1960
- Karu lo pipl (They called Him Piepel), 1961; as Piepel, translated by Moshe M. Kohn, 1961; as Atrocity, 1963; as Moni: A Novel of Auschwitz, 1963
- Kokhav haefer (Star of Ashes), 1966; as Star Eternal, translated by Nina Dinur, 1972
- Kahol miefer (Phoenix From Ashes), 1966; as Phoenix Over The Galilee, translated by Nina Dinur, 1969; as House of Love, 1971
- Nidon lahayim (Judgement of Life), 1974
- Haimut (The Confrontation), 1975
- Ahavah balehavot, 1976; as Love in the Flames, translated by Nina Dinur, 1971
- Hadimah (The Tear), 1978
- Daniella, 1980
- Nakam (Revenge), 1981
- Hibutei ahavah (Struggling with Love), 1984
- Shivitti: A Vision, translated by Eliyah Nike Dinur and Lisa Herman, 1989
- Kaddish, (Contains Star Eternal plus essays written in English or Yiddish), 1998
- Ka-Tzetnik 135633 (Yehiel De-Nur), House of Dolls (London: Grafton Books, 1985)
- Ka-Tzetnik 135633 (Yehiel De-Nur), House of Love (London: W.H. Allen, 1971)
- Ka-Tzetnik 135633 (Yehiel De-Nur), Moni: A Novel of Auschwitz (New Jersey: Citadel Press, 1963)
- Ka-Tzetnik 135633 (Yehiel De-Nur), Phoenix Over The Galilee (New York: Harper & Row, 1969)
- Ka-Tzetnik 135633 (Yehiel De-Nur), Shivitti: A Vision (California: Gateways, 1998)
- Ka-Tzetnik 135633 (Yehiel De-Nur), Star Eternal (New York: Arbor House, 1971)
- Ka-Tzetnik 135633 (Yehiel De-Nur), Sunrise Over Hell (London: W.H. Allen, 1977)
