= Forced prostitution =

Prostitution that takes place as a result of coercion by a third party

Forced prostitution, also known as involuntary prostitution or compulsory prostitution, is prostitution or sexual slavery that takes place as a result of coercion by a third party. The terms "forced prostitution" or "enforced prostitution" appear in international and humanitarian conventions, such as the Rome Statute of the International Criminal Court, but have been inconsistently applied. "Forced prostitution" refers to conditions of control over a person who is coerced by another to engage in sexual activity.

== Legal situation ==
Forced prostitution is illegal under customary law in all countries. This is different from voluntary prostitution which may have a different legal status in different countries, which range from being fully illegal and punishable by death to being legal and regulated as an occupation.

While the legality of adult prostitution varies between jurisdictions, the prostitution of children is illegal nearly everywhere in the world.

In 1949, the UN General Assembly adopted the Convention for the Suppression of the Traffic in Persons and of the Exploitation of the Prostitution of Others. This Convention supersedes a number of earlier conventions that covered some aspects of forced prostitution, and also deals with other aspects of prostitution. It penalizes the procurement and enticement to prostitution as well as the maintenance of brothels. As at December 2013, the convention has only been ratified by 82 countries. One of the main reasons it has not been ratified by many countries is because the legal term 'voluntary' is broadly defined in countries with a legal sex industry. For example, in countries such as Germany, the Netherlands, New Zealand, Greece and Turkey some forms of prostitution and pimping are legal and regulated as professional occupations.

The Thirteen Amendment abolished slavery in the United States of America. "We see forced prostitution and slavery intertwining because they are similar. When slavery was illegal, they were forced into hard labor, and we see women being forced to perform sexual activities for their 'masters' or 'pimps.'"

If a procurer forces anyone to engage in prostitution across state lines, they may be charged under both the Mann Act and the Travel Act.

== Child prostitution ==
Child prostitution is considered inherently non-consensual and exploitative, as children, because of their age, are not legally able to consent. In most countries child prostitution is illegal irrespective of the child reaching a lower statutory age of consent.

State parties to the Optional Protocol on the Sale of Children, Child Prostitution and Child Pornography are required to prohibit child prostitution. The Protocol defines a child as any human being under the age of 18, "unless an earlier age of majority is recognized by a country's law". The Protocol entered into force on 18 January 2002, and as of December 2013, 166 states are party to the Protocol and another 10 states have signed but not yet ratified it.

The Worst Forms of Child Labour Convention, 1999 (Convention No 104) of the International Labour Organization (ILO) provides that the use, procuring or offering of a child for prostitution is one of the worst forms of child labor. This convention, adopted in 1999, provides that countries that had ratified it must eliminate the practice urgently. It enjoys the fastest pace of ratifications in the ILO's history since 1919.

In the United States, the Victims of Trafficking and Violence Protection Act of 2000 classifies any "commercial sex act [which] is induced by force, fraud, or coercion, or in which the person induced to perform such act has not attained 18 years of age" to be a "Severe Form of Trafficking in Persons".

In poorer nations, child prostitution remains a serious issue; tourists from the Western world travel to these countries to engage in child sex tourism. Thailand, Cambodia, India, Brazil and Mexico have been identified as leading hotspots of child sexual exploitation.

== Human trafficking ==
Trafficking of women and children (and, more rarely, young men) for prostitution is a violation of human rights, but labor trafficking is probably more widespread.

Evidence can be found in field studies of trafficking victims across the world and in the simple fact that the worldwide market for labor is far greater than that for sex. Statistics on the "end use" of trafficked people are often unreliable because they tend to over-represent the sex trade.

Human trafficking, especially of girls and women, often leads to forced prostitution and sexual slavery. In some cases, a pimp may exploit a person who suffers from a mental illness to engage in prostitution. According to a 2007 report by the UNODC, internationally, the most common destinations for victims of human trafficking are Thailand, Japan, Israel, Belgium, the Netherlands, Germany, Italy, Turkey and the United States. The major sources of trafficked persons are Thailand, China, Nigeria, Albania, Bulgaria, Belarus, Moldova, and Ukraine. Victims of cybersex trafficking are transported and then coerced to perform sexual acts and or raped in front of a webcam on live streams that are often commercialized.

A 2010 United Nations Office on Drugs and Crime report estimates that globally, 79% of identified victims of human trafficking were trafficked for sexual exploitation, 18% for forced labor, and 3% for other forms of exploitation. In 2011, preliminary European Commission in September 2011 similarly estimated that among human-trafficking victims, 75% were trafficked for sexual exploitation and the rest for forced labor or other forms of exploitation.

Due to the illegal nature of prostitution and the different methodologies used in separating forced prostitution from voluntary prostitution, the extent of this phenomenon is difficult to estimate accurately. According to a 2008 report by the U.S. Department of State: "Annually, according to U.S. Government-sponsored research completed in 2006, 600,000 to 800,000 people are trafficked across national borders, which does not include millions trafficked within their own countries. Approximately 80% of transnational victims are women and girls and up to 50% are minors, and the majority of transnational victims are trafficked into commercial sexual exploitation." A 2014 European Commission report found that from 2010 to 2013, a total of 30,146 people were registered as victims of human trafficking in the 28 member states of the European Union; of these, 69% were victims of sexual exploitation.

In 2004, The Economist claimed that only a small proportion of prostitutes were explicitly trafficked against their will.

Elizabeth Pisani protested against the perceived hysteria around human trafficking preceding sport events such as the Super Bowl or FIFA World Cup.

The Protocol to Prevent, Suppress and Punish Trafficking in Persons, especially Women and Children (also referred to as the Palermo Protocol) is a protocol to the United Nations Convention against Transnational Organized Crime and defines human trafficking as the "recruitment, transportation, transfer, harbouring or receipt of persons, by means of the threat or use of force or other forms of coercion, of abduction, of fraud, of deception, of the abuse of power or of a position of vulnerability or of the giving or receiving of payments or benefits to achieve the consent of a person having control over another person, for the purpose of exploitation." For this reason, threat, coercion, or use of force is not necessary to constitute trafficking, the exploitation of an existing vulnerability – such as economic vulnerability or sexual vulnerability – is sufficient. Sigma Huda, UN special reporter on trafficking in persons, observed that "For the most part, prostitution as actually practiced in the world usually does satisfy the elements of trafficking." However Save the Children see explicit trafficking and prostitution as different issues: "The issue [human trafficking] however, gets mired in controversy and confusion when prostitution too is considered as a violation of the basic human rights of both adult women and minors, and equal to sexual exploitation per se. From this standpoint then, trafficking and prostitution become conflated with each other".

== Attitudes towards whether prostitution can ever be voluntary ==
With regard to prostitution, three worldviews exist: abolitionism (where the prostitute is considered a victim), regulation (where the prostitute is considered a worker) and prohibitionism (where the prostitute is considered a criminal). Each these views are represented in some Western country.

For the proponents of the abolitionist view, prostitution is always a coercive practice, and the prostitute is seen as a victim. They argue that most prostitutes are forced into the practice, either directly, by pimps and traffickers, indirectly through poverty, drug addiction and other personal problems, or, as it has been argued in recent decades by radical feminists such as Andrea Dworkin, Melissa Farley and Catharine MacKinnon, merely by patriarchal social structures and power relations between men and women. William D. Angel finds that "most" prostitutes have been forced into the occupation through poverty, lack of education and lack of employment possibilities. Kathleen Barry argues that, "there should be no distinction between 'free' and 'coerced', 'voluntary' and 'involuntary' prostitution, since any form of prostitution is a human rights violation, an affront to womanhood that cannot be considered dignified labour". France's Green Party argues: "The concept of 'free choice' of the prostitute is indeed relative, in a society where gender inequality is institutionalized." The proponents of the abolitionist view hold that prostitution is a practice which ultimately leads to the mental, emotional and physical destruction of the women who engage in it, and, as such, it should be abolished. As a result of such views on prostitution, Sweden, Norway and Iceland have enacted laws which criminalize the clients of the prostitutes, but not the prostitutes themselves.

In contrast to the abolitionist view, those who favour legalization do not consider the women who practice prostitution as victims, but as independent adult women who have made a choice which should be respected. Mariska Majoor, former prostitute and founder of the Prostitution Information Center, from Amsterdam, holds that: "In our [sex workers'] eyes it's a profession, a way of making money; it's important that we are realistic about this ... Prostitution is not bad; it's only bad if done against one's will. Most women make this decision themselves." According to proponents of regulation, prostitution should be considered a legitimate activity, which must be recognized and regulated, in order to protect the workers' rights and to prevent abuse. The prostitutes are treated as sex workers who enjoy benefits similar to other occupations. The World Charter for Prostitutes Rights (1985), drafted by the International Committee for Prostitutes' Rights, calls for the decriminalisation of "all aspects of adult prostitution resulting from individual decision". Since the mid-1970s, sex workers across the world have organised, demanding the decriminalisation of prostitution, equal protection under the law, improved working conditions, the right to pay taxes, travel and receive social benefits such as pensions. As a result of such views on prostitution, countries such as Germany, the Netherlands and New Zealand have fully legalized prostitution. Prostitution is considered a job like any other.

In its understanding of the distinction between sex work and forced prostitution, the Open Society Foundations organization states: "sex work is done by consenting adults, where the act of selling or buying sexual services is not a violation of human rights".

== Legal discrimination ==
Sexual discrimination happens to those who work both in sex work and forced prostitution. Historically, crimes involving violence against women and having to do with prostitution and sex work have been taken less seriously by the law. Although acts such as the Violence Against Women Act have been passed to take steps toward preventing such violence, there is still sexism rooted in the way that the legal system approaches these cases. Gender based violence is a serious form of discrimination that has slipped through many cracks in the legal system of the United States. These efforts have fallen short due to the fact that there is no constitutional protection for women against discrimination.

There is often no evidence, according to police, that when men are arrested for soliciting a prostitute that it is a gender based crime. However, there are large discrepancies between the arrests of prostitutes and the arrests of men caught in the act. While 70% of prostitution related arrests are of woman prostitutes, only 10% of related arrests are men/customers. Regardless if the girl or woman is either underage or forced into the exchange, she is still often arrested and victim blamed instead of being offered resources. The men who are charged with engaging in these illegal acts with woman who are prostitutes are able to pay for the exchange and therefore are usually able to pay for their release while the woman may not be able to. This generates a cycle of violence against women, as the situation's outcome favors the man. In one case, a nineteen-year-old woman in Oklahoma was charged with offering to engage in prostitution when the woman was known to have previously been a victim of human sex trafficking. She is an example of how the criminalization of prostitution often leads to women being arrested multiple times due to the fact that they are often punished or arrested even when the victim of a situation. Young women and girls have a much higher likelihood of getting arrested for prostitution than boys in general, and woman victims of human trafficking often end up being arrested upon multiple occasions, being registered as a sex offender, and being institutionalized. The lack of rehabilitation given to women after experiences with human sex trafficking contributes to the cycles of arrests that most woman who engage in prostitution face.

== Global situation ==
It is estimated that two thirds of women trafficked for prostitution worldwide annually come from Eastern Europe and China, three-quarters of whom have never worked as prostitutes before. The major destinations are Belgium, the Netherlands, Germany, Italy, Turkey, the Middle East (Israel, the United Arab Emirates), Asia, Russia and the United States.

=== Europe ===
In Europe, since the fall of the Iron Curtain in 1991, the former Eastern bloc countries such as Albania, Moldova, Bulgaria, Russia, Belarus and Ukraine have been identified as the major source countries for trafficking of women and children. Young women and girls are often lured to wealthier countries by the promises of money and work and then forced into sexual slavery.

=== Americas ===
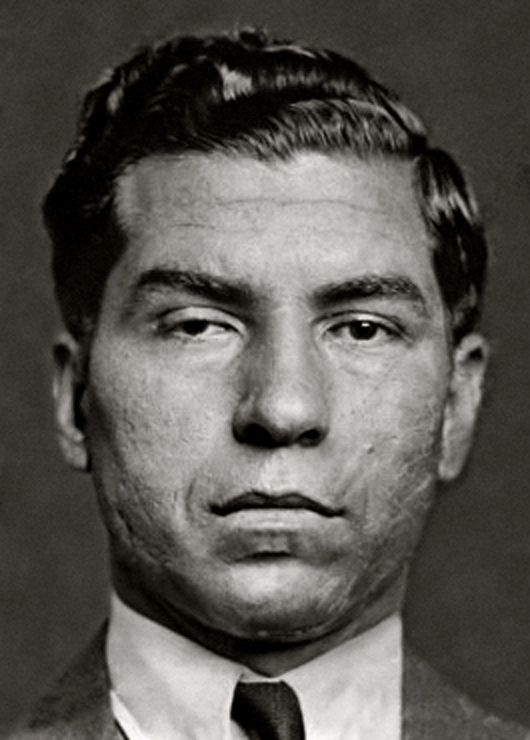
Mobster Charles "Lucky" Luciano was convicted of compulsory prostitution and running a prostitution racket in the US in 1936.

In Mexico, many criminal organisations lure and capture women and use them in brothels. Women who become useless to the organisations, are often killed. Criminal organisations frequently focus on poor, unemployed girls, and lure them via job offerings (regular jobs), done via billboards and posters, placed on the streets. In cities such as Ciudad Juárez, there is a high degree of corruption in all levels on the social ladder (police, courts, ...) which makes it more difficult to combat this criminal activity. Hotels where women are kept and which are known by the police are often also not raided/closed down by police. Nor are the job offerings actively investigated. Some NGO's such as Nuestras Hijas de Regreso a Casa A.C. are trying to fight back, often without much success.

In 2002, the US Department of State repeated an earlier CIA estimate that each year, about 50,000 women and children are brought against their will to the United States for sexual exploitation. Former Secretary of State Colin Powell said that "[h]ere and abroad, the victims of trafficking toil under inhuman conditions – in brothels, sweatshops, fields and even in private homes." In addition to internationally trafficked victims, American citizens are also forced into prostitution. According to the National Center for Missing and Exploited Children, "100,000 to 293,000 children are in danger of becoming sexual commodities."

==== In prison ====
Transgender women in male prisons are at risk of being forced into prostitution by both prison staff and other prisoners. Forced prostitution can occur when a correction officer brings a transgender woman to the cell of a male inmate and locks them in so that the male inmate can rape her. The male inmate will then pay the correction officer in some way and sometimes the correction officer will give the woman a portion of the payment. Prisoners serving as customers for these women are informally referred to as "husbands". Trans women who physically resist the customer's advances are often criminally charged with assault and placed in solitary confinement, the assault charge then being used to extend the woman's prison stay and deny her parole. This practice, known as "V-coding", has been described as so common that it is effectively "a central part of a trans woman's sentence".

=== Middle East ===
Eastern European women are trafficked to several Middle Eastern countries, including Turkey and the United Arab Emirates. Until 2004, Israel was a destination for human trafficking for the sex industry.

A high number of the Iraqi women fleeing the Iraq War turned to prostitution, while others were trafficked abroad, to countries like Syria, Jordan, Egypt, Qatar, the United Arab Emirates, Turkey, and Iran. In Syria alone, an estimated 50,000 Iraqi refugee girls and women, many of them widows, had become prostitutes. Cheap Iraqi prostitutes helped to make Syria a popular destination for sex tourists before the Syrian Civil War. The clients come from wealthier countries in the Middle East. High prices are offered for virgins.

=== Asia ===
In Asia, Japan is the major destination country for trafficked women, especially from the Philippines and Thailand. The US State Department has rated Japan as either a 'Tier 2' or a 'Tier 2 Watchlist' country every year since 2001, in its annual Trafficking in Persons reports. Both these ratings implied that Japan was (to a greater or lesser extent) not fully compliant with minimum standards for the elimination of human trafficking trade. As of 2009, an estimated 200,000 to 400,000 people are trafficked through Southeast Asia, much of it for prostitution. It is common that Thai women are lured to Japan and sold to Yakuza-controlled brothels where they are forced to work off their price. In Cambodia at least a quarter of the 20,000 people working as prostitutes are children with some being as young as 5. By the late 1990s, UNICEF estimated that there are 60,000 child prostitutes in the Philippines, describing Angeles City brothels as "notorious" for offering sex with children.

In Southern India & eastern Indian state of Odisha, devadasi is the practice of hierodulic prostitution, with similar customary forms such as basavi, and involves dedicating pre-pubescent and young adolescent girls from villages in a ritual marriage to a deity or a temple, who then work in the temple and function as spiritual guides, dancers, and prostitutes servicing male devotees in the temple. Human Rights Watch reports claim that devadasis are forced into this service and, at least in some cases, to practice prostitution for upper-caste members. Various state governments in India enacted laws to ban this practice both prior to India's independence and more recently. They include Bombay Devdasi Act, 1934, Devdasi (Prevention of dedication) Madras Act, 1947, Karnataka Devdasi (Prohibition of dedication) Act, 1982, and Andhra Pradesh Devdasi (Prohibition of dedication) Act, 1988. However, the tradition continues in certain regions of India, particularly the states of Karnataka and Andhra Pradesh.

== History ==
Forced prostitution has existed throughout history. It is said to be the oldest form of slavery.

=== Slavery and prostitution – the example of Phaedo of Elis ===
Phaedo of Elis was a native of the ancient Greek city state of Elis and of high birth. He was taken prisoner in his youth, and passed into the hands of an Athenian slave dealer; being of considerable personal beauty, he was forced into male prostitution. Luckily for him, Phaedo made an acquaintance with Socrates, to whom he attached himself. According to Diogenes Laërtius he was ransomed by one of the friends of Socrates. He prominently appears in Plato's dialogue Phaedo which takes its name from him, and later became a major philosopher in his own right.

The case of Phaedo got special attention due to these exceptional circumstances. Countless other slaves, male and female, were less lucky and lived out their lives in perpetual prostitution. The institution of slavery left a master with no need to ask a slave's consent for sex. Masters could and often did force their slaves into sex, but also had the option of forcing the slave into lucrative prostitution. Not only did the slaves have no choice about it, but they did not benefit from the payment clients made for their sexual services – it went into the master's pocket.

=== Middle East ===
In the Islamic world, sex outside of marriage was normally acquired by men not by paying for temporary sex from a free sex worker, but rather by personal sex slave called concubine, which was a sex slave trade that was still ongoing in the early 20th-century.

Traditionally, prostitution in the Islamic world was historically practiced by way of the pimp temporarily selling his slave to her client, who then returned the ownership of the slave after intercourse. The Islamic Law formally prohibited prostitution. However, since Islamic Law allowed a man to have sexual intercourse with his personal sex slave, prostitution was practiced by a pimp selling his female slave on the slave market to a client, who returned his ownership of her after 1–2 days on the pretext of discontent after having had intercourse with her, which was a legal and accepted method for prostitution in the Islamic world. This form of prostitution was practiced by for example Ibn Batuta, who acquired several female slaves during his travels.

=== War of Canudos in Brazil ===
The War of Canudos (1895–1898) was an unequal conflict between the state of Brazil and some 30,000 inhabitants of a rebel community named Canudos in the northeastern state of Bahia. It marks the deadliest civil war in Brazilian history, ending with mass atrocities. After a number of unsuccessful attempts at military suppression, it came to a brutal end in October 1897, when a large Brazilian army force overran the village and killed nearly all the inhabitants. Men were hacked to pieces in front of their wives and children. In the aftermath, some of the surviving women were taken captive and sent to brothels in Salvador.

=== Nazi Germany ===
German military brothels were set up by the Third Reich during World War II throughout much of occupied Europe for the use of Wehrmacht and SS soldiers. These brothels were generally new creations, but in the West, they were sometimes set up using existing brothels as well as many other buildings. Until 1942, there were around 500 military brothels of this kind in German-occupied Europe. Often operating in confiscated hotels and guarded by the Wehrmacht, these facilities used to serve travelling soldiers and those withdrawn from the front. According to records, at least 34,140 European women were forced to serve as prostitutes during the German occupation of their own countries along with female prisoners of concentration camp brothels. In many cases in Eastern Europe, the women involved were kidnapped on the streets of occupied cities during German military and police round ups called łapanka or rafle.

In World War II, Nazi Germany established brothels in the concentration camps (Lagerbordell) to create an incentive for prisoners to collaborate, although these institutions were used mostly by Kapos, "prisoner functionaries" and the criminal element, because regular inmates, penniless and emaciated, were usually too debilitated and wary of exposure to Schutzstaffel (SS) schemes. In the end, the camp brothels did not produce any noticeable increase in the prisoners' work productivity levels, but instead, created a market for coupons among the camp VIPs. The women forced into these brothels came mainly from the Ravensbrück concentration camp, except for Auschwitz, which employed its own prisoners. In combination with the German military brothels in World War II, it is estimated that at least 34,140 female inmates were forced into sexual slavery during the Third Reich. There were cases of Jewish women forced into such prostitution - even though German soldiers having sex with them thereby violated the Nazis' own Nuremberg Laws.

=== Comfort women ===
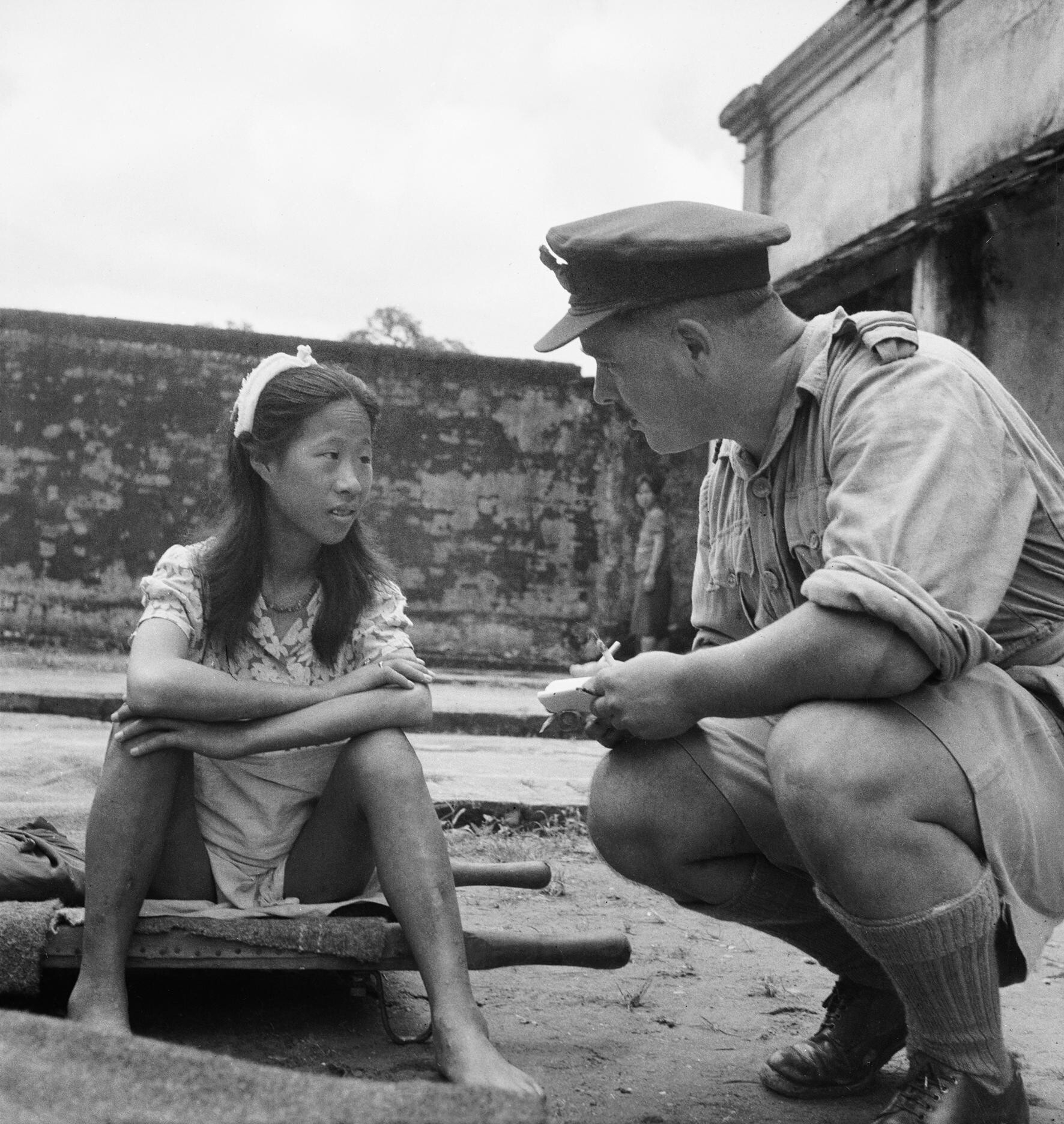
Rangoon, Burma. 8 August 1945. A young ethnic Chinese woman from one of the Imperial Japanese Army's "comfort battalions" is interviewed by an Allied officer.

Comfort women is a euphemism for women working in military brothels, especially by the Japanese military during World War II.

Around 200,000 are typically estimated to have been involved, with estimates as low as 20,000 from some Japanese scholars and estimates of up to 410,000 from some Chinese scholars, but the number is still being researched and debated. Historians and researchers have stated that the majority were from Korea, China, Japan and Philippines but women from Thailand, Vietnam, Malaysia, Taiwan, Indonesia, East Timor and other Japanese-occupied territories were also used in "comfort stations". Stations were located in Japan, China, the Philippines, Indonesia, then Malaya, Thailand, then Burma, then New Guinea, Hong Kong, Macau, and what was then French Indochina.

Young women from countries under Japanese Imperial control were reportedly abducted from their homes. In some cases, women were also recruited with offers to work in the military. It has been documented that the Japanese military itself recruited women by force. However, Japanese historian Ikuhiko Hata stated that there was no organized forced recruitment of comfort women by the Japanese government or military.

The number and nature of comfort women servicing the Japanese military during World War II is still being actively debated, and the matter is still highly political in both Japan and the rest of the Far East Asia.

Many military brothels were run by private agents and supervised by the Korean Police. Some Japanese historians, using the testimony of ex-comfort women, have argued that the Imperial Japanese Army and Navy were either directly or indirectly involved in coercing, deceiving, luring, and sometimes kidnapping young women throughout Japan's Asian colonies and occupied territories.

== International legislation ==
- ILO Forced Labour Convention, 1930 (No. 29)
- ILO Abolition of Forced Labour Convention, 1957 (No. 105)
- ILO Minimum Age Convention, 1973 (No. 138)
- ILO Worst Forms of Child Labour Convention, 1999 (No. 182)

== See also ==
- Comfort women
- Debt bondage
- Forced labour
- Human trafficking
- Trafficking of children
- International Day to End Violence Against Sex Workers
- Legality of prostitution
- Exploitation
- Prostitution
- Prostitution (criminology)
- Rochdale sex trafficking gang
- Wartime sexual violence
