= German military brothels in World War II =

Brothels for members of the Wehrmacht and the SS

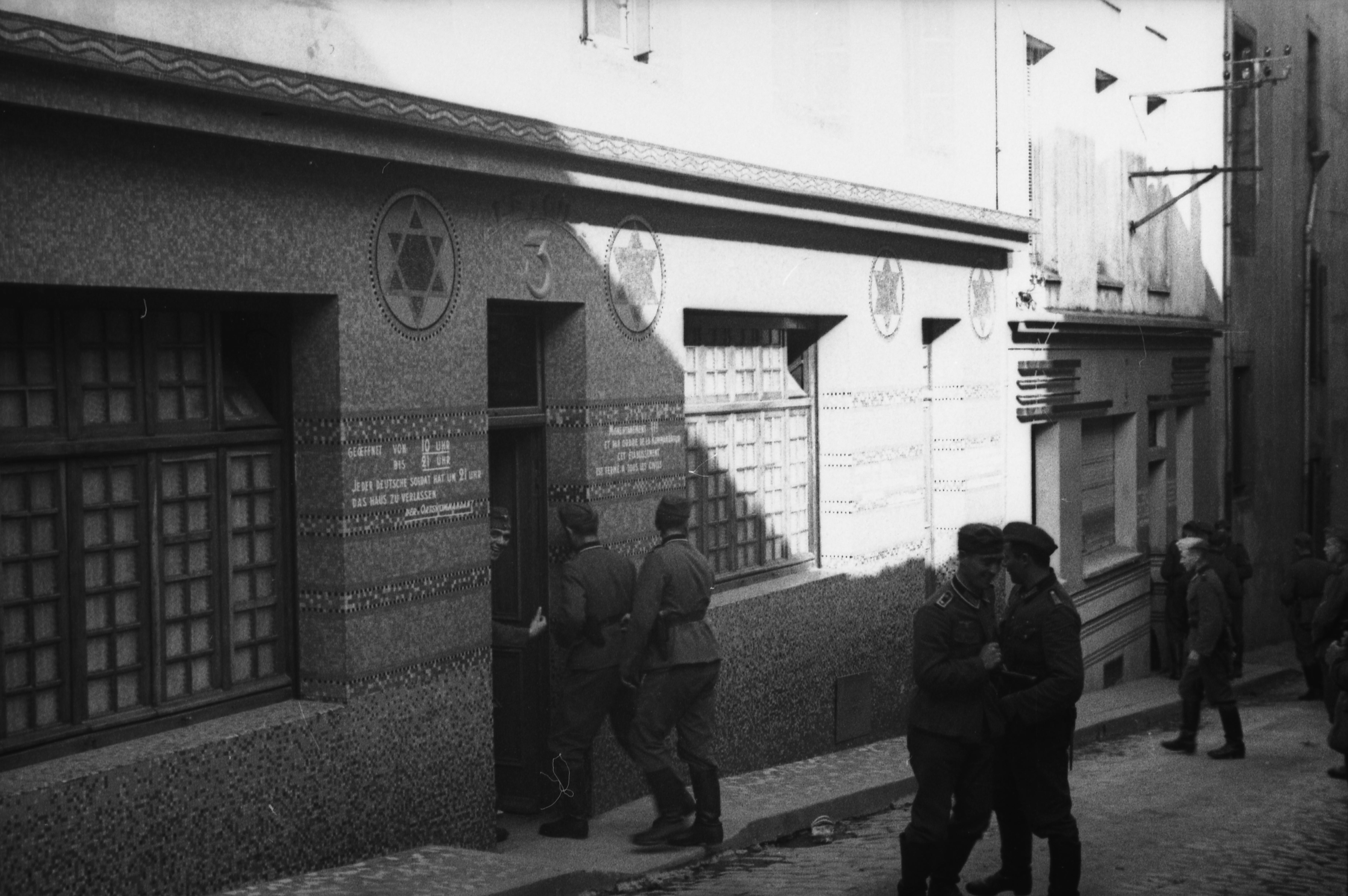
German soldiers entering a Soldatenbordell in Brest, France (1940). The building is a former synagogue.

Military brothels (German: Militärbordelle) were set up by Nazi Germany during World War II throughout much of occupied Europe for the use of Wehrmacht and SS soldiers. These brothels were generally new creations, but in the west, they were sometimes expansions of pre-existing brothels and other buildings. By 1942, there were around 500 military brothels of this kind in German-occupied Europe, serving travelling soldiers and those withdrawn from the front. According to records, a minimum of 34,140 European women were forced to serve as prostitutes during the German occupation of their own countries along with female prisoners of concentration camp brothels. In many cases in Eastern Europe, teenage girls and women were kidnapped on the streets of occupied cities during German military and police round ups called łapanka in Polish or rafle in French.

== Eastern Europe ==
The Foreign Ministry of the Polish government-in-exile issued a document on May 3, 1941, describing the mass kidnapping raids conducted in Polish cities with the aim of capturing young women, as young as 15, for sexual slavery at brothels run by the German military. On top of that, Polish girls as young as 15 – classified as suitable for slave labor and shipped to Germany – were sexually exploited by German men. In Brandenburg, two Polish Ostarbeiter teens who returned home to Kraków in advanced stage of pregnancy, reported to have been raped by German soldiers with such frequency that they were unable to perform any of the worker's designated labour.

The Swiss Red Cross mission driver Franz Mawick wrote in 1942 from Warsaw about what he saw: "Uniformed Germans ... gaze fixedly at women and girls between the ages of 15 and 25. One of the soldiers pulls out a pocket flashlight and shines it on one of the women, straight into her eyes. The two women turn their pale faces to us, expressing weariness and resignation. The first one is about 30 years old. 'What is this old whore looking for around here?' – one of the three soldiers laughs. 'Bread, sir' – asks the woman. ... 'A kick in the ass you get, not bread' – answers the soldier. Owner of the flashlight directs the light again on the faces and bodies of girls. ... The youngest is maybe 15 years old ... They open her coat and start groping her with their lustfull paws. 'This one is ideal for bed' – he says."

Conditions in brothels were brutal. The women were often raped by up to 32 men per day; the visiting soldiers were allocated 15 minutes each at a nominal cost of 3 Reichsmarks per "session" between the hours of 2 p.m. and 8.30 p.m. Approximately 35,000 women and girls were forced to work in brothels, with each woman being made to service seven or more men per day. Those who were visibly pregnant were sometimes released, but would not go back to their families, so as not to shame them.

In the Soviet Union, women were kidnapped by German forces for prostitution as well; one report by International Military Tribunal writes: "in the city of Smolensk the German Command opened a brothel for officers in one of the hotels into which hundreds of women and girls were driven; they were mercilessly dragged down the street by their arms and hair."

Yugoslavian women were reportedly placed into brothels, and a 1941 document from the Osijek archives discussing plans for multiple brothels in Osijek, as well as the required sanitation procedures, has also been found.

=== Causes ===
Although it contradicted the ideals of Aryan "moral strength and purity", the brothels were justified as acceptable sexual outlets for Nazi soldiers. Nazi beliefs incorporated a strict racial hierarchy with a deep fear of racial mixing, which played a major role in shaping prostitution politics. These were influenced by not only their racial views but also through political, social, and military objectives. That being said, the Nazis believed that military brothels were a better alternative than having sexual relations with local foreign women and forced laborers. They also believed that interacting with prostitutes was no different than interacting with naked female prisoners in Nazi camps.

=== Escape attempts ===
According to an exposé by the Polish Wprost magazine, the women forced into sexual slavery by the Nazi German authorities sometimes tried to escape. In one such instance, a group of Polish and Soviet women imprisoned at a German military brothel located in Norway escaped in 1941. They found refuge in the local Lutheran Church which offered them asylum.

== Occupied France ==
The Wehrmacht was able to establish a thoroughly bureaucratic system of around 100 new brothels already before 1942, based on an existing system of government-controlled ones – wrote Inse Meinen. The soldiers were given official visitation cards issued by Oberkommando des Heeres and were prohibited from engaging in sexual contact with other French women. In September 1941, Field Marshal Walther von Brauchitsch suggested that weekly visits for all younger soldiers be considered mandatory to prevent "sexual excesses" among them. The prostitutes had a scheduled medical check-up to slow the spread of sexually transmitted diseases.

== Forced prostitution ==
The Germans had to enforce stricter regulations to make sure soldiers had access to a sex life. A 1977 German report by a revisionist historian from Baden-Württemberg, Franz W. Seidler, contended that the foreign women who were made to register for the German military brothels had been prostitutes already before the war. Ruth Seifert, professor of sociology at the University of Applied Sciences in Regensburg, on the other hand, maintained that women were forced to work in these brothels by their German captors, as shown during the Trial of the Major War Criminals before the International Military Tribunal in Nuremberg in 1946, further confirmed by the 1961 book published by Raul Hilberg.

There were some prostitutes primarily in Western Europe who elected to work in the brothels, rather than to be sent to a concentration camp.

== See also ==
- Sexual slavery
- Wartime sexual violence
- Forced prostitution
- Roundup (history) (Łapanka)
- Comfort women (Japan) and Wianbu (South Korea)
- German war crimes
- House of Dolls novella about the Joy Division (WWII)
- Nazi war crimes in occupied Poland during World War II
- German mistreatment of Soviet prisoners of war
- Recreation and Amusement Association (Japan)
- Sexual slavery by Germany during World War II
- War rape by German forces during World War II
- Rape during the occupation of Germany
- Allied war crimes
