= Stalag XVIII-D =

WW2-era detainment camp for soldiers captured by the German Army

Stalag XVIII D (306)
- Maribor, Slovenia

Site information
- Type: Prisoner-of-war camp
- Controlled by: Nazi Germany

Location
- Coordinates: 46.5625°N 15.6662°E

Site history
- In use: 1941–1945
- Battles/wars: World War II

Garrison information
- Occupants: Captured prisoners of war from the Western Allies and Soviet Union

Stalag XVIII D (306) (Kriegsgefangenen-Mannschafts-Stammlager or Stammlager; abbreviated Stalag) was a Nazi prisoner-of-war camp complex for the detainment of captured Western Allied and Soviet soldiers, officers, and non-commissioned officers by the German Wehrmacht. It was established on 1 June 1941, in what was then Yugoslavia (later the Republic of Slovenia), which was under German occupation at the time. Stalag XVIII D took up buildings that had previously been used for army barracks and customs warehouses for grain, in Melje, a quarter of the city of Maribor, which in German was known as Marburg an der Drau. Stalag XVIII D formally operated until the beginning of October 1942. Initially, it was established for the captivity of captured Western Allied soldiers, mainly French, British, Greeks, Australians, New Zealanders and Yugoslavs. They were under the Geneva Convention on the Treatment of Prisoners of War (1929) and thus registered as prisoners of war by the Red Cross. After Operation Barbarossa, the existing camp complex was enlarged by establishing a completely separated and isolated "Russenlager" (Russian Camp or Russian section of the Stalag XVIII D) with facilities to detain solely captured Red Army soldiers. They were excluded from the Geneva Convention because the Soviet Union was not a signatory state. As a result, they have intentionally received the worst treatment and death through the destructive role of the camp. Russian Camp formally operated until late autumn 1942.

Between 1 August and 15 November 1942, a branch camp (Zweiglager) of the main Stalag XVIII B (Špital ob Dravi), called Stalag XVIII B/Z, operated in Maribor as well.

== Numerical overview and deaths ==
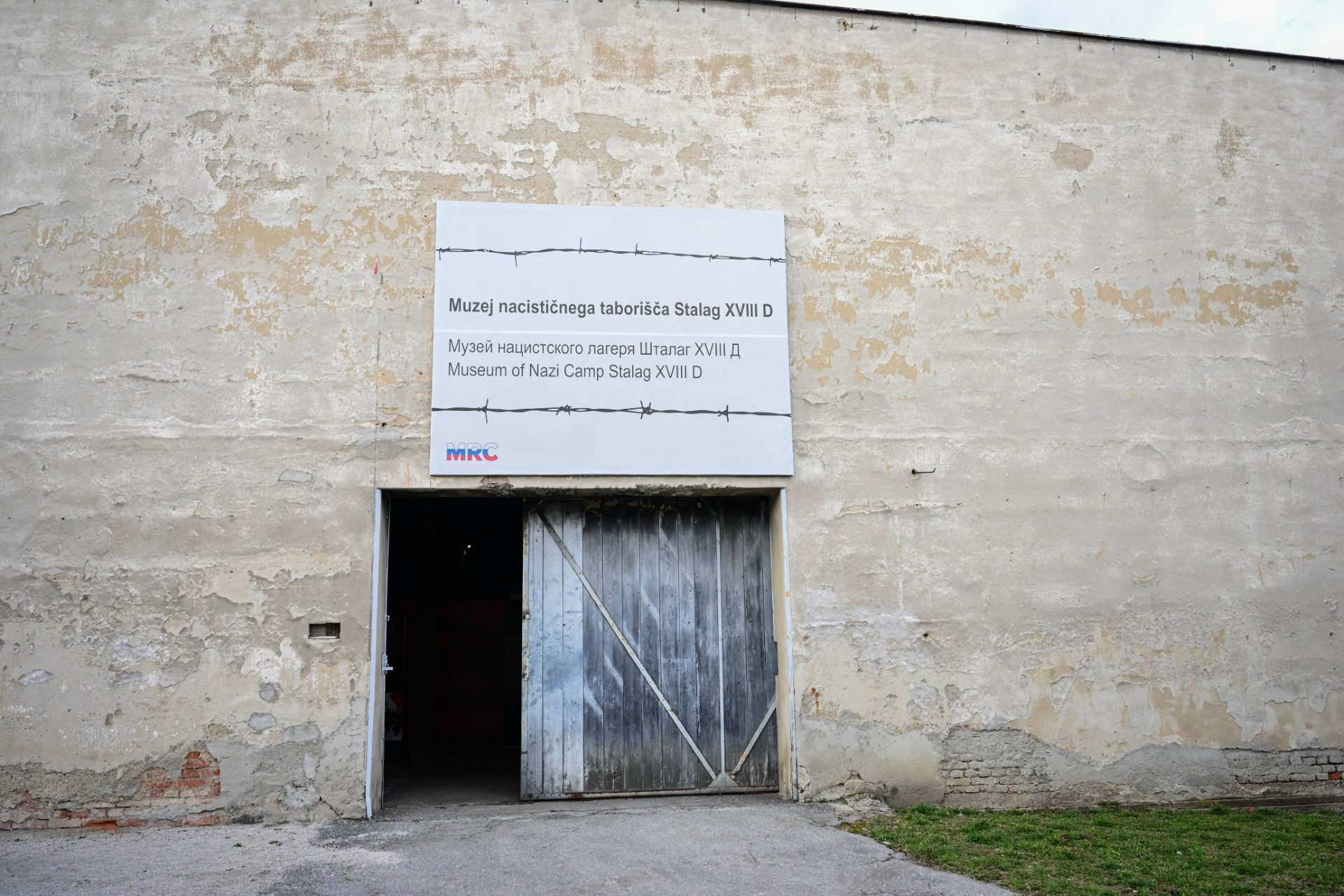
The main entrance into the building of an old customs grain warehouse of the Kingdom of Yugoslavia, where the Russian complex ("Russenlager") operated during the war as part of a Nazi destructive prisoner-of-war camp Stalag XVIII D. Nowadays, the International Research Centre for Second World War (IRC Maribor) and Museum of Stalag XVIII D operates in the same building.

The maximum capacity of the entire camp complex was 15,000 prisoners of war, which was even exceeded until January 1942. According to Slovenian researcher and historian Daniel Siter, there were around 1,400 captured Soviet soldiers detained in the camp until the beginning of December 1941 (the first available numerical data for Soviet POWs), with a maximum number until January 1942 (more than 5,000 Soviet POWs).

Until the arrival of the captured Red Army soldiers (after Operation Barbarossa), two-thirds of the camp prisoners were French, and one-third were English and Yugoslavs. The Yugoslav captives were quickly transferred to other prisoner-of-war camps, most often to Stalag XVIII C (317) in Markt Pongau, due to the intense partisan activity and the initial ban on the use of labour in the 18th Military District. In August and September 1941, they were replaced by French prisoners from the nearby Arbeitskommando (labour divisions). The first Soviet POWs arrived at the camp in the mid of September 1941. By April 1942, many Soviet captives had died in the Russian Camp, mainly due to the typhus epidemic, intentional malnutrition, and psychophysical exhaustion. The latter is evident from the difference in the figures for February–April 1942, when the number of Soviet prisoners fell by 4301 men, and by the almost unchanged ratio over the analysed period in terms of the number of prisoners used as a labour force. By July 1941, Stalag XVIII D contained nearly 4,500 British and Commonwealth prisoners captured in Greece and Crete. Conditions initially were deplorable, with more than 1,000 men accommodated in tents while additional huts were being constructed. However, the situation improved as the war went on.

The highest death rate was delivered among the captured Red Army soldiers between autumn 1941 and spring 1942, with few thousand killed Soviet POWs. Sources confirm up to 5,000 died Soviet soldiers, mainly buried in the nearby Franciscan Pobrežje Cemetery.

== Daily life and treatment ==
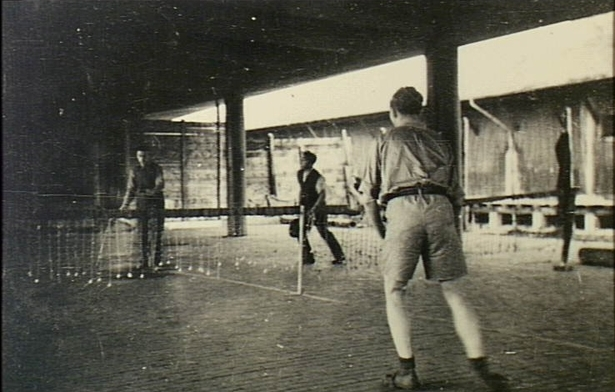
British prisoners of war played tennis near a customs warehouse where Soviet prisoners lived in deplorable conditions.

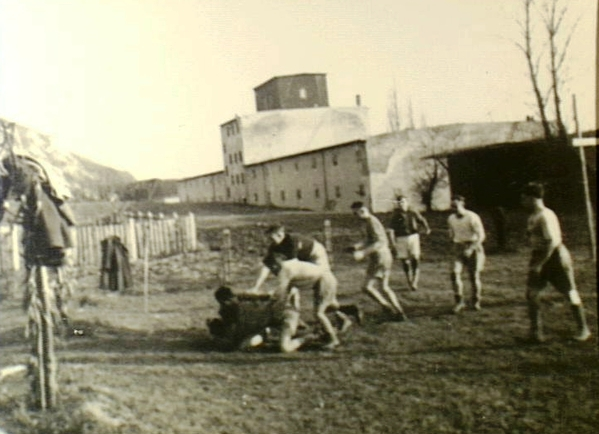
British captives while playing rugby near customs storage (in the background).

Ordinary soldiers had to work in the factories; they took part in construction work, reconstruction of roads and railways, and removing rubble and unexploded bombs. Western Allied soldiers had free daily passage and movement outside the camp complex. A Red Cross delegation could visit them. They could organise sports games (rugby, football, and indoor tennis) and cultural and artistic activities (theatre performances, the publication of a French newspaper, and book reading).

The story of the Soviet prisoners was severely different and tragic. Unprotected by the humanitarian organisations, the Red Army prisoners were forced to live in a barricaded, guarded, and wired camp complex whose purpose was the destruction of its inmates. They arrived in Maribor in overcrowded, sealed cattle wagons of freight trains. Upon arrival, they were starving and freezing; their physical condition was poor. Many died during transport or on arrival. They were beaten, shamed, mocked, tortured, shot, and deliberately subjected to psychophysical exhaustion (intentional starvation, malnutrition, diseases and labour work) in the camp.

== Camp command ==
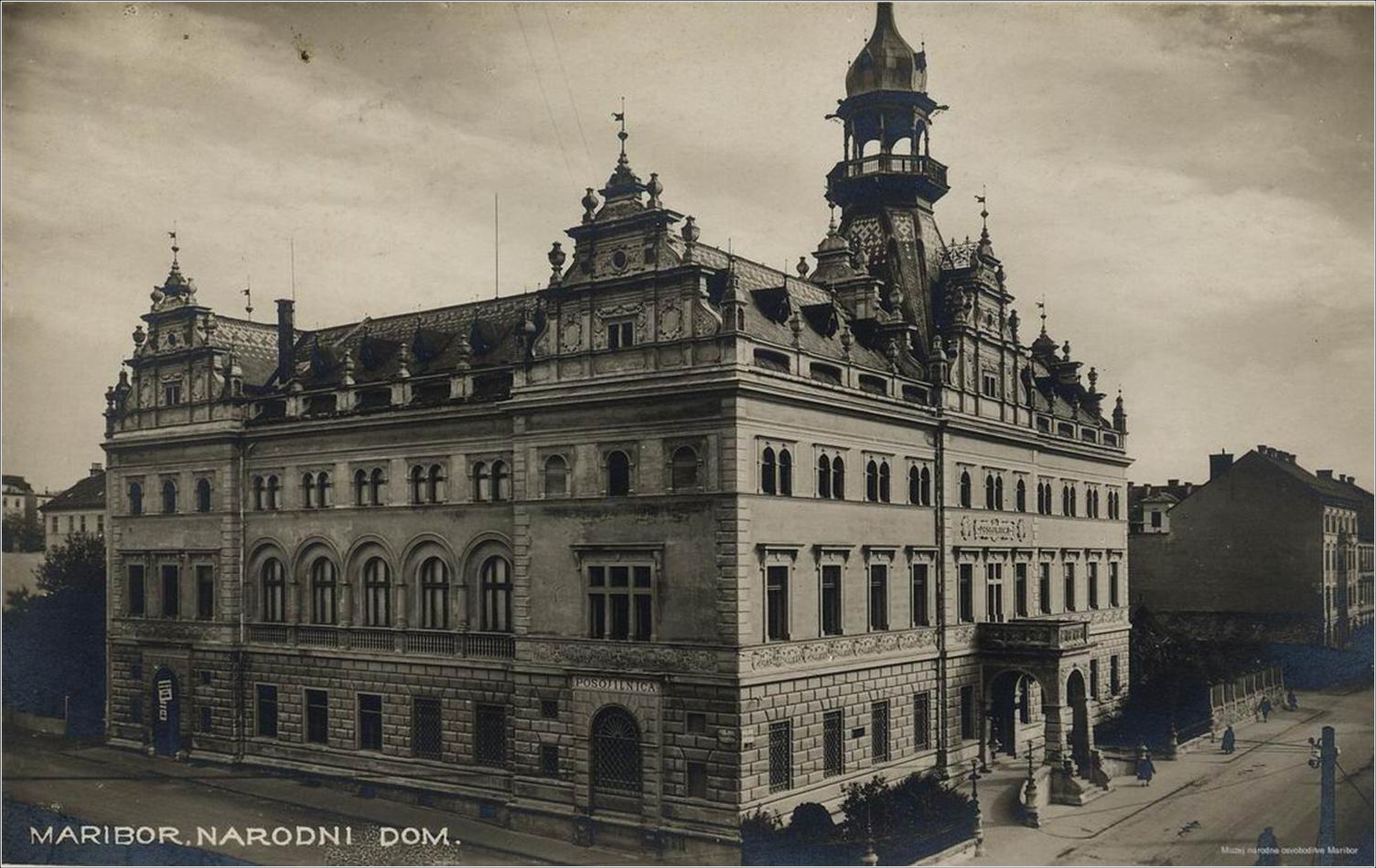
The command headquarters was located in the National Hall in the city centre of Maribor.

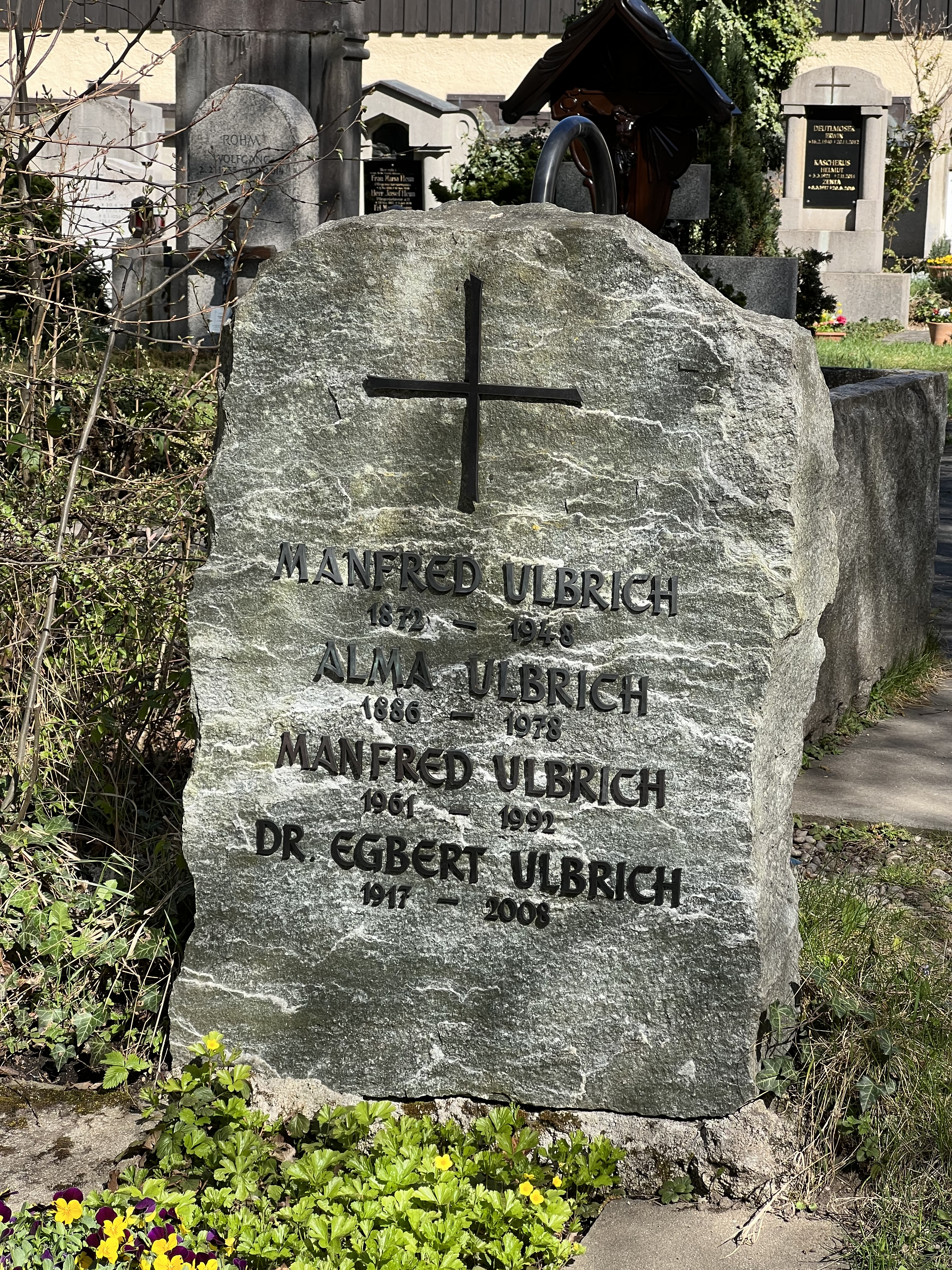
Manfred Ulbrich's grave is in a small cemetery in the municipality of Haar (eastern district of Munich), where his wife Alma, their son Egbert and grandson Manfred are buried.

During its operation between June 1941 and October 1942, Stalag XVIII D was led by three commanders: Major Hugo Karl Paul von der Marwitz, Colonel Manfred Maximilian Ulbrich and Captain Pabst. Their deputy was Hermann Hüttenhain. During the command of the first commander Major Marwitz, Stammlager functioned as a destructive camp regarding the number of deaths and the treatment of prisoners. Therefore, he is given the highest level of guilt and responsibility for the implemented atrocities and crimes, and suffering, injustice, and death of prisoners of war inflicted on them. The command headquarters were located outside the camp in the National Home in the city centre of Maribor. Ulbrich and Marwitz died in 1948.

The camp was managed and administered by the camp command (Lagerkommandanturen), while the camp guards (Bewachungsmannschaften) were responsible for its security. On 9 August 1941, there were 14 officers, 11 officials, ten persons from the Sonderführer structure, 21 non-commissioned officers, and 55 guards in the camp complex, or a total of 111 men, who belonged to the camp leadership and security structure. Except for the leading commanders, most were housed in wooden shacks at the camp entrance.

== Dissolution ==
Due to the changed conditions on the world's battlefields, which resulted in a severe shortage of labour and military manpower and, consequently, in an improved and more humane attitude towards Soviet prisoners of war as well, the Stalag XVIII D was disbanded between October and November 1942. This led to the creation of labour camps (Kriegsgefangenenarbeitskommando) in the wider surrounding area with new markings. In the city area and the vicinity of Maribor, the following working units were established: 35 L (Landwirtschaft), 375 L, and 396 L Maribor (Cadet School) were established, where the POWs worked in agriculture, as well as GW (Gewerbliche Wirtschaft) 1046 (directly on the site of the former Stalag XVIII D), 56 GW Maribor, 64–68 GW Tezno (part of 86 GW Tezno), 102 GW Tezno, 113 GW Maribor, 121 GW Kamnica, and 144 GW Tezno (part of 86 GW Tezno). The prisoners of war within the GW worked for the needs of German industry: on the railways and in construction work (traffic routes, canals, and bridges, anti-aircraft installations, construction of the power station on the Drava River, plumber works, etc.). Living, food, and hygiene improved, and the mortality rate decreased.

== Escapes ==
Between the beginning of June and the end of July 1941, 22 prisoners of war escaped from Stalag XVIII D in Maribor. The largest and most spectacular escape from the prisoner-of-war camp in Melje (»The Crow's Flight«) occurred in 1944 when more than 90 prisoners escaped. It was organised by two prisoners, Ralph F. Churches (the Crow), an Australian, and Les Laws, an Englishman.

== History of IRC Maribor and contemporary activities ==
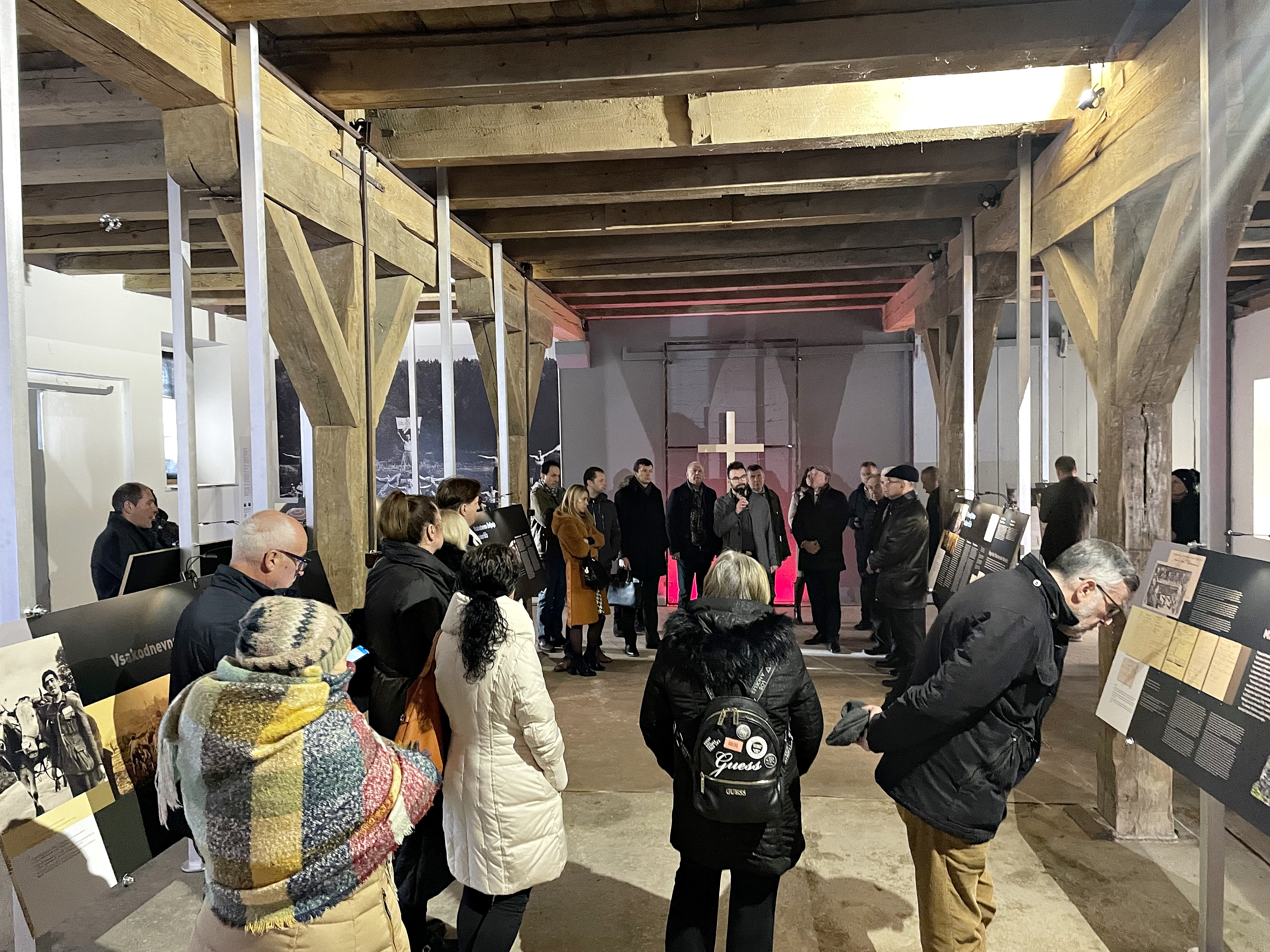
International Research Centre also regularly prepares original historical exhibitions and provides expertly guided pedagogical tours through exhibition content. The picture is an example of an author's guided tour through the exhibition "To Tear Out From the Oblivion" by author Daniel Siter.

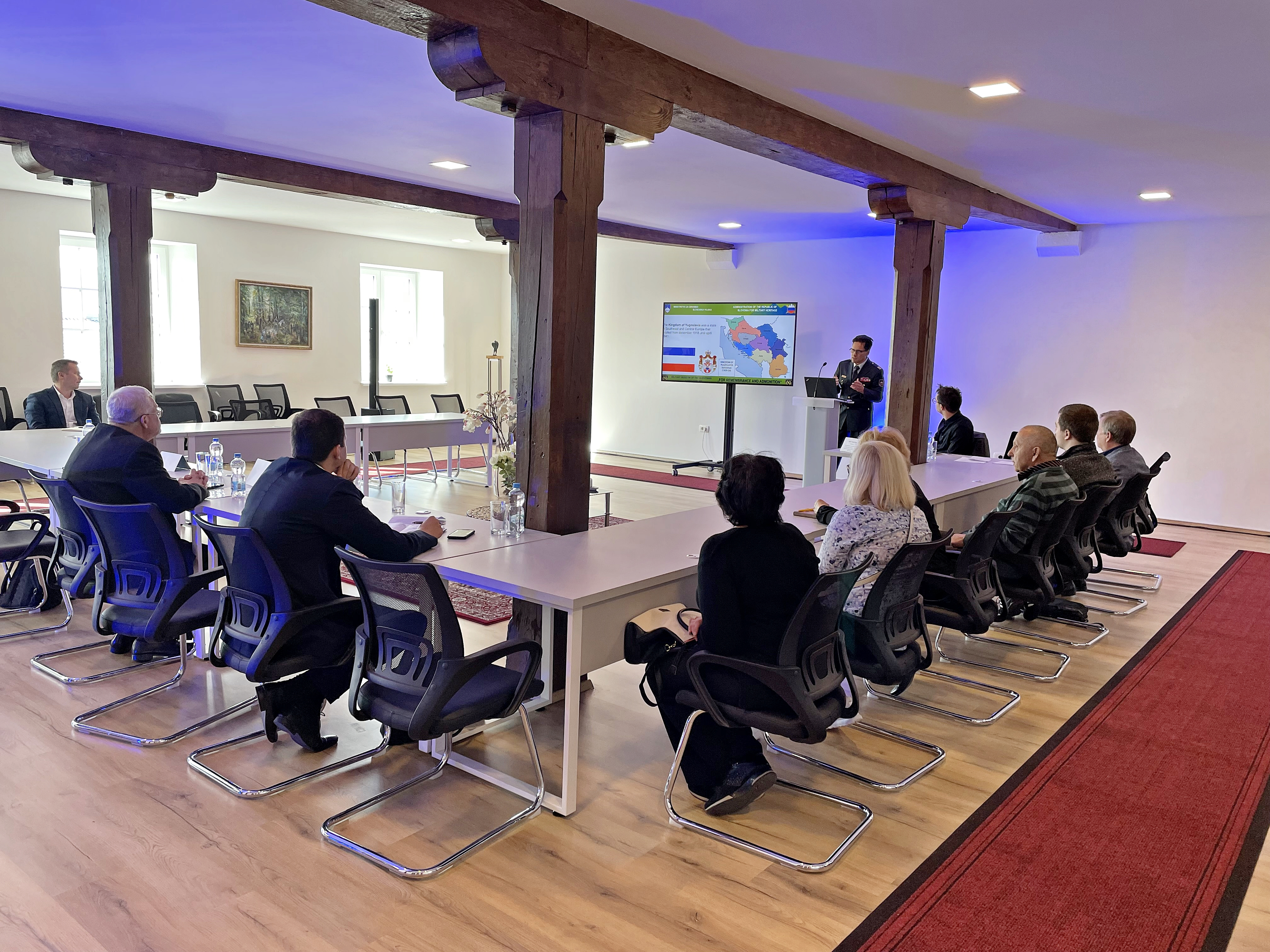
International Research Centre is active in organising scientific conferences with international participation. Among the leading group of listeners are younger generations.

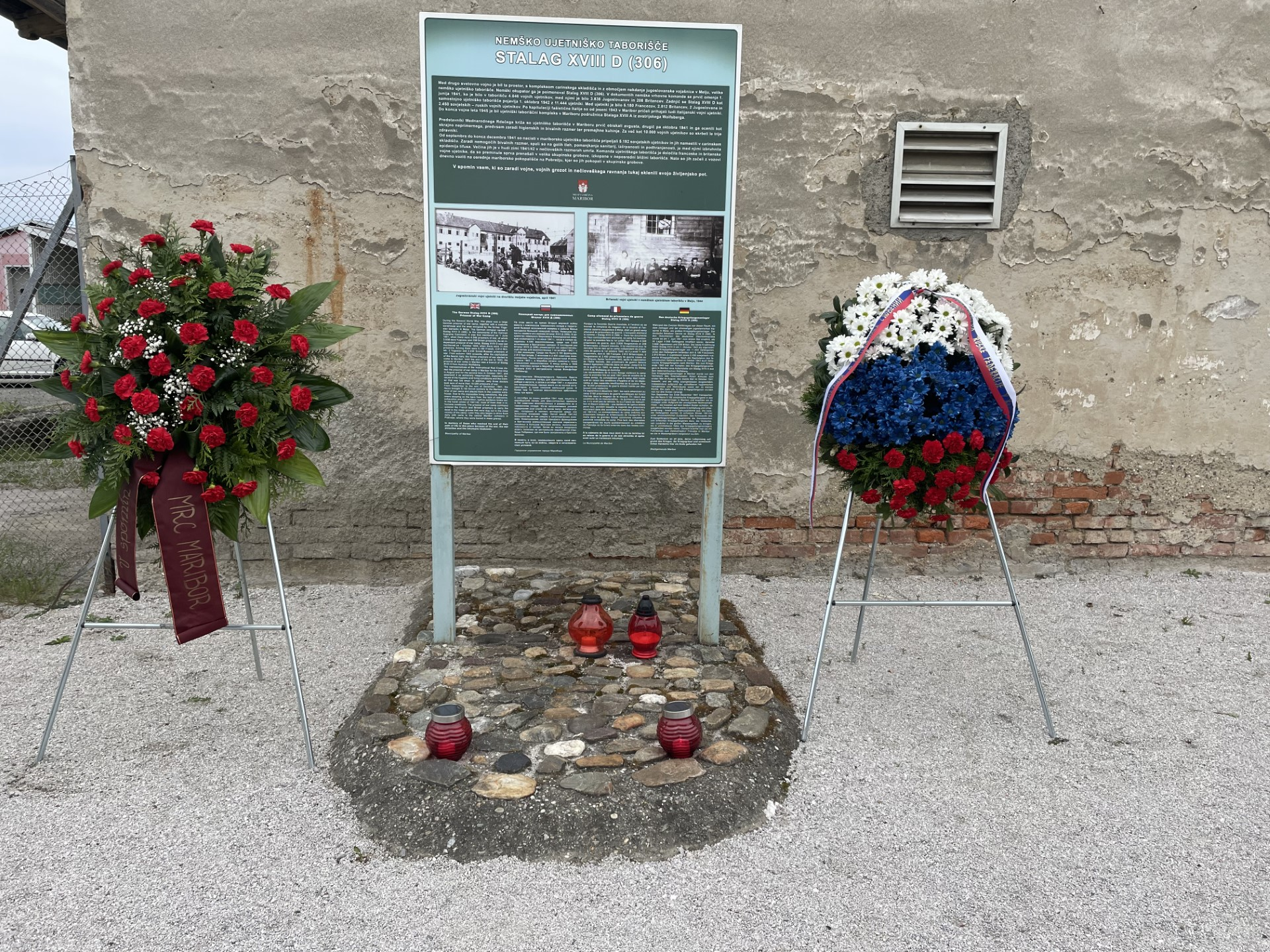
In September 2011, the President of the Republic of Slovenia, Dr Danilo Türk, visited the former camp and unveiled a memorial plaque in front of the camp building, symbolically marking the first foundation stone of the IRC Maribor.

In the Maribor – Melje area, on the premises of the former "Russian Camp" as part of the whole camp complex, operates the International Research Centre for Second World War (IRC Maribor) and Museum of Stalag XVIII D.

In 2017, the Municipality of Maribor bought the old warehouse building in Melje (now under monument protection) to create a museum commemorating Soviet POWs. IRC Maribor was established in December 2017 on the site of an abandoned old warehouse as a non-profit private institution following a memorandum that the Republic of Slovenia and the Russian Federation signed in February 2018 with the primary purpose and mission of exercising scientific research, academic, publishing, educational and memorial activities in the premises of the former Soviet prisoner-of-war camp and preserving historical memory, truth and lessons regarding the Nazifascist horrors and suffering caused by it. On 30 September 2021, the 80th anniversary of the train's arrival with the first Soviet POWs into occupied Slovenian territory, IRC ceremonially opened the "Train of Memory" project inside a former Russian Camp. Its honorary patron was the President of the Republic of Slovenia, Borut Pahor. IRC Maribor is led by director Janez Ujčič and general secretary Iza Verdel. The leading researcher and the head of scientific, educational, research and publishing activity is a Slovenian historian Daniel Siter from the international university Alma Mater Europaea - Faculty of Humanities, Institutum Studiorum Humanitatis, Ljubljana.
