= House of Dolls =

1953 novella by Ka-tzetnik 135633

- First English-language edition
- Author: Ka-tzetnik 135633
- Translator: Moshe M. Kohn
- Language: Hebrew
- Genre: Non-fiction novel
- Publisher: Simon & Schuster (first English edition)
- Publication date: 1953
- Publication place: Israel
- English publication date: 1955
- Media type: Print (hardback and paperback)

House of Dolls (Hebrew: בית הבובות, romanized: Beit HaBuvot) is a 1953 novella by Ka-tzetnik 135633. The novella describes "Joy Divisions", which were groups of women imprisoned in the concentration camps during World War II who were kept for the sexual pleasure of other inmates.

== Origins ==
Between 1942 and 1945, Auschwitz and nine other Nazi concentration camps contained camp brothels (Freudenabteilungen, or "Joy Divisions"), mainly used to reward cooperative non-Jewish inmates.

In the documentary film Memory of the Camps, a project supervised by the British Ministry of Information and the American Office of War Information during the summer of 1945, camera crews filmed women who had been forced into sexual slavery, reporting that "Dachau had its own brothel for the use of guards and favored prisoners." The filmmakers stated that as the women died they were replaced by fresh contingents from the concentration camp at Ravensbrück.

The novel tells the story of a Jewish woman named Daniella who is "forced to become a Sex Slave for German soldiers ... in Block 24 of Auschwitz-Stammlager." However, while Block 24 really did house a brothel, in reality "it was a brothel for prisoners. Members of the Wehrmacht and SS were not allowed to visit it. The forced prostitutes were mostly German or Polish—none of them were Jewish, neither was any of them called Daniella, as records of the Auschwitz administration show. A military brothel for German soldiers and SS guards also existed, but it was located outside of the camp, and all women there were German civilian prostitutes." While there certainly were reports by survivors of male German guards sexually abusing female Jewish inmates, "no archival evidence exists that points to the systematic rape of Jewish women in concentration camps or of their enslavement in Nazi brothels."

== Literature and scholarly references ==
In his essay "Narrative Perspectives on Holocaust Literature", Leon Yudkin uses House of Dolls as one of his key examples of the ways in which authors have approached the Holocaust, using the work as an example of "diaries (testimonies) that look like novels" due to its reliance on its author's own experiences.

Ronit Lentin discusses House of Dolls in her work Israel and the Daughters of the Shoah. In her book Lentin interviews a child of Holocaust survivors, who recalls House of Dolls as one of her first exposures to the Holocaust. Lentin notes that the "explicit, painful" story made a huge impact when published and states that "many children of holocaust survivors who write would agree ... that House of Dolls represents violence and sexuality in a manner which borders on the pornographic".

Na'ama Shik, researching at Yad Vashem, the principal Jewish organization for the remembrance of the victims of the Holocaust, considers the book as fiction. Nonetheless it is part of the Israeli high school curriculum.

The success of the book showed there was a market for Nazi exploitation popular literature, known in Israel as Stalags. However Yechiel Szeintuch from the Hebrew University rejects links between the smutty Stalags, and Ka-Tzetnik's works, which he insists were based on reality.

== In popular culture ==
British post-punk band Joy Division took their name from the reference in this book. One of their early songs, "No Love Lost", also contains a short excerpt from the novella.

Love Camp 7 (1968), considered to be the first Nazi exploitation film, is set in a concentration camp "Joy Division".

== See also ==
- Comfort women
- German camp brothels in World War II
- German military brothels in World War II
- German war crimes
- Japanese war crimes
- Rape during the occupation of Germany
- Recreation and Amusement Association
- Sexual slavery
