= Stalag =

German term for a type of prisoner-of-war camp

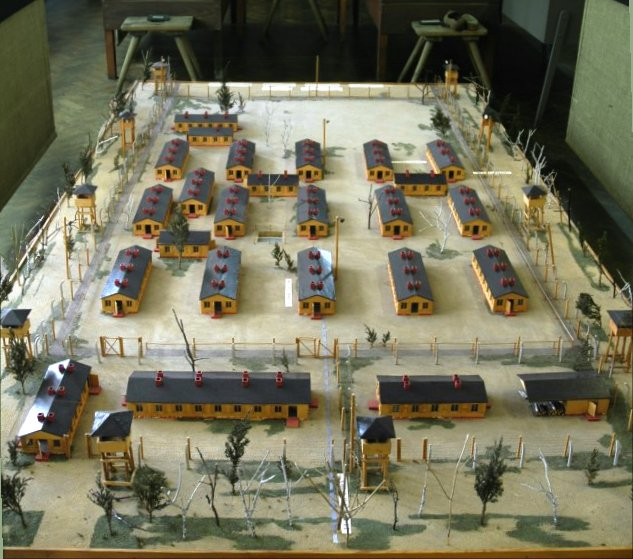
A model of one compound of the huge Stalag Luft III

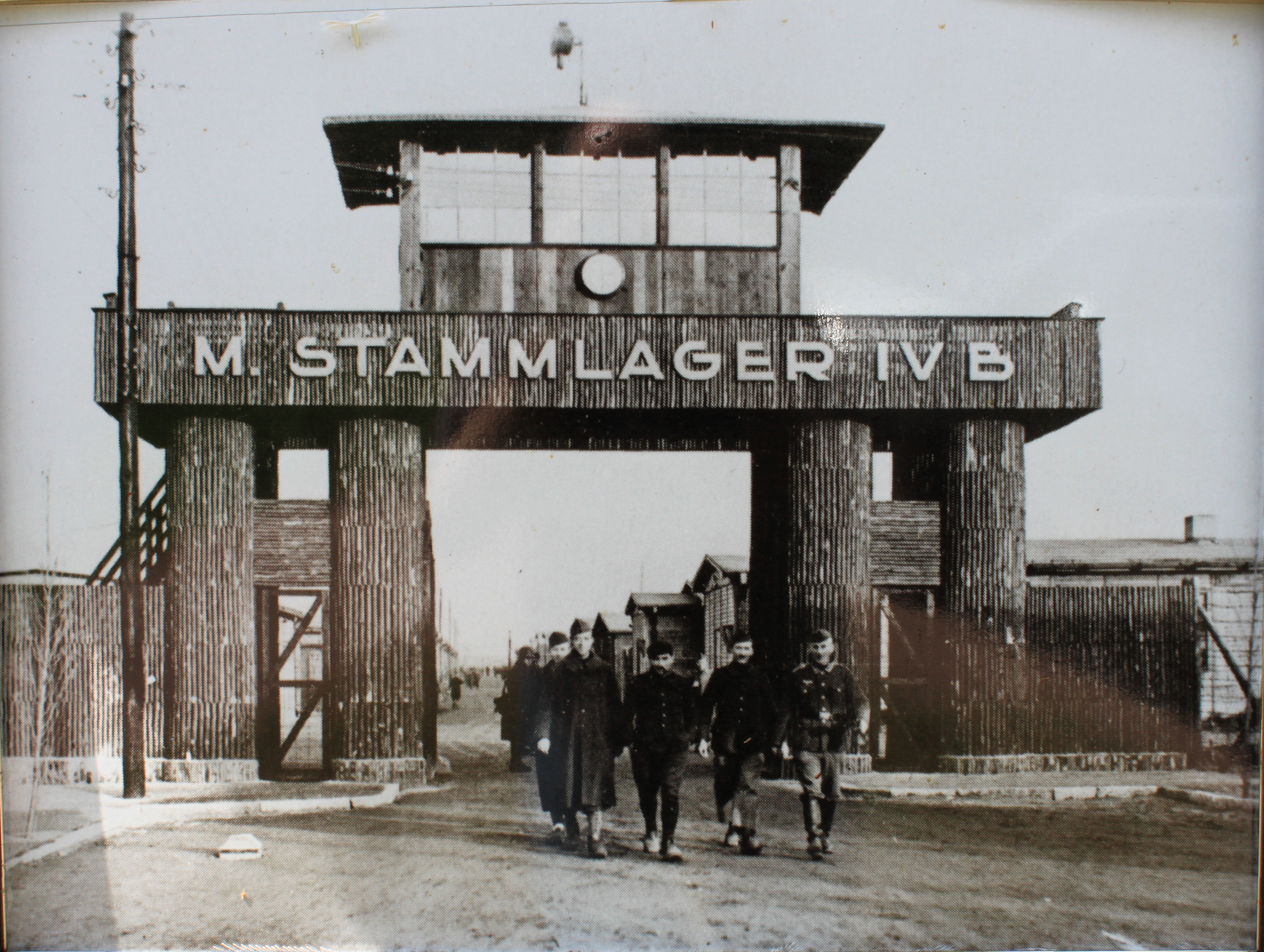
Entry to Stalag IV-B Mühlberg

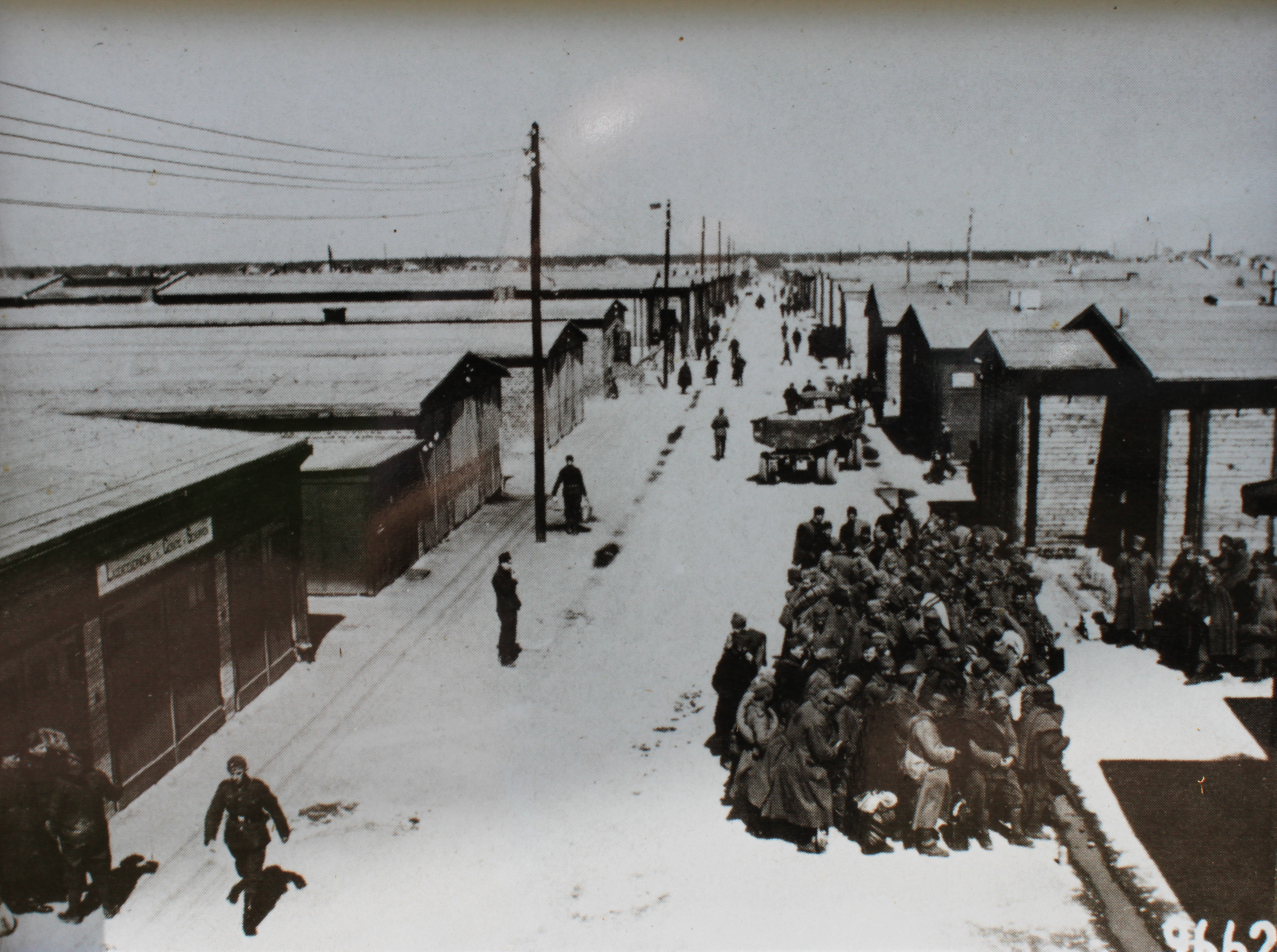
Main street in Stalag IV-B

In Germany, the term Stalag (/ˈstælæɡ/; German: [ˈʃtalak]) designated a prisoner-of-war camp. German: Stalag is a contraction of Stammlager, itself short for Kriegsgefangenen-Mannschaftsstammlager, literally "main camp for enlisted prisoners of war" (captured officers were kept in an Oflag). Therefore, Stalag literally means "main camp".

== Legal definitions ==
According to the Third Geneva Convention of 1929 and its predecessor, the Hague Convention of 1907, Section IV, Chapter 2, these camps were only for prisoners of war, not civilians. Stalags were operated in both World War I and World War II and were intended to be used for non-commissioned personnel (enlisted ranks in the US Army and other ranks in British Commonwealth forces). Officers were held in separate camps called Oflag. During World War II, the Luftwaffe (German air force) operated Stalag Luft in which flying personnel, both officers and non-commissioned officers, were held. The Kriegsmarine (German navy) operated Marlag for Navy personnel and Milag for Merchant Navy personnel.

Civilians who were officially attached to military units, such as war correspondents, were provided the same treatment as military personnel by the Conventions.

The Third Geneva Convention, Section III, Article 49, permits non-commissioned personnel of lower ranks to be used for work in agriculture and industry, but not in any industry producing war material. Further articles of Section III detail conditions under which they should work, be housed and paid. During World War II these latter provisions were consistently breached, in particular for Russian, Polish, and Yugoslav prisoners. According to Nazi ideology, Slavic people were regarded as rassisch minderwertig ("racially inferior").

Starvation was a deliberate policy in the Stalags, particularly with regard to Soviet prisoners of war. The camps consisted of a field with barbed wire around it, in which thousands of people were crammed together. There was usually no room to sit or lie down. Also, there was often no shelter from the weather, which could be very cold in the Polish and Belarusian winter. The food provided was too little to keep the prisoners alive. In the Soviet Stalags, the death rate during the entire war was 57.5 percent, although during the last months of 1941 this rate must have been much higher. In comparison, the mortality rate for Stalags for Western Allies was below 5 percent. More Soviet prisoners of war died every day in Nazi camps during the Autumn of 1941 than the total number of Western Allied POWs in the entire war.

Prisoners of various nationalities were generally separated from each other by barbed-wire fences subdividing each stalag into sections. Frequently prisoners speaking the same language, for example British Commonwealth soldiers, were permitted to intermingle.

== Arbeitskommandos ==
At each Stalag the German Army set up sub-camps called Arbeitskommando to hold prisoners in the vicinity of specific work locations, whether factories, coal-mines, quarries, farms or railroad maintenance. These sub-camps sometimes held more than 1,000 prisoners, separated by nationality. The sub-camps were administered by the parent stalag, which maintained personnel records and collected mail and International Red Cross packages and then delivered them to the individual Arbeitskommando. Any individuals who were injured in work, or became ill, were returned to the Lazarett (medical care facilities) at the parent stalag.

== Notable stalags ==
Stalag Luft III, a large prisoner of war camp near Sagan, Silesia, Germany (now Żagań, Poland), was the site of an escape attempt (later filmed as The Great Escape). On 24 March 1944, 76 Allied prisoners escaped through a 110 m (approximately 360 feet) long tunnel. Of these, 73 were recaptured within two weeks, and 50 of them were executed by order of Hitler in the Stalag Luft III murders.

The largest German World War II prisoner of war camp was Stalag VII-A at Moosburg, Germany. Over 130,000 Allied soldiers were imprisoned there. It was liberated by the U.S. 14th Armored Division following a short battle with SS soldiers of the 17th SS Panzer Grenadier Division on 29 April 1945.

Stalag III-C is notable for the escape of US paratrooper Joseph Beyrle, who subsequently joined a Soviet tank battalion commanded by Aleksandra Samusenko, which returned to liberate the camp.

== In popular culture ==
- The airmen in the show Hogan's Heroes were imprisoned in fictitious "Luft Stalag 13" near Hammelburg.
- The World War II play Stalag 17, which was made into the 1953 movie Stalag 17, was set in Stalag XVII-B, located near Krems, Austria.
- The movie Hart's War was set in Stalag VI-A, near Hemer/Iserlohn in Military District VI.
- In Israel of the 1950s–1960s, "stalag" was a generic term for pornographic material with a theme of sadistic sexual activity between female SS officers and prisoners of war. In 2007, Ari Libsker made a film on this topic, entitled Stalags.
- In 1993, the British TV movie Stalag Luft, starring Stephen Fry, featured a prisoner of war camp in which the German guards have abandoned the prisoners.
- In the 2012 film Red Tails, Ray "Ray Gun" Gannon, one of the Tuskegee Airmen, is imprisoned as a POW in Stalag 18 and is part of an escape from the camp.
- In the early 80s California punk band Stäläg 13 was an influential part of the Nardcore scene (Oxnard-Hardcore).
- In the 2014 strategy game The Escapists, Stalag Flucht is one of the playable maps.
- In 2024, the Stalag Luft life and evacuation on foot was depicted in the TV mini-series Masters of the Air.

== See also ==
- List of POW camps in Germany
- Stalag fiction
