= German camp brothels in World War II =

Brothels in Nazi concentration camps

German concentration camp brothels
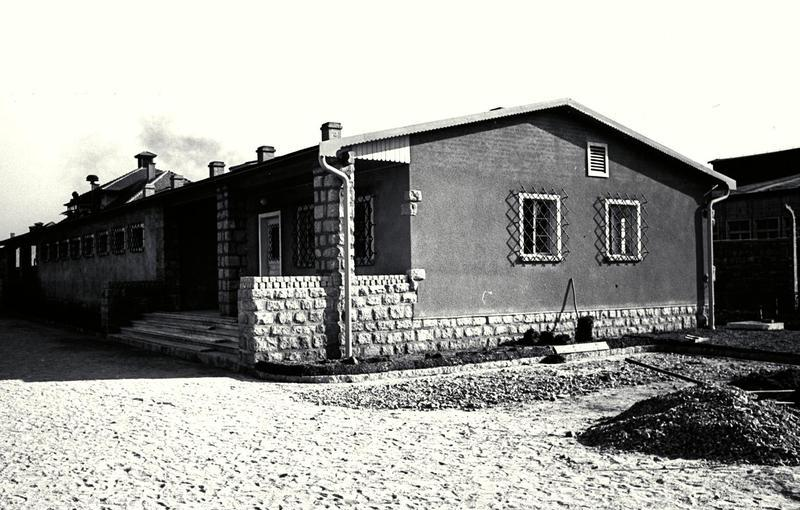
- Active camp brothel in Gusen, Austria (c. 1942)

In World War II, Nazi Germany established brothels in the concentration camps (Lagerbordell or Freudenabteilungen, "Pleasure Departments") to increase productivity among inmates. Their use was restricted to the more privileged Aryan prisoners, primarily the kapos, or "prisoner functionaries", and the criminal element. Jewish inmates were prohibited from using the brothels according to rules against racial mixing. In the end, the camp brothels did not produce any noticeable increase in the prisoners' productivity levels but, instead, created a market for coupons among the more privileged camp prisoners.

The women forced into these brothels came mainly from the women-only Ravensbrück concentration camp, except for Auschwitz, which used its own prisoners. In combination with the German military brothels in World War II, it is estimated that at least 34,140 female inmates were forced into sexual slavery during the Third Reich.

== History and operation ==
The first camp brothel was established in Mauthausen/Gusen in 1942. After 30 June 1943, a camp brothel existed in Auschwitz in "Block 24", and from 15 July 1943, in Buchenwald. The one in Neuengamme was established in early 1944, Dachau's in May 1944, Mittelbau-Dora's in late summer, and Sachsenhausen's on 8 August 1944. There are conflicting dates for the camp brothel in Flossenbürg: one source claims summer 1943; another states it was not opened until 25 March 1944.

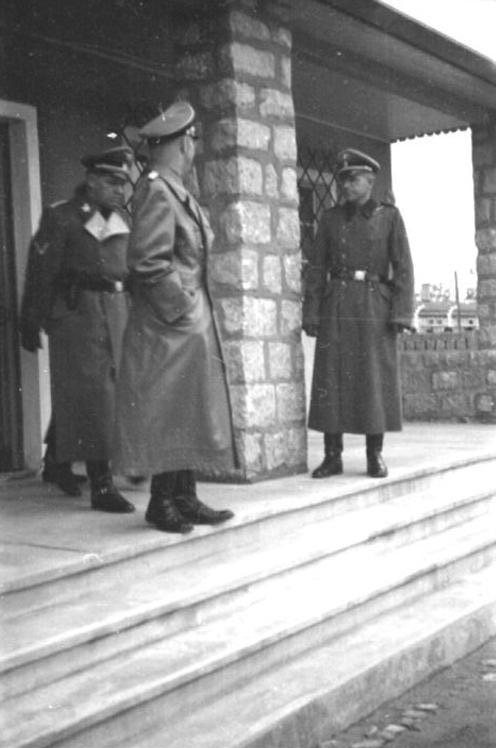
Heinrich Himmler inspecting the camp brothel in Mauthausen/Gusen (c. 1942)

The camp brothels were usually built as barracks surrounded by a barbed-wire fence, with small individual rooms for up to 20 female prisoners, controlled by a female overseer (Aufseherin). The women were replaced frequently due to exhaustion and illness, after which they were sent away to become regular inmates in Birkenau. The brothels were open only in the evenings. No Jewish male prisoners were allowed as patrons. Those with access to the customer lineup ("Aryan VIPs" only), had to sign up for a specific day and pay two Reichsmarks for a 20-minute "service" based on a predetermined schedule. The women were matched with clients by an SS-man. The people ironically described as "Aryan VIPs" included the Polish Christian prisoners, and those who had been sentenced to the camps for criminal activities and so wore the green triangles (hence the "green men" denomination). There is somewhat controversial evidence that in some of the brothels, women might have had tattoos inscribed on their chests saying Feld-Hure ("field whore"). Some of them underwent forced sterilizations as well as forced abortions, often resulting in death. At Auschwitz, the women "were mostly German or Polish—none of them were Jewish", and members "of the Wehrmacht and SS were not allowed to visit" them. "A military brothel for German soldiers and SS guards also existed, but it was located outside of the camp, and all women there were German civilian prostitutes." While there certainly were reports by survivors of male German guards sexually abusing female Jewish inmates at Auschwitz and elsewhere, "no archival evidence exists that points to the systematic rape of Jewish women in concentration camps or of their enslavement in Nazi brothels."

The brothels were mentioned in memoirs and novels by survivors, such as Ka-Tzetnik's 1953 novel House of Dolls, Primo Levi's 1947 memoir If This Is A Man, and Josef Kohout's The Men With the Pink Triangle, written under the pseudonym of Heinz Heger, but were not a subject of academic study until the mid-1990s, when publications by female researchers broke the scholarly silence.

Sometimes the SS enticed women into serving in the brothels by promising them more humane treatment or reductions of their indefinite sentence. This caused anger or envy among other female inmates. Nina Michailovna, a Russian camp prisoner, reported: "When we found out that a girl in our block was chosen, we caught her and threw a blanket on her and beat her up so badly that she could hardly move. It wasn't clear if she would recover. They just wanted to have a better life and we punished them this way."

== Homosexual prisoners and camp brothels ==
Heinrich Himmler also attempted to use these brothels to teach pink triangle prisoners "the joys of the opposite sex", i.e., as "therapy" for their homosexuality. Heger claims that Himmler directed that all gay prisoners were to make compulsory visits to the camp brothel once per week as a means of "curing" them of homosexuality.

== Cultural references ==
The French documentary Night and Fog mentioned the existence of concentration camp brothels as early as 1955. This film, by director Alain Resnais, included extensive original footage of the camps and was based on interviews with survivors. German concentration camp brothels were also re-enacted in fictional Nazi exploitation films made in the 1970s such as Ilsa, She Wolf of the SS, Last Orgy of the Third Reich, Love Camp 7, SS Experiment Camp and Nazi Love Camp 27. Examples of Israeli literature on the subject include writer's Yehiel De-Nur's novel The House of Dolls (published using his concentration camp number Ka-Tsetnik 135633 as a pseudonym) and the Stalag fiction genre.

Czech author Arnošt Lustig wrote a novel Lovely Green Eyes (ISBN 1559706961), which tells a story of a 15-year-old Jewish girl deported to a camp and forced to serve in a brothel during World War II. In the 1950s-set Australian television drama A Place to Call Home, the main character, Sarah Adams, is an Australian who converted to Judaism and was imprisoned at Ravensbrück concentration camp before being forced into a camp brothel.

The English rock band Joy Division was named after the camp brothels at Auschwitz as described in the 1953 novel House of Dolls.

== See also ==
- Comfort women (Japan)
- German war crimes
- Recreation and Amusement Association (Japan)
- Sexual slavery by Germany during World War II
- War rape by German forces during World War II
- Stalag fiction
