= Stalags (film) =

- Film Poster
- Directed by: Ari Libsker
- Written by: Ari Libsker
- Produced by: Barak Heymann; Ari Libsker
- Edited by: Morris Ben-Mayor
- Distributed by: Film Forum
- Release date: April 9, 2008
- Running time: 63 minutes
- Country: Israel
- Language: Hebrew

Stalags (Hebrew: סטאלגים, Stalagim, also known in English as Stalags: Holocaust and Pornography in Israel) is a 2008 Israeli documentary film produced by Barak Heymann and directed by Ari Libsker. The film examines the history of Stalags, pornography books that featured female Nazi officers sexually abusing male camp prisoners. The pocket books broke sales records and sold hundreds of thousands of copies in Israel in the 1960s during the trial of Adolf Eichmann. After the authors of the books were accused of distributing antisemitic pornography, the popularity of the books declined. The documentary opened in limited release on April 9, 2008.

== Critical reception ==
The documentary received mixed reviews from critics. As of May 5, 2008, the review aggregator Rotten Tomatoes reported that 50% of critics gave the film positive reviews, based on 12 reviews. Metacritic reported the film had an average score of 53 out of 100, based on 5 reviews.
