= Ralph Churches =

Australian Army soldier

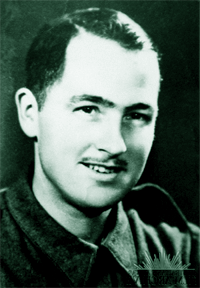
- Born: 22 November 1917; Adelaide, South Australia, Australia
- Died: 18 October 2014 (aged 96); Adelaide, South Australia, Australia
- Spouse: Ronte Churches (m. 1940)
- Military career
- Allegiance: Australia
- Branch: Australian Army
- Service years: 1940–1944
- Rank: Sergeant
- Service number: SX5286
- Unit: 2/48th Battalion
- Awards: British Empire Medal

Ralph Churches BEM (22 November 1917 – 18 October 2014) was an Australian army private who planned and carried out the biggest and most successful POW escape of World War II. One of eight children, Ralph was a 22-year-old bank teller when he enlisted in the Second Australian Imperial Force's 2/48th Battalion on 14 June 1940.

== The Escape ==
While fighting in Greece in May 1941, Ralph was captured and sent to Stalag 306 POW camp in Maribor, Slovenia with 100 other POWs. Determined to escape, he began mastering the German language. Each day prisoners were taken to a work site, assigned to the job of re-laying train tracks destroyed by Allied bombers. Watching his fellow soldiers die of starvation and disease, in unconscionably grim conditions, hardened Ralph's resolve to devise of a large-scale escape plan. He soon became the camp interpreter to the Kommandant, and was also elected camp leader where he communicated prisoners' grievances to the Kommandant.

While out on a work detail, Ralph and several other prisoners managed to escape the guards, but Ralph couldn't help but think of the fate of the 100 other POWs still imprisoned in the Maribor camp. He convinced the others to return for the rest of the prisoners. This time, they liberated all 100 prisoners of the Maribor work camp. They set off on foot, 200 miles south from Maribor to Semič, the only safe route to flee occupied Europe.

The long trek took them through dense forests, over mountains and fording multiple rivers, with German scouting parties trailing close behind. The POWs took shelter in the trees from the constant overfly of German surveillance despatched by the Luftwaffe. Suffering hunger, exhaustion, injuries and in-fighting, some of Ralph's fellow POWs, fearing for their lives, wanted to return to the prison camp. Ralph convinced the POWs to continue on their escape south. When they finally reached a makeshift airstrip in Semič, in southern Slovenia, a Douglas DC-3 flew them all to freedom; across the Adriatic Sea to an Allied base in Bari in south-eastern Italy (by this time, in the summer of 1944, the Germans were retreating north out of Italy).

== The Homecoming ==
Ralph planned and led the largest and most successful escape of World War II. For helping all 105 POWs escape from the Nazi work camp, he was awarded the British Empire Medal. By November 1944, Churches was back in Australia and reunited with wife Ronte, after four years apart. Ralph turned down an offer to spy for the Australian Secret Intelligence Service (ASIS), instead resuming his pre-war employment with the bank, where he achieved notable success in the insurance industry. Military authorities demanded that all 105 escapees stay quiet about their escape, and sign the Official Secrets Act, claiming that "it would protect the secrecy of the escape route" for further allied personnel fleeing conflict zones in the region. Ralph honored the Secrets Act by remaining silent about the escape for 40 years, until 1985, at the age of 72, when he was released from the stricture of the Official Secrets Act, and finally able to speak freely to the media about the escape. In the 1970s, he twice traveled to Slovenia with fellow veterans. Ralph died in 2014 at the age of 96.

== Conflicting accounts of the Escape ==
There are several known sources regarding the details of the escape, and several secondary sources which draw largely on the account of Ralph. Ralph's version of events has been published in newspaper articles in 1944, 2009 and 2011. Australian POW Private Walter Gossner provided a detailed account of his experiences of being part of the freed POWs. He gives the date of the escape as 27 September 1944, four weeks after the date given by Ralph, and his overall account varies significantly from that of Ralph's.

== Comparison to "The Great Escape" ==
On 24 March 1944, Squadron leader Roger Bushell organized the escape from Stalag Luft III, where 3 POWs made it home alive. Five months later, on 30 August, Ralph Churches organized the escape from Stalag XVIIID (also known as Stalag 306), where 105 POWs made it home alive.

== Media ==
In 2017, British broadcaster Monty Halls produced and presented a documentary about Ralph's escape. Halls also writes of "Ralph Churches' greatest escape" in his 2018 book Escaping Hitler. 2019 is the 75th anniversary of the Maribor-to-Semič escape.
