= Stalag fiction =

Book series in Israel

The front and back cover of Stalag 13, an example of Stalag literature, shows the sexualization of female SS guards characteristic of the genre.

Stalag fiction (Hebrew: סטאלג) was a genre of erotic literature which flourished in Israel during the early 1960s. The genre consisted of pornographic Nazi exploitation books, depicting the female Nazi officers in prisoner-of-war camps (stalags) sexually abusing male Allied prisoners. Many of these books purported to be real accounts from actual Allied prisoners-of-war, and avoided featuring Jewish characters in an effort to prevent them from becoming controversial. The genre came to an end during the Eichmann trial due to being banned by the Israeli government. They are mostly no longer available in traditional publication format, but with the advent of the Internet works in the genre have been circulated via peer-to-peer file sharing.

== Premise ==
Purported to be translations of English-language books by prisoners in concentration camps, these books were highly pornographic accounts of imprisonment, generally of Allied prisoners of war, sexual abuse by female Schutzstaffel guards (or in some cases by Japanese guards), and the prisoners' eventual revenge, which usually consisted of the rape and murder of their tormentors. The books, with titles like I Was Colonel Schultz's Private Bitch, were especially popular among adolescent boys, often the children of concentration camp survivors.

== History ==
Groups of Israeli publishers began to publish dime novel-format memoirs, describing abuse, particularly sexual abuse, in the concentration camps. Sold in magazine kiosks, the novels, ostensibly first-person memoirs, became best-sellers. According to Israeli filmmaker Ari Libsker, "the Holocaust pictures that I saw, as one who grew up here, were of naked women."

Although still available underground, certain titles earned the ire of the establishment, and efforts were made to find and destroy them. The advent of the Internet has allowed for peer-to-peer file sharing and thus made censorship attempts far harder.

In 2003, the genre re-entered public debate in Israel with the research of popular culture analyst Eli Eshed. As a result of that research, Libsker featured the books in a documentary film, which was titled Stalags.

== See also ==
- Ilsa, She Wolf of the SS
- Nazi exploitation
- Stalags (film)
- Nazi chic
