= Hawker Hurricane in Yugoslav service =

Royal Yugoslav Air Force plane (1938–1941)

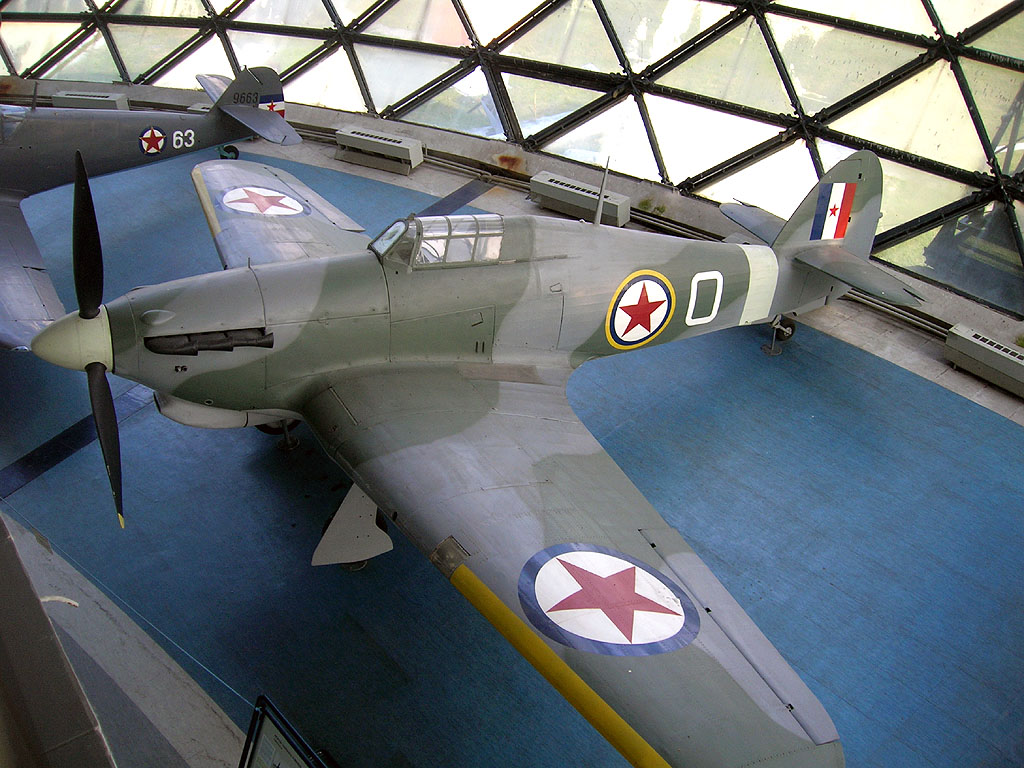
- A Hawker Hurricane Mk IV of No. 351 Squadron RAF at the Museum of Aviation in Belgrade

General information
- Type: Fighter; Fighter-bomber
- Manufacturer: Hawker and Zmaj
- Primary user: 2nd Fighter Regiment; 4th Fighter Regiment; No. 351 Squadron RAF (1944–1945); No. 352 Squadron RAF (1944)

History
- In service: 1938–1941; 1944–1945; 1945–1951

In late 1937, the Royal Yugoslav Air Force (Serbo-Croatian Latin: Vazduhoplovstvo Vojske Kraljevine Jugoslavije, VVKJ) placed an order with Hawker Aircraft for twelve Hawker Hurricane Mk I fighters, the first foreign purchase of the aircraft. The VVKJ operated the British Hawker Hurricane Mk I from 1938 to 1941. Between 1938 and 1940, the VVKJ obtained 24 Hurricane Mk Is from early production batches, marking the first foreign sale of the aircraft. Twenty additional aircraft were built by Zmaj under licence in Yugoslavia. When the country was drawn into World War II by the German-led Axis invasion of April 1941, a total of 41 Hurricane Mk I's were in service as fighters. They achieved some successes against Luftwaffe aircraft, but all Yugoslav Hurricanes were destroyed or captured during the 11-day invasion.

In mid-1944, the Yugoslav Partisans formed two Royal Air Force squadrons, Nos. 351 and 352, which both operated Hurricane fighter-bombers. No. 351 Squadron flew Hurricane Mk IICs during training and was later equipped with Hurricane Mk IVs, and No. 352 briefly flew Hurricane Mk IICs during training before re-equipping with Supermarine Spitfire Mk Vs. Both squadrons operated as part of No. 281 Wing RAF of the Balkan Air Force, conducting ground attack missions in support of Partisan operations until the end of the war. Hurricanes remained in service with the post-war Yugoslav Air Force until the early 1950s.

== Acquisition ==
A three-view drawing of the Hawker Hurricane Mk I

In early 1938, the VVKJ placed an order with Hawker Aircraft for twelve Hawker Hurricane Mk I fighters, the first foreign purchase of the aircraft. The British government was willing to supply excess Hurricanes to nations that were likely to oppose German expansion because the rate of production of the aircraft slightly exceeded the capability of the RAF to introduce it at the time. The first of these aircraft destined for Yugoslav service was No. 205 (formerly L1751), which was flown from the United Kingdom to Belgrade via France and Italy, arriving on 15 December 1938. The first batch of aircraft were fitted with a Rolls-Royce Merlin II engine driving a two-blade wooden propeller. The initial order was followed by a second order of twelve (N2718–N2729), which were fitted with Merlin III engines driving a three-blade variable-pitch propeller, and were delivered in February and March 1940. At the same time, the Yugoslav government applied to build more under licence. Once the negotiations were successfully concluded, production lines were established at the Rogožarski plant in Belgrade and the Zmaj factory in nearby Zemun. The two plants were expected to build forty and sixty of the aircraft respectively, at a rate of twelve per month. Of the locally built aircraft, only twenty were completed by Zmaj; the Rogožarski plant did not produce any. A total of 44 aircraft were put into service with the VVKJ.

== Operational service ==
=== Royal Yugoslav Air Force ===
Once in service, Hurricane Mk Is were used to equip the 52nd Fighter Group of the 2nd Fighter Regiment based at Knić, and the 33rd and 34th Fighter Groups of the 4th Fighter Regiment based at Bosanski Aleksandrovac. Hurricanes were also operated by the Independent Fighter Squadron of the 81st Bomber Group and by the Air Training School, both based at Mostar. All of these aircraft were deployed in the fighter/interceptor role. Immediately prior to the German-led Axis invasion of Yugoslavia in April 1941, 41 of the original 44 Hurricanes were serviceable. They were allocated as follows:

Allocation of Hurricane Mk I aircraft, 6 April 1941
Formation	Unit	Location	Aircraft	Notes
2nd Fighter Regiment	52nd Fighter Group	Knić	15	163rd and 164th Squadrons
4th Fighter Regiment	33rd Fighter Group	Bosanski Aleksandrovac	13	105th and 106th Squadrons
4th Fighter Regiment	34th Fighter Group	Bosanski Aleksandrovac	7	108th Squadron
—	81st Bomber Group	Mostar	3	Independent Fighter Squadron
—	Air Training School	Mostar	3	—

At 06:45 on 6 April 1941, the Luftwaffe launched Operation Retribution, a series of concerted bombing attacks on Belgrade that coincided with air and ground attacks throughout the country. Several waves of German aircraft approached Belgrade during the day, initially Junkers Ju 87 "Stuka" dive-bombers escorted by fighters. About 08:00, Hurricanes of the 52nd Fighter Group engaged the second wave as it departed after bombing the city; one of the dive-bombers was shot down by three pilots from the 163rd Squadron. For the remainder of the first day of the invasion, the Hurricanes of the VVKJ saw little action, despite constant patrolling between Čačak, Kraljevo, and Kragujevac. Few of the aircraft had radio sets, so the fighters usually arrived too late to take part in the fighting. Two 4th Fighter Regiment machines were tasked with escorting Bristol Blenheim Mk I light bombers to attack targets in Austria, but they lost sight of the bombers in cloud cover. One of the pilots then attempted to intercept some German Messerschmitt Bf 109 fighters.

Airfields from which Hurricanes operated during the April 1941 invasion

The following day, the 2nd Fighter Regiment continued to patrol over central Serbia, protecting factories at Kraljevo and Kragujevac from potential German air attacks that never occurred. The 4th Fighter Regiment was also active, patrolling over Bosnia and Croatia, but saw little action except for attempts to intercept German reconnaissance aircraft. Two of the Air Training School Hurricanes scrambled to intercept a small formation of Junkers Ju 88 bombers as they flew over Mostar towards Sarajevo. They were both hit by return fire, wounding one pilot and forcing him to crash land. The other pilot continued pursuing the bombers when he was attacked by a group of German Bf 109s. He was severely wounded, bailed out, and eventually died from loss of blood. Another Hurricane was also claimed by the Germans on 7 April.

On 8 April, the main VVKJ effort was directed towards a German ground thrust through the Kačanik gorge in southern Kosovo. By this time, the VVKJ had lost over 60 per cent of its aircraft; 70 aircraft from the remnants of various bomber and fighter units were assembled for the attack. Hurricanes of the 52nd Fighter Group made up the last wave of attacks on the 13 kilometres (8 mi) of closely packed convoys. Flying beneath low cloud in very poor weather, both squadrons strafed the Germans. One Hurricane was hit and crash-landed by the road, its pilot evading capture. In the north of the country, patrolling Hurricanes of the 4th Regiment clashed with German fighters on several occasions, without result. Other 4th Regiment Hurricanes escorted another bomber mission against targets in southern Austria. The remaining five Hurricanes of the 105th Squadron relocated to Veliki Radinci, where other surviving aircraft had also concentrated.

The following day, heavy snow fell in some areas of Yugoslavia, grounding the 52nd Fighter Group Hurricanes at Knić. In the north, a major air battle developed between Rovine and Bosanski Aleksandrovac, involving Hurricanes of both the 106th and 108th Squadrons. The Yugoslavs shot down one or two Bf 109s, but lost two Hurricanes in the process. By 10 April, the VVKJ was disintegrating quickly in the face of the successful German onslaught, but Hurricanes of the 105th Squadron were able to get airborne despite the continuing poor weather, patrolling for and engaging German aircraft without result. At Knić, rumours of the approach of German ground forces led the 164th Squadron to attempt to fly its Hurricanes to a safer airfield. Five machines got into the air, but almost immediately two of them collided, and another flew into a mountain wreathed in fog. The two surviving pilots returned safely to Knić. Meanwhile, the Hurricanes of the 163rd Squadron had been rendered unserviceable by their crews to prevent their capture and use by the Germans. When it became clear that the rumours of approaching German forces were unfounded, desperate attempts were made to return the aircraft to flying condition. The same day, Hurricanes of the 4th Regiment scored a victory over a Bf 109 while chasing reconnaissance aircraft over Bosnia.

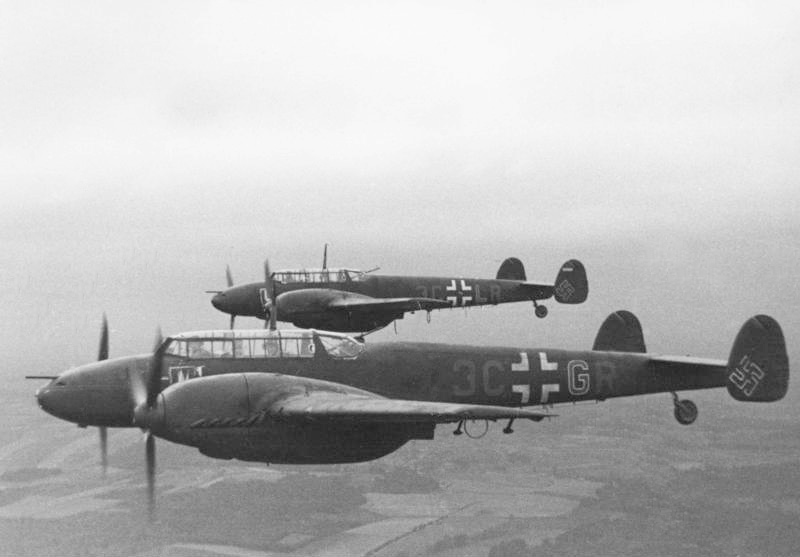
Yugoslav Hurricanes shot down a Messerschmitt Bf 110 heavy fighter (example pictured) on 11 April.

On 11 April, 4th Regiment Hurricanes shot down a Messerschmitt Bf 110 heavy fighter over Nova Gradiška. The following day, two or three of the remaining 105th Squadron Hurricanes were burned by ground crews at Veliki Radinci, while other machines from the same squadron flew to Bijeljina, where other aircraft had concentrated. This move had only just been completed when a large formation of German Bf 110s swept over the airfield and destroyed over two dozen aircraft, including all but one of the 105th Squadron Hurricanes. At Knić, approaching German vehicles caused the last two 163rd Squadron Hurricanes to scramble, flying to Zemun. The first pilot landed safely, but was immediately captured by armed Volksdeutsche. The other pilot, seeing that Zemun was not safe, broke off and tried to fly to Bjeljina, but ran out of fuel and was killed when he tried to crash-land near Valjevo. Even at this late stage, the 4th Regiment still had five or six airworthy Hurricanes. They continued to chase reconnaissance aircraft throughout the day, shooting down one Ju 88 near Banja Luka. When German bombers again attacked the airfields around Mostar, the one remaining Hurricane of the Air Training School attacked a Ju 88 but was hit by return fire, forcing the pilot to bail out.

The following day saw 4th Regiment Hurricanes again patrolling over Bosnia, downing another Bf 110, this time over Banja Luka. One aircraft was destroyed on 13 April, the pilot being badly wounded. On 14 April, one Hurricane was still serviceable at Nikšić in Montenegro. This aircraft clashed with Italian fighters on 14 or 15 April and was hit 37 times. Despite this, it was still airworthy on 16 April when its pilot attempted to fly it to Greece, but he was forced to return due to poor weather, after which the aircraft was abandoned. At least two Hurricanes were captured intact by the invading forces, but this marked the end of the Hawker Hurricane in VVKJ service, as all opposition to the Axis invaders ceased on 18 April, following the Yugoslav Supreme Command's unconditional surrender the previous day.

=== Yugoslav Partisans ===
==== Establishment ====
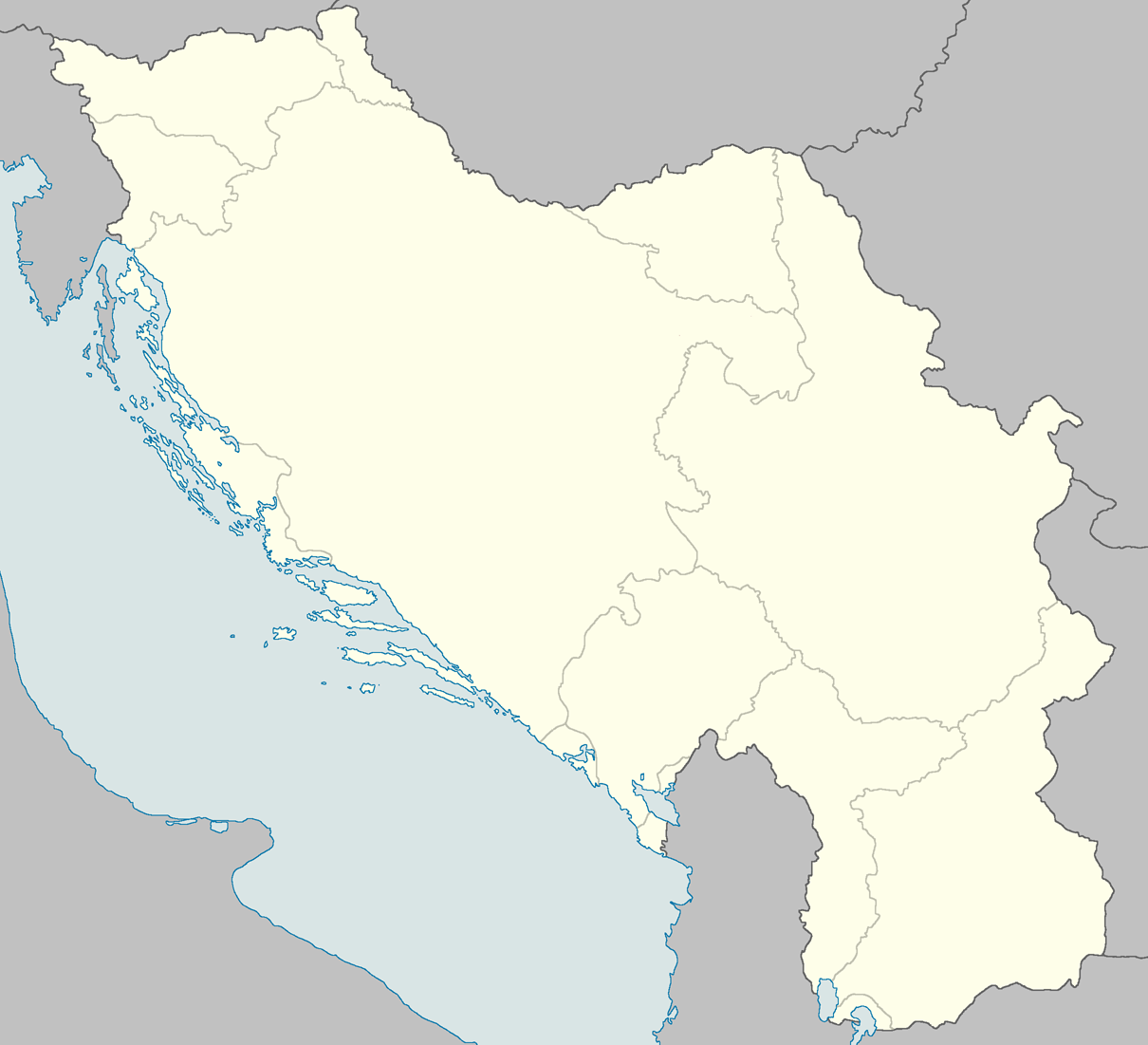
Map of Italy and occupied Yugoslavia showing the locations of the airfields at Cannae and Vis

The raising of Yugoslav Partisan-manned squadrons within the Royal Air Force (RAF) was discussed between the Partisan leader Josip Broz Tito and the head of the British mission to the Partisans, Brigadier Fitzroy Maclean, on 12 March 1944. As a result of this discussion, an agreement was concluded later that month for the RAF to train Yugoslav personnel who would man two squadrons, one of fighters and one of fighter-bombers. After completing training, these two squadrons were to conduct operations exclusively over Yugoslavia. It was agreed that the new squadrons would largely be staffed by former VVKJ personnel who had fled the country during the invasion and had later agreed to join the Partisans. The first squadron was raised at an airfield near Benghazi, Libya, as No. 352 (Yugoslav) Squadron RAF. Members took their Partisan oaths on 21 May 1944. Until late June, this squadron was equipped with Harvard training aircraft and Hurricane Mk IICs, which were then replaced by Supermarine Spitfire Mk Vs, which it operated until the end of the war. The Hurricane Mk IICs were handed over to a second Partisan-manned squadron, raised as No. 351 (Yugoslav) Squadron RAF, which was also established as a fighter-bomber unit in Libya on 1 July 1944.

During its work-up training, No. 351 Squadron was re-equipped with Hurricane Mk IVs. It completed training, including ground-attack practice runs, by 23 September. By 2 October, the squadron had been transferred to an airfield near Cannae in Italy to join No. 281 Wing RAF of the Balkan Air Force, a combined Allied organisation. The move was accompanied by complaints from the Partisan Supreme Command that the Hurricane was inferior to the Spitfire now being flown by No. 352 Squadron, and also the Hawker Typhoon. The complaints were ignored by the RAF, and the squadron operated Hurricane Mk IVs until the end of the war, as did No. 6 Squadron RAF, a British-manned squadron that also flew missions over Yugoslavia, even though the aircraft had been taken out of frontline service in the European theatre in March 1944. No. 351 Squadron was cleared for combat operations on 13 October, and from 18 October the squadron generally had 4–8 aircraft based at an airfield on the now Allied-held island of Vis in the Adriatic.

==== October–December 1944 ====
No. 351 Squadron flew its first mission on 13 October 1944; it involved six aircraft attacking an Axis supply convoy near the village of Aržano. On 20 October, aircraft from the squadron, supported by Spitfires from No. 352 Squadron, conducted rocket and strafing attacks on enemy columns near Metković that were withdrawing in the face of the advancing Partisan 26th Dalmatian Division. The mission was a success, but one aircraft was lost to ground fire.

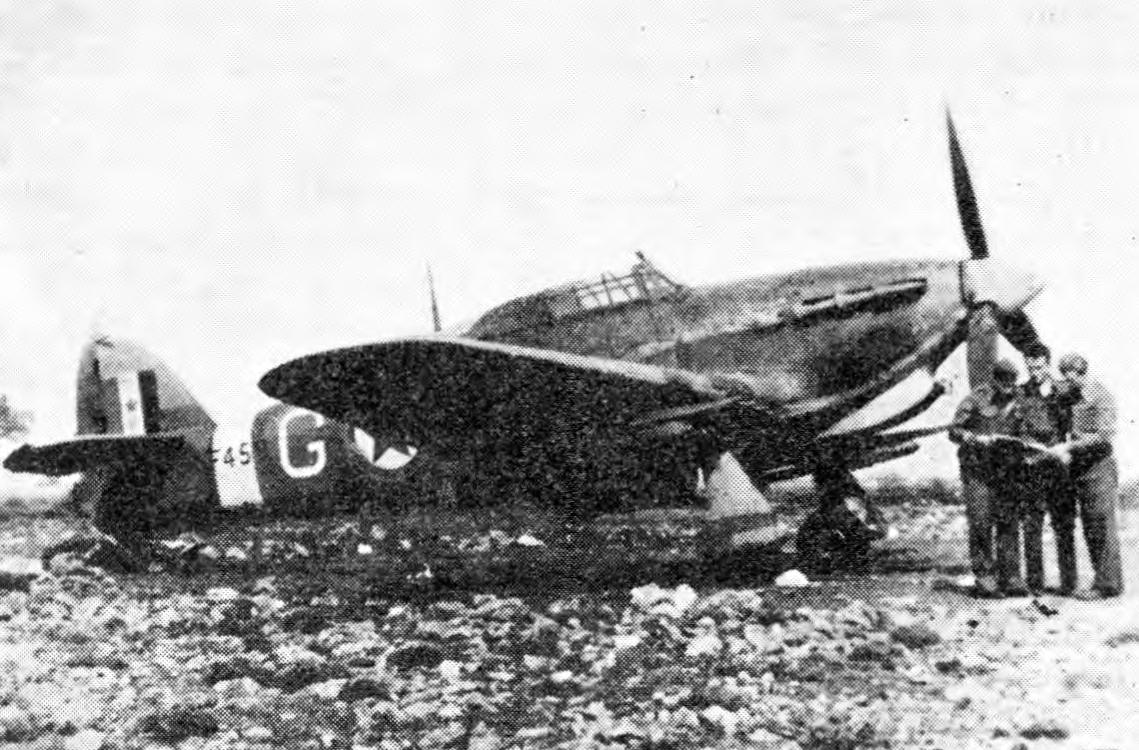
A Hurricane Mk IV of No. 351 Squadron

Nine days later, Hurricanes, escorted by a pair of Spitfires from No. 352 Squadron, flew a patrol over the island of Rab and adjacent areas of the Adriatic, but were unable to positively identify any targets. On 4 November, aircraft from No. 351 Squadron, again escorted by two Spitfires, were tasked with interdicting road communications between Bihać and Knin. One aircraft developed engine trouble and had to return to base, but the rest continued with the mission. They ran into heavy anti-aircraft fire near Knin, and one aircraft was shot down, the pilot bailing out and being captured by the Germans. The next mission, on 9 November, was hampered by extremely poor weather over the target area near Trebinje. One aircraft flew into a mountain, killing the pilot, and another suffered engine trouble and crash-landed near Trebinje, the pilot escaping unhurt.

On 3 December 1944, No. 351 Squadron carried out a successful rocket attack against Axis coastal defences on the Island of Lošinj, launching from Vis. This was followed by a period of scouting and reconnaissance over several Yugoslav regions, hitting targets of opportunity, sometimes escorted and supported by the Spitfires of No. 352 Squadron. No. 351 Squadron ranged widely, interdicting rail and road routes in eastern and western Bosnia and throughout Dalmatia, and attacking Axis maritime traffic off the Adriatic coast and islands. As the year drew to a close, operations became severely hampered by the worsening weather.

==== January–March 1945 ====
In January and February 1945, much better co-ordination was achieved between the two RAF squadrons and Partisan ground and maritime forces. This was done through the deployment of aviation liaison sections with the main Partisan formations, initially with the 8th Corps and then also the 5th Corps. On 4 January, four Hurricanes flew from Vis to attack an enemy convoy travelling between Mostar and Sarajevo. The convoy was located near Jablanica and seven trucks were destroyed. The aircraft went on to attack the railway station in Jablanica, damaging one locomotive and ten wagons. One Hurricane was damaged by anti-aircraft fire during the mission. On 22 January, Hurricanes escorted by Spitfires attacked a ship of 1,000 tonnes (980 long tons) off the island of Rab, firing sixteen rockets. Due to the minimal Luftwaffe presence over much of Yugoslavia, in many cases the Spitfire escorts from No. 352 Squadron were not needed to protect against enemy aircraft, so they also engaged ground and maritime targets alongside the Hurricanes of No. 351 Squadron.

In February, both squadrons provided support for the liberation of major towns, including Široki Brijeg, Nevesinje and Mostar, and patrolled and attacked targets of opportunity across Bosnia and Dalmatia. Specifically, they supported the Mostar operation of the 8th Corps, the work of the 11th Corps clearing the enemy from islands in the northern Adriatic, and also 5th Corps operations. Despite the presence of liaison sections with ground forces, procedures were not yet streamlined, and several friendly fire incidents occurred during the Mostar operation. In support of 11th Corps operations, Hurricanes attacked German headquarters, defences and naval traffic on and around the islands of Pag and Krk. On 7 February, Hurricanes of No. 351 Squadron were supporting 4th and 11th Corps and attacked a column of German trucks and wagons on the road between Gospić and Bihać when two of the aircraft collided, causing minor damage. Both aircraft crash-landed in friendly territory and were written off, but the pilots escaped unharmed. During February, No. 351 Squadron re-deployed to Zemunik on the mainland near Zadar.

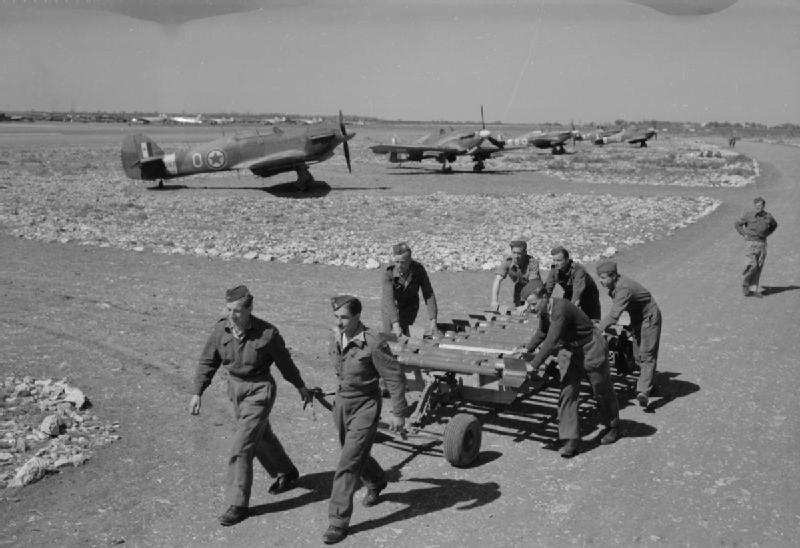
Partisan ground crews preparing to load RP-3 rockets onto the Hurricanes of No. 351 Squadron RAF at Prkos airfield

In early March, the formation of the 4th Army was accompanied by the development of even closer coordination and liaison with the two squadrons. Air marker panels began to be used to show the forward line of friendly troops and to identify friendly vehicles, and liaison teams were deployed with the commanders of lower-level formations to communicate directly with supporting aircraft. Operations continued across Bosnia and Dalmatia in March, and were extended to include support to advances in the Lika region and during the capture of Sarajevo and Bihać. As Axis forces withdrew west towards Zagreb, the Hurricanes of No. 351 Squadron continued to harry them, ambushing convoys and rocketing artillery positions. Between 1 January and 31 March 1945, the Hurricanes of No. 351 Squadron not only flew from Cannae and Vis, but also from the airfields at Zemunik and Prkos on the mainland. In the same period the squadron lost four aircraft and suffered damage to fifteen others. Of the lost aircraft, two were destroyed as a result of a collision, one was lost after engine failure, and only one was lost to anti-aircraft fire. Four aircraft were damaged by anti-aircraft fire, the remainder being damaged by fragments from their own rockets.

==== April–May 1945 ====
From the beginning of April 1945, the combat operations of No. 351 Squadron were focussed on supporting the offensives by the 4th Army in the Lika and Gorski kotar regions, along the Croatian coastline and in Istria. In particular, there was hard fighting in the islands of the northern Adriatic. On 5 April, one Hurricane was lost near Babin Potok when it flew into a mountain while supporting the 19th Dalmatian Division's attack on elements of the 11th Ustaše Division, resulting in the death of the pilot. During this period, all operations of No. 351 Squadron were carried out from the airfield at Zemunik. Two aircraft were destroyed and eighteen damaged. Between 2 and 8 May, which proved to be the last week of the war, the RAF did not permit the squadron to operate due to political considerations regarding the future status of Trieste.

During its existence, No. 351 Squadron flew 227 combat missions: 119 ground attack sorties, 87 reconnaissance missions, 19 maritime interdictions, and two search-and-rescue missions. Of the 23 pilots that passed through the squadron, four were killed and one captured. The squadron lost nine aircraft, and 38 others suffered damage, mainly from anti-aircraft fire. The squadron was released from RAF control on 16 May 1945.

=== Yugoslav Air Force ===
After the war, the Balkan Air Force's 16 surviving Hurricanes continued to be used by the Yugoslav Air Force (Serbo-Croatian: Jugoslovensko ratno vazduhoplovstvo; JRV), the air arm of Tito's new communist government. The Hurricanes flew with the 1st Fighter Regiment in 1945, followed by the Reconnaissance Aviation Regiment in 1947–1948, and the 103rd Reconnaissance Aviation Regiment between 1948 and 1951. Hurricanes remained in service with the post-war Yugoslav Air Force until the early 1950s.

== Surviving example ==
A Hawker Hurricane Mk IV that flew as part of No. 351 Squadron is on display at the Museum of Aviation in Belgrade. This aircraft, serial number 20925, was manufactured in 1943, and remained in operation until it was withdrawn from service on 18 August 1952.
