= No. 351 Squadron RAF =

No. 351 (Jugoslav) Squadron RAF
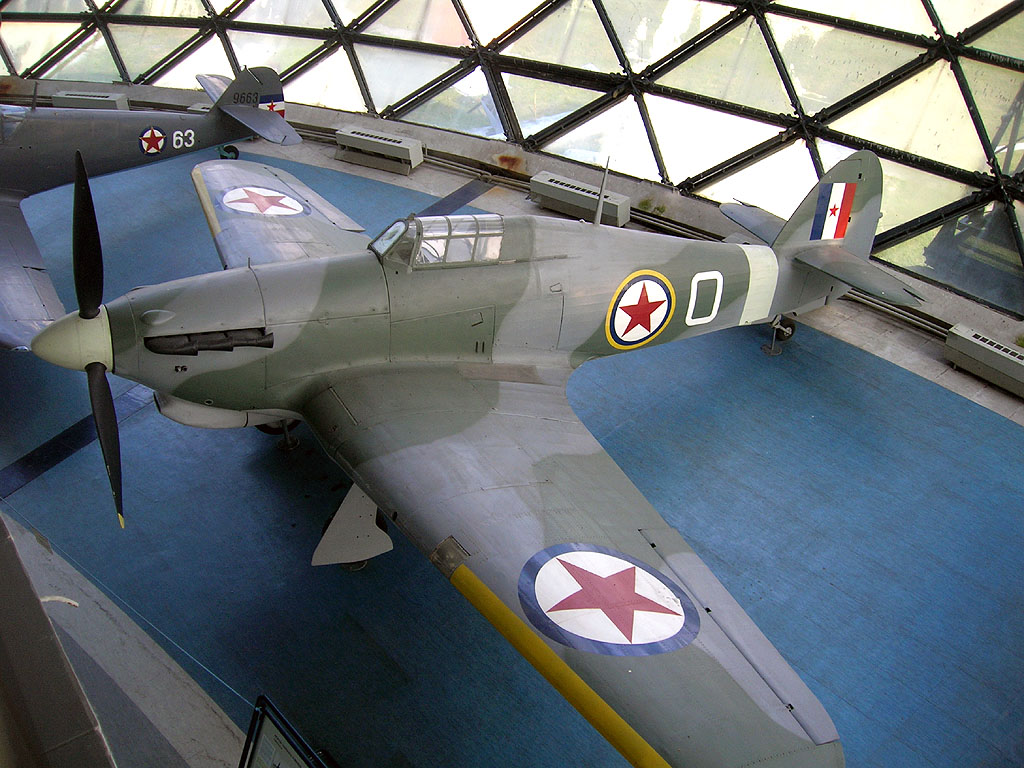
- Hawker Hurricane Mk IVRP of No. 351 Squadron RAF, Museum of Aviation in Belgrade, Belgrade, Serbia
- Active: 1 July 1944 – 15 June 1945
- Country: United Kingdom
- Allegiance: (Socialist Federal Republic of Yugoslavia) Yugoslav Partisans/People's Liberation Army of Yugoslavia
- Branch: Royal Air Force
- Role: Fighter squadron
- Part of: Balkan Air Force
- Nickname: Jugoslav
- Engagements: World War II in Yugoslavia

Aircraft flown
- Fighter: Hawker Hurricane IIC and IV

No. 351 Squadron RAF was a Yugoslav Partisan-manned fighter-bomber squadron of the Royal Air Force (RAF) which was operational between 13 October 1944 and 1 May 1945 during World War II. The squadron was also known by the Partisans as Second Squadron (NOVJ).

In mid-1944, the Yugoslav Partisans provided the personnel for the formation of two RAF squadrons, Nos. 351 and 352, which both initially operated Hurricane fighter-bombers. No. 351 Squadron flew Hurricane Mk IICs during training and was later equipped with Hurricane Mk IVs. The squadron operated as part of No. 281 Wing RAF of the Balkan Air Force, conducting ground attack missions in support of Partisan operations until the end of the war, when the squadron was transferred to the post-war Yugoslav Air Force. During its existence, No. 351 Squadron flew 227 combat missions, and of the 23 pilots that passed through the squadron, four were killed and one was captured. The squadron lost nine aircraft, and 38 others suffered damage, mainly from anti-aircraft fire.

== History ==
=== Establishment ===
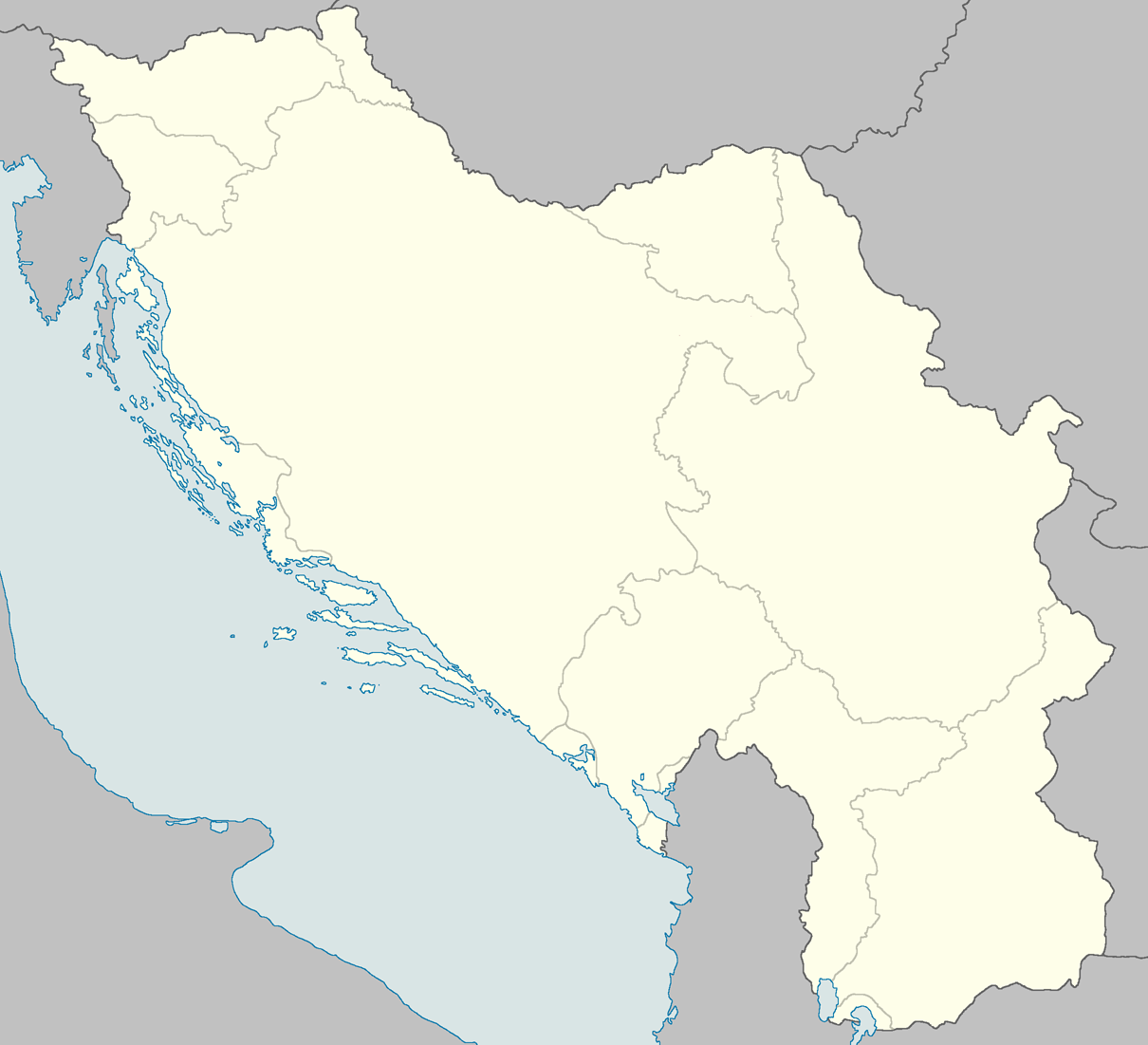
Map of Italy and occupied Yugoslavia showing the locations of the airfields at Cannae and Vis

The raising of Yugoslav Partisan-manned squadrons within the Royal Air Force (RAF) was discussed between the Partisan leader Josip Broz Tito and the head of the British mission to the Partisans, Brigadier Fitzroy Maclean, on 12 March 1944. As a result of this discussion, an agreement was concluded later that month for the RAF to train Yugoslav personnel who would man two squadrons, one of fighters and one of fighter-bombers. After completing training, these two squadrons were to conduct operations exclusively over Yugoslavia. It was agreed that the new squadrons would largely be staffed by former Royal Yugoslav Army Air Force (Serbo-Croatian Latin: Vazduhoplovstvo Vojske Kraljevine Jugoslavije, VVKJ; Serbo-Croatian Cyrillic: Ваздушно-ваздухопловне снаге Краљевине Југославије) personnel who had fled the country during the invasion and had later agreed to join the Partisans. The first squadron was raised at Benina airbase, as No. 352 (Yugoslav) Squadron RAF. Members took their Partisan oaths on 21 May 1944. Until late June, this squadron was equipped with Harvard training aircraft and Hurricane Mk IICs, which were then replaced by Supermarine Spitfire Mk Vs, which it operated until the end of the war. The Hurricane Mk IICs were handed over to a second Partisan-manned squadron, raised as No. 351 (Yugoslav) Squadron RAF, which was also established as a fighter-bomber unit in Libya on 1 July 1944.

During its work-up training, No. 351 Squadron was re-equipped with Hurricane Mk IVs. It completed training, including ground-attack practice runs, by 23 September. By 2 October, the squadron had been transferred to an airfield near Cannae in Italy to join No. 281 Wing RAF of the Balkan Air Force, a combined Allied organisation. The move was accompanied by complaints from the Partisan Supreme Headquarters that the Hurricane was inferior to the Spitfire now being flown by No. 352 Squadron, and also the Hawker Typhoon. The complaints were ignored by the RAF, and the squadron operated Hurricane Mk IVs until the end of the war, as did No. 6 Squadron RAF, a British-manned squadron that also flew missions over Yugoslavia, even though the aircraft had been taken out of frontline service in the European theatre in March 1944. No. 351 Squadron was cleared for combat operations on 13 October, and from 18 October the squadron generally had four to eight aircraft based at an airfield on the now Allied-held island of Vis in the Adriatic.

=== October–December 1944 ===
No. 351 Squadron flew its first mission on 13 October 1944; it involved six aircraft attacking an Axis supply convoy near the village of Aržano. On 20 October, aircraft from the squadron, supported by Spitfires from No. 352 Squadron, conducted rocket and strafing attacks on enemy columns near Metković that were withdrawing in the face of the advancing Partisan 26th Dalmatian Division. The mission was a success, but one aircraft was lost to ground fire.

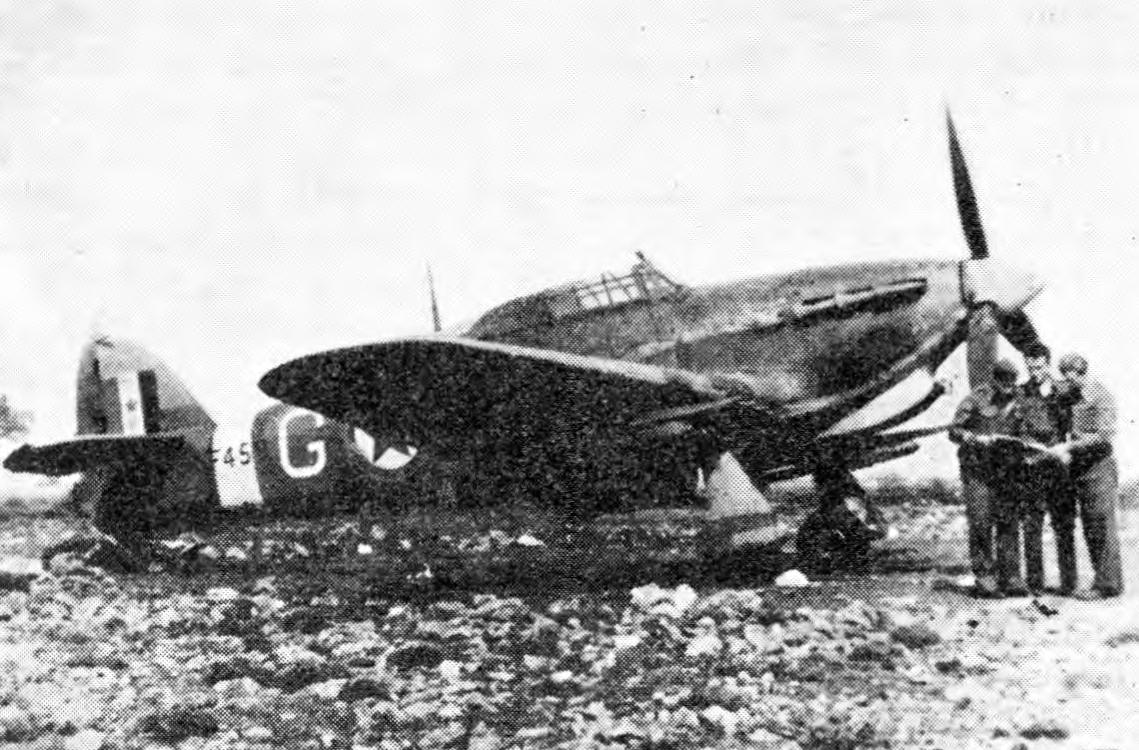
A Hurricane Mk IV of No. 351 Squadron

Nine days later, Hurricanes, escorted by a pair of Spitfires from No. 352 Squadron, flew a patrol over the island of Rab and adjacent areas of the Adriatic, but were unable to positively identify any targets. On 4 November, aircraft from No. 351 Squadron, again escorted by two Spitfires, were tasked with interdicting road communications between Bihać and Knin. One aircraft developed engine trouble and had to return to base, but the rest continued with the mission. They ran into heavy anti-aircraft fire near Knin, and one aircraft was shot down, the pilot bailing out and being captured by the Germans. The next mission, on 9 November, was hampered by extremely poor weather over the target area near Trebinje. One aircraft flew into a mountain, killing the pilot, and another suffered engine trouble and crash-landed near Trebinje, the pilot escaping unhurt.

On 3 December 1944, No. 351 Squadron carried out a successful rocket attack against Axis coastal defences on the Island of Lošinj, launching from Vis. This was followed by a period of scouting and reconnaissance over several Yugoslav regions, hitting targets of opportunity, sometimes escorted and supported by the Spitfires of No. 352 Squadron. No. 351 Squadron ranged widely, interdicting rail and road routes in eastern and western Bosnia and throughout Dalmatia, and attacking Axis maritime traffic off the Adriatic coast and islands. As the year drew to a close, operations became severely hampered by the worsening weather.

=== January–March 1945 ===
In January and February 1945, much better co-ordination was achieved between the two Yugoslav RAF squadrons and Partisan ground and maritime forces. This was done through the deployment of aviation liaison sections with the main Partisan formations, initially with the 8th Corps and then also the 5th Corps. On 4 January, four Hurricanes flew from Vis to attack an enemy convoy travelling between Mostar and Sarajevo. The convoy was located near Jablanica and seven trucks were destroyed. The aircraft went on to attack the railway station in Jablanica, damaging one locomotive and ten wagons. One Hurricane was damaged by anti-aircraft fire during the mission. On 22 January, Hurricanes escorted by Spitfires attacked a ship of 1,000 tonnes (980 long tons) off the island of Rab, firing sixteen rockets. Due to the minimal Luftwaffe presence over much of Yugoslavia, in many cases the Spitfire escorts from No. 352 Squadron were not needed to protect against enemy aircraft, so they also engaged ground and maritime targets alongside the Hurricanes of No. 351 Squadron.

In February, both squadrons provided support for the liberation of major towns, including Široki Brijeg, Nevesinje and Mostar, and patrolled and attacked targets of opportunity across Bosnia and Dalmatia. Specifically, they supported the Mostar operation of the 8th Corps, the work of the 11th Corps clearing the enemy from islands in the northern Adriatic, and also 5th Corps operations. Despite the presence of liaison sections with ground forces, procedures were not yet streamlined, and several friendly fire incidents occurred during the Mostar operation. In support of 11th Corps operations, Hurricanes attacked German headquarters, defences and naval traffic on and around the islands of Pag and Krk. On 7 February, Hurricanes of No. 351 Squadron were supporting 4th and 11th Corps and attacked a column of German trucks and wagons on the road between Gospić and Bihać when two of the aircraft collided, causing minor damage. Both aircraft crash-landed in friendly territory and were written off, but the pilots escaped unharmed. During February, No. 351 Squadron re-deployed to Zemunik on the mainland near Zadar.

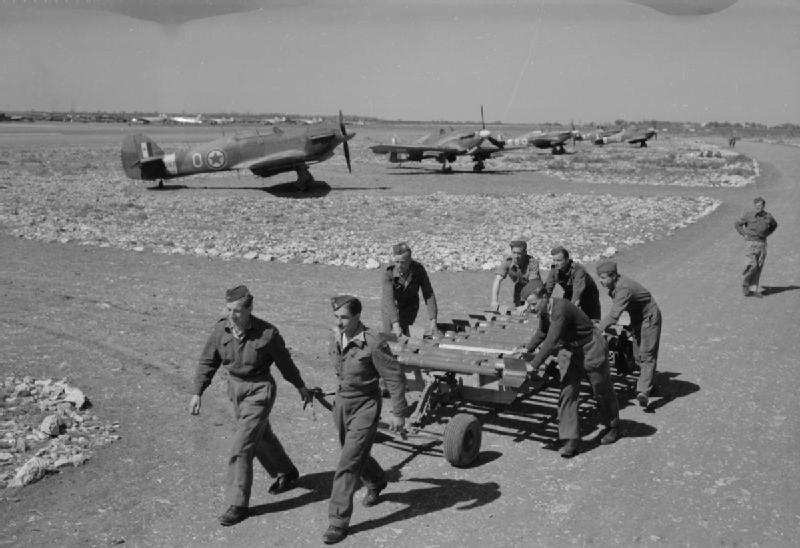
Partisan ground crews preparing to load RP-3 rockets onto the Hurricanes of No. 351 Squadron RAF at Prkos airfield

In early March, the formation of the 4th Army was accompanied by the development of even closer coordination and liaison with the two squadrons. Air marker panels began to be used to show the forward line of friendly troops and to identify friendly vehicles, and liaison teams were deployed with the commanders of lower-level formations to communicate directly with supporting aircraft. Operations continued across Bosnia and Dalmatia in March, and were extended to include support to advances in the Lika region and during the capture of Sarajevo and Bihać. As Axis forces withdrew west towards Zagreb, the Hurricanes of No. 351 Squadron continued to harry them, ambushing convoys and rocketing artillery positions. Between 1 January and 31 March 1945, the Hurricanes of No. 351 Squadron not only flew from Cannae and Vis, but also from the airfields at Zemunik and Prkos on the mainland. In the same period the squadron lost four aircraft and suffered damage to fifteen others. Of the lost aircraft, two were destroyed as a result of a collision, one was lost after engine failure, and only one was lost to anti-aircraft fire. Four aircraft were damaged by anti-aircraft fire, the remainder being damaged by fragments from their own rockets.

=== April–May 1945 ===
From the beginning of April 1945, the combat operations of No. 351 Squadron were focussed on supporting the offensives by the 4th Army in the Lika and Gorski kotar regions, along the Croatian coastline and in Istria. In particular, there was hard fighting in the islands of the northern Adriatic. On 5 April, one Hurricane was lost near Babin Potok when it flew into a mountain while supporting the 19th Dalmatian Division's attack on elements of the 11th Ustaše Division, resulting in the death of the pilot. During this period, all operations of No. 351 Squadron were carried out from the airfield at Zemunik. Two aircraft were destroyed and eighteen damaged. Between 2 and 8 May, which proved to be the last week of the war, the RAF did not permit the squadron to operate due to political considerations regarding the future status of Trieste.

During its existence, No. 351 Squadron flew 227 combat missions: 119 ground attack sorties, 87 reconnaissance missions, 19 maritime interdictions, and two search-and-rescue missions. Of the 23 pilots that passed through the squadron, four were killed and one captured. The squadron lost nine aircraft, and 38 others suffered damage, mainly from anti-aircraft fire. The squadron was released from RAF control on 16 May 1945.

=== Yugoslav Air Force ===
After the war, the Balkan Air Force's 16 surviving Hurricanes continued to be used by the Yugoslav Air Force (Serbo-Croatian: Jugoslovensko ratno vazduhoplovstvo; JRV), the air arm of Tito's new communist government. The Hurricanes flew with the 1st Fighter Regiment in 1945, followed by the Reconnaissance Aviation Regiment in 1947–1948, and the 103rd Reconnaissance Aviation Regiment between 1948 and 1951. Hurricanes remained in service with the post-war Yugoslav Air Force until the early 1950s.

A Hawker Hurricane Mk IV that flew as part of No. 351 Squadron is on display at the Museum of Aviation in Belgrade. This aircraft, serial number 20925, was manufactured in 1943, and remained in operation until it was withdrawn from service on 18 August 1952.

== Aircraft operated ==
From	To	Aircraft	Variant
July 1944	September 1944	Hawker Hurricane	IIC
September 1944	June 1945	Hawker Hurricane	IV

== See also ==
- Hawker Hurricane in Yugoslav service
