= Orahovo =

Orahovo may refer to:

Bosnia and Herzegovina

- Orahovo (Breza)
- Orahovo, Foča
- Pobrđe Orahovo, in Kiseljak
- Orahovo, Travnik

Montenegro

- Orahovo, Bar, a village
- Orahovo, Petnjica
- Orahovo Monastery in Bar

Serbia

- Orahovo (Raška)

Kosovo

- Rahovë, Mitrovica, a village
