= Lika-Primorje operation =

- Part of World War II in Yugoslavia
Date	20 March – 15 April 1945
Location	Lika and Western Bosnia
Result	Yugoslav Army victory: Destruction of German XV Mountain Corps

Belligerents
Yugoslav Partisans	Germany; Independent State of Croatia

Commanders and leaders
(Yugoslav Partisans) Petar Drapšin (Yugoslav Partisans) Pavle Jakšić (Yugoslav Partisans) Boško Šiljegović	(Nazi Germany) Gustav Fehn †

Units involved
(Yugoslav Partisans) 4th Army: (Yugoslav Partisans) 9th Division; (Yugoslav Partisans) 19th Division; (Yugoslav Partisans) 20th Division; (Yugoslav Partisans) 26th Division; (Yugoslav Partisans) 7th Division	(Nazi Germany) XV Mountain Corps: (Nazi Germany) 392nd Division; (Nazi Germany) 373rd Division; (Independent State of Croatia) 10th Division; (Independent State of Croatia) 11th Division

Strength
70,000	40,000

Casualties and losses
	First phase: 5,616 killed, 6,949 wounded and 2,905 wounded

Lika-Primorje operation was a military operation carried out by the Yugoslav Partisan 4th Army against Wehrmacht units and the Croatian Armed Forces. It was conducted in the area of Lika and Western Bosnia from 20 March to 15 April 1945.

In the first phase, the 4th Army took eastern Lika and Bihać, and in the second it took Gospić, Perušić, Lički Osik and Otočac. After 7 April 1945, units of the 4th Army continued the movement towards Rijeka.

== See also ==
- Knin operation
- Sarajevo Operation
- Mostar operation
- Trieste operation
