= Arkadije Popov =

Yugoslav pilot in WWII

- Аркадий Иванович Попов
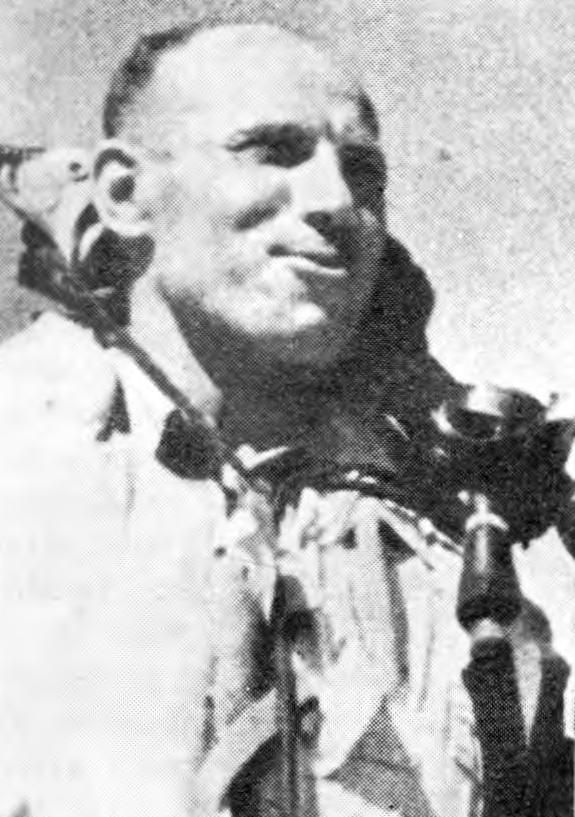
- Major Arkadije Popov, circa 1944
- Born: 17 November 1906; Krasnodar, Russian Empire
- Died: 16 October 1944 (aged 37) near Ston (islet Bogutovac) Yugoslavia, now Croatia
- Education: Naval Academy in Dubrovnik
- Military career
- Allegiance: Yugoslav Partisans
- Branch: RAF
- Service years: 1943-1944
- Rank: Major
- Nickname: Arkaška
- Unit: 352 squadron RAF (Yugoslav)
- Commands: "B" flight
- Conflicts: Adriatic campaign of World War II
- Awards: Order of the Partisan Star (2nd class)

Arkadije Popov (Russian: Аркадий Иванович Попов; 17 November 1906 – 16 October 1944) was a Yugoslav pilot of Russian descent.

== Early life and service ==
Born in Russia to a Don cossack family, Popov emigrated with his parents to the Kingdom of Serbs, Croats and Slovenes following the bolshevik revolution. He learned to fly and was a pilot of the naval aviation of the Royal Yugoslav Air Force at the start of WWII in 1941. He first fled to Greece, but was captured by German forces during operation Marita. Following his capture he joined the NDH air force. During this time he displayed a nonchalantly anti-fascist attitude, greeting his comrades with the phrase “Za slom spremni” (Croatian: For collapse - ready!) In late 1943, being hounded by the Gestapo, Popov managed to get a hold of a Breguet XIX and fly over to the allies in Italy.

== Allied service ==
In April 1944, Popov joined the newly formed 352 Squadron at the first Partisan air base in Benina, Libya where he was made commander of Flight B with the rank of major. On August 16 the squadron was stationed at full combat readiness in Cannae, as part of the No. 281 Wing of the Balkan Air Force. In spite of his ancestry, Popov was remembered first and foremost as a Yugoslav patriot who, nevertheless, maintained a fondness for Russia. According to Pejčić, upon greeting a group of Red Army pilots in Bari, they refused to speak with him on account of his white émigré background. In September 1944 Popov impressed an allied officer by performing four strafing runs on a well defended enemy column on the Gospić–Otočac road.

== Death ==
Popov was killed in action on the 16th of October by anti-aircraft fire over the islet Bogutovac near Doli, Croatia (Note: Often incorrectly cited as Slano) while on a combat air patrol of the Dubrovnik–Metković road. He was the sixth pilot of his squadron to be shot down and was memorialised by a monument consisting of a single bronze wing on the mainland near his crash site. The monument was removed in the 1990s.

== See also ==
- 352 Squadron RAF (Yugoslav)
- Adriatic campaign of World War II
- Balkan Air Force
