= Franjo Kluz =

Yugoslav partisan

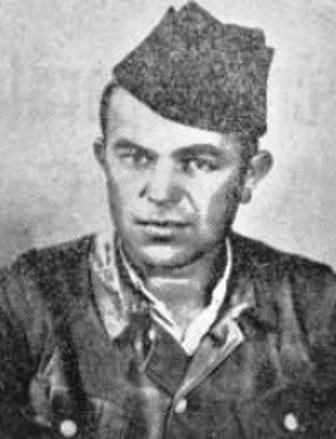
- Franjo Kluz
- Born: 19 September 1913; Jošik, Bosanska Dubica, Austria-Hungary
- Died: 14 September 1944 (aged 30); Omiš, Independent State of Croatia
- Known for: Being one of the first pilots of the Yugoslav Partisan Air Force
- Aviation career
- Air force: (Kingdom of Yugoslavia) Royal Yugoslav Air Force; Air Force of the Independent State of Croatia (Socialist Federal Republic of Yugoslavia) Yugoslav Partisans (United Kingdom) Royal Air Force
- Rank: Pilot Officer

Franjo Kluz (19 September 1913 – 14 September 1944) was a Yugoslav pilot from Bosnia and a People's Hero of Yugoslavia. He is best known as one of the founders of the Partisan air force, and served as an officer in No. 352 Squadron RAF.

== Early life and career ==
Franjo Kluz was born in Jošik, near Bosanska Dubica. In 1931 he graduated from the Yugoslav reserve officers school as a sergeant-pilot. After the Axis invasion and establishment of Independent State of Croatia in 1941 he was drafted into the Air Force of the Independent State of Croatia and was stationed in Banja Luka.

In the second half of May 1942, like Rudi Čajavec before him, he defected to the Partisans with his Potez 25 aircraft. From the improvised airfield near Prijedor he carried out a number of sorties against Axis forces, the most notable being the attack on an Ustaša column near Orahovo on 4 June. His plane was destroyed by hostile fire on 6 July.

He then became a member of the Partisan command for Bosanska Krajina region. As a member of the command staff, he was required to be a Party member and on 14 August 1942 he was accepted as a member of the Communist Party of Yugoslavia.

On 14 October Kluz became the station commander of the First Air Base of the Yugoslav National Liberation Army (YNLA) in Livno. After the German offensive, Kluz was sent, with 200 men, to Allied-controlled Italy, where they received training, equipment and aircraft from the RAF. Kluz was commissioned as a Pilot Officer in the RAFVR, with the service number 178171.

Kluz became a member of the 1st Air Squadron of YNLA (Prva eskadrila, NOVJ), otherwise known as No. 352 Squadron RAF. On 14 September 1944, he was shot down in his Spitfire and killed by German AAA over Omiš. For his wartime service, Franjo Kluz was posthumously awarded the Order of a People's Hero of Yugoslavia.

== Legacy ==
A clothing factory in Belgrade was named in his honour. The company Kluz padobrani makes parachutes to this day.

A printing company in Omiš is also named after Kluz. An aero club in Zemun is also named in his honour. Streets in Skopje and in Novi Sad are also named after Kluz. The Franjo Kluz Elementary School also existed in the Koševsko brdo neighbourhood of Sarajevo (since renamed Mehmed-beg Kapetanović Ljubušak elementary school).In the neighbourhoods of Briješće and Naselje Heroja Sokolje, near Rajlovac in Sarajevo there is a street named after Franjo Kluz.
