= Petar Drapšin =

Yugoslav Partisan commander

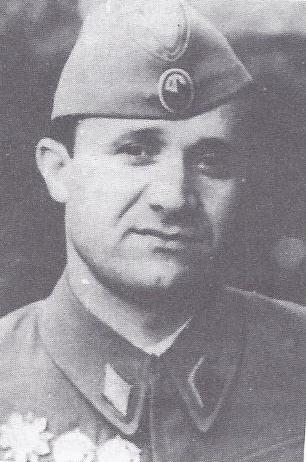
- Born: 15 November 1914; Turija, Austria-Hungary
- Died: 2 November 1945 (aged 30); Belgrade, Serbia, DF Yugoslavia
- Military career
- Allegiance: Second Spanish Republic; Yugoslavia
- Branch: International Brigades; Yugoslav People's Army
- Service years: 1937–1939; 1941–1945
- Rank: Lieutenant General
- Commands: 12th Slavonian Division; 6th Corps; 8th Corps; 4th Army
- Conflicts: Spanish Civil War; World War II
- Awards: Order of the People's Hero

Petar Drapšin (Serbian Cyrillic: Петар Драпшин; 15 November 1914 – 2 November 1945) was a Serbian and Yugoslav Partisan commander.

== Early life and education ==
Drapšin was born to a family of poor peasant farmers in the village of Turija near Srbobran (Szenttamás), Austria-Hungary a few months into World War I. By the time he reached school age, the war ended, resulting in the Austro-Hungarian defeat and disintegration along with formation of a new state Kingdom of Serbs, Croats and Slovenes.

He completed primary school in his village before going to nearby Srbobran for lower gymnasium studies.

He then moved to the country's capital Belgrade, apprenticing for a tradesman position. After completing his trade term, he enrolled in the streamlined technical high school where he first got introduced to the workers' movement ideas under the auspices of the Communist Party (KPJ), a political organization banned in the Kingdom of Yugoslavia. Active in the school's literary section that actively spread communist ideas, Drapšin also joined KPJ's youth wing SKOJ.

In 1937 he went to Prague for university studies.

Soon after that, he went to fight in the Spanish Civil War, joining the Republican side as one of the Yugoslav volunteers in the Spanish Civil War. He excelled in combat, earning the rank of captain in the process. After the demise of Second Spanish Republic, he was interned in France. From there he escaped to Zagreb in 1939.

== World War II ==
In 1941, following the Axis invasion of Yugoslavia, Drapšin was given the task of organizing armed uprising in the Herzegovina region by the Yugoslav Communist Party (KPJ). His hardline approach resulted in him over-reaching his task by dealing ruthlessly with civilians who did not subscribe to his revolutionary zealousness. This led to widespread accounts among the Partisans of his excesses. These included that in spring 1942 his men executed sixty villagers, and then danced around their corpses, in front of the relatives of the dead. This was done to remind the local population of the absolute power of the Partisans. Drapšin was sanctioned by KPJ headquarters for these actions, but his combat skills led to a series of promotions. In January 1943, he was appointed as the commander of Yugoslav National Liberation Army's (YNLA) 12th Slavonian Division. Two months later he received the rank of major general. In May 1944 he became commander of YNLA's 8th Corps. During summer 1944, Drapšin became deputy commander of the Croatian National Liberation Army (NOVH), the Croatian branch of YNLA.

In December 1944 Drapšin was sent to Dalmatia to command YNLA's 8th Corps. In January 1945 he received the rank of lieutenant general. Units under his command halted German offensive in Dalmatian hinterland in January 1945 and liberated Herzegovina during the Mostar Operation.

Soon after that the 8th Corps got transformed into the 4th Army, which began the Lika-Primorje operation, an offensive against the remaining Axis forces in Yugoslavia in late March 1945. Despite difficult terrain and need for complicated amphibious operation, Drapšin's force scored spectacular success by piercing through enemy lines in Lika, defeating German forces in the Rijeka operation, landing in Istria and entering Trieste before Allied forces. This Partisan offensive was arguably the most important in the history of Yugoslavia, because it allowed Istria, Rijeka and Slovene Littoral to become part of SFR Yugoslavia, later Croatia and Slovenia.

After the war Drapšin was entered as candidate for the National Assembly at the post-war elections.

=== Death ===
Details surrounding Drapšin's death are uncertain. There are contradictory accounts about his death on 2 November 1945. The official version attributes the cause of death to an accidentally discharged pistol. Other stories tell about Drapšin being criticised at a party meeting and committing suicide afterwards.

The author and former Partisan Sava Skoko described Drapšin as a "psychologically unstable person whose condition bordered on complete insanity". Skoko also disputes the official communist version of Drapšin's death and claims that he committed suicide.

In 1953, he posthumously received the honour of the People's Hero of Yugoslavia.

== See also ==
- Yugoslav volunteers in the Spanish Civil War
