= No. 352 Squadron RAF =

Yugoslav squadron of the Royal Air Force

No. 352 (Jugoslav) Squadron RAF
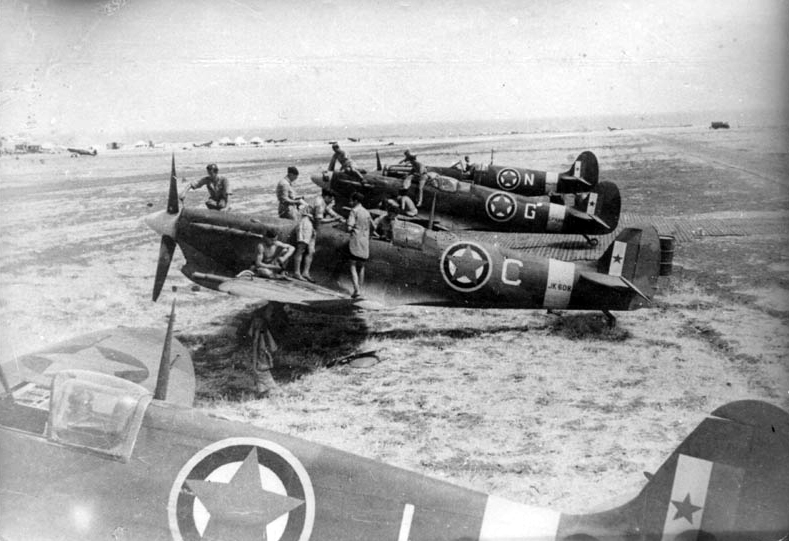
- No. 352 Squadron Spitfire VB's before first mission on 18 August 1944, from Canne airfield, Italy.
- Active: 22 April 1944 – 15 June 1945
- Country: United Kingdom
- Allegiance: (Socialist Federal Republic of Yugoslavia) Yugoslavia
- Branch: Royal Air Force
- Role: Fighter Squadron
- Part of: Balkan Air Force
- Nickname: Jugoslav
- Engagements: World War II in Yugoslavia

No. 352 Squadron RAF was a Yugoslav-manned fighter-bomber squadron of the Royal Air Force during the Second World War. The squadron was also known as First Yugoslav Squadron.

== History ==
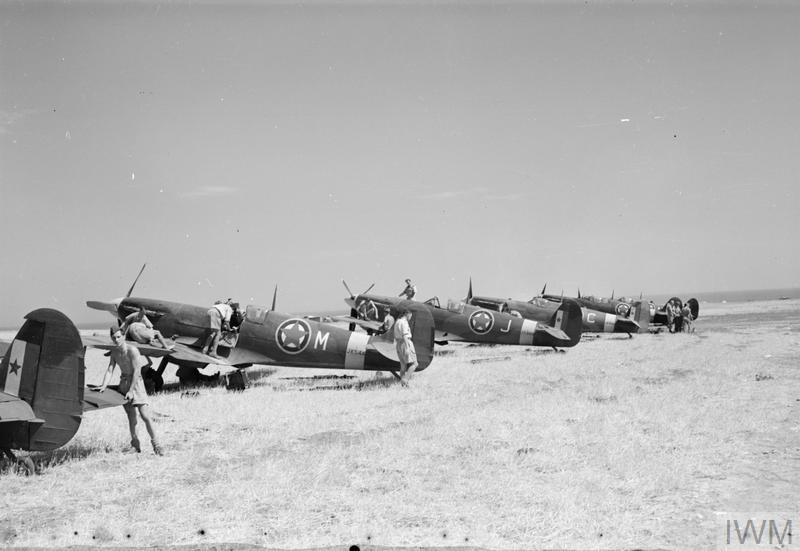
Supermarine Spitfire Mark VCs of No. 352 Squadron, the first operational Yugoslav unit to be formed in the RAF, being prepared at Canne, Italy, for their first operation, escorting a fighter-bomber attack on targets in Yugoslavia.

Formed at Benina, Libya on 22 April 1944, the squadron was the first Yugoslav-manned fighter unit to be formed in the Mediterranean. Equipped with Hurricanes initially, it received Supermarine Spitfires in June and in August moved to Italy to join No.281 Wing RAF. The squadron provided escort for fighter-bomber squadrons and engaged in ground attack missions for the rest of the war, using the island of Vis as an advanced base until 1 January 1945, when the squadron's air echelon became permanently based there.

The squadron was organized by the war formation prescribed for RAF mobile fighter squadrons, having two flights with eight Supermarine Spitfires in each flight. The flying and technical staff were composed of personnel from the Royal Yugoslav Air Force moved to NOVJ, and staff from the First Air Base NOVJ.

The squadron carried out its first operational mission on 18 August 1944.

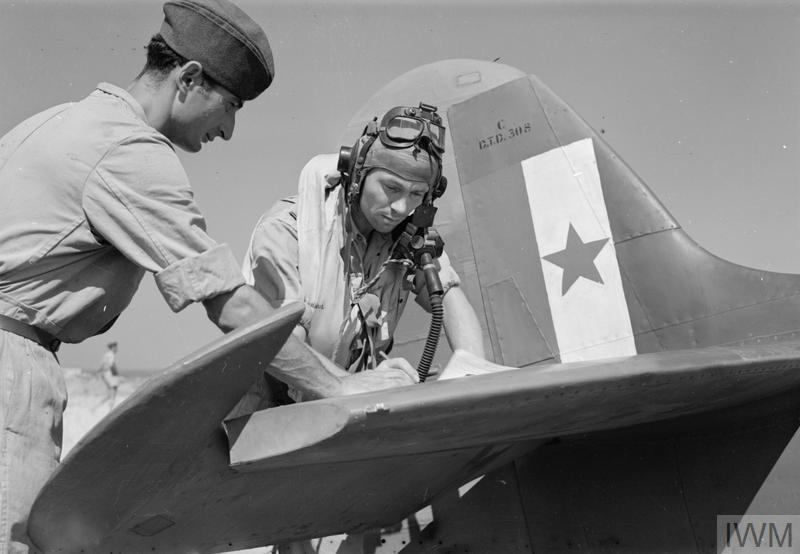
Watched by his rigger (left), a pilot of No. 352 Squadron, signs the aircraft serviceability form for his Supermarine Spitfire Mark VC on the tailplane of the aircraft, before taking off on the unit's first operation. Note the Yugoslav national marking, consisting of a red star superimposed on the white portion of RAF tail stripe.

The first squadron commander was Captain Mileta Protić, and the political commissar was Franjo Kluz, commander of "A" flight was Captain Ratko Jovanović, and commander of "B" flight was Captain Arkadije Popov. All three of these men were killed by the end of the year: an indication of the intensity of the fighting in the ground-support operations at the time. Protić and Popov are commemorated on the CWGC memorial in Malta, and Jovanovic in the CWGC cemetery at Belgrade.

Hinko Šoić took over as Squadron Commander and the new Flight commanders were Branko Kraus and Đuro Ivanšević. Ivanšević survived the war and became the Regimental Commander of the short-lived 1st Fighter Regiment, the amalgamation of the two RAF-trained squadrons.

During the war, 27 pilots became casualties, of whom 10 were killed, including the Squadron Commander and both Flight Commanders, and Franjo Kluz, first partisan pilot and national hero of Yugoslavia.

Through the nine months of the war, No. 352 Squadron RAF carried out 367 combat operations with 1210 take offs. These tasks include supporting troops in Yugoslavia, fighter protection and reconnaissance. The squadron used Canne, Vis and Zemunik airbases.

Headquarters remained in Italy until it was moved to the Yugoslav mainland to join its air echelon in April 1945 and the squadron disbanded from the RAF on 16 May 1945. On 18 May 1945, together with No. 351 Squadron it formed 1st Fighter Regiment of SFR Yugoslav Air Force.

== Aircraft operated ==
From	To	Aircraft	Variant	Notes
April 1944	June 1944	Hawker Hurricane	IIC	
June 1944	August 1944	Supermarine Spitfire	VB	
June 1944	June 1945	Supermarine Spitfire	VC	
? 1944	June 1945	Supermarine Spitfire	IX	

== See also ==
- No. 351 Squadron RAF (also Yugoslav-manned)
- Hawker Hurricane in Yugoslav service
