= 12th Division (Yugoslav Partisans) =

12th Slavonia Assault Division
- Flag of Democratic Federal Yugoslavia (used by the Partisans)
- Active: 1942–1945
- Country: Democratic Federal Yugoslavia
- Branch: Yugoslav Partisan Army
- Type: Infantry
- Size: ~2,700 (upon formation)
- Part of: 6th Corps
- Engagements: World War II in Yugoslavia

Commanders
- Notable commanders: Nikola Demonja †; Milan Stanivuković †; Petar Drapšin

The 12th Slavonia Assault Division (Note: At the time of formation, it was known as "4th Division of Main Staff of the National Liberation Army and Partisan Detachments of Croatia") (Serbo-Croatian Latin: Dvanaesta slavonska udarna divizija) was a Yugoslav Partisan division formed on 30 December 1942. Upon formation it consisted of the 12th Slavonia Brigade, the 16th Youth Brigade and the 17th Slavonia Brigade with total of around 2700 soldiers. On 17 May 1943 it became a part of the 6th Corps. It operated mostly in the Slavonia region. During the war the division lost two if its commanders: Nikola Demonja and Milan Stanivuković.
