= Jošik =

- Village
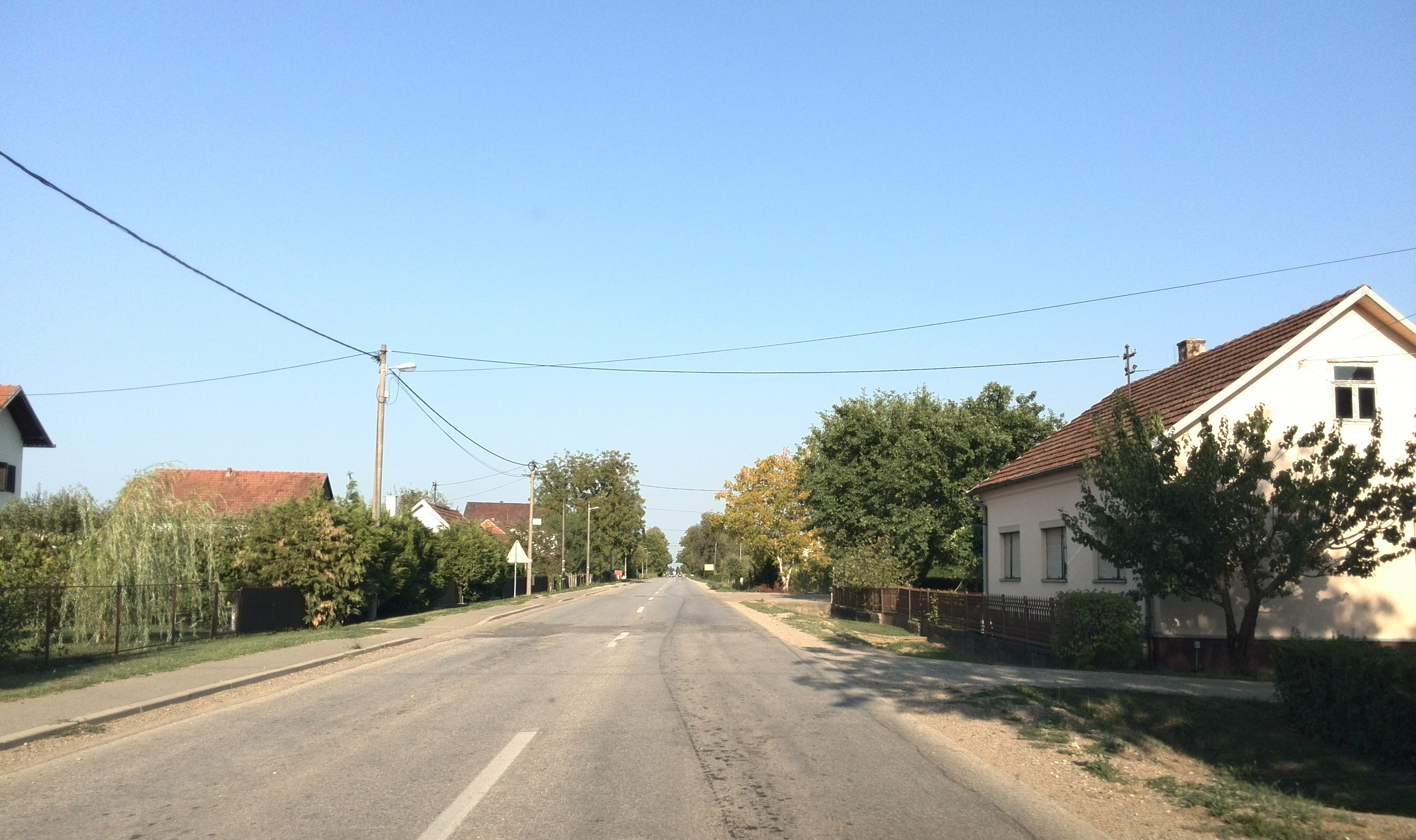

- Location within Bosnia and Herzegovina
- Coordinates: 45.201429°N 16.858694°E
- Country: Bosnia and Herzegovina
- Entity: Republika Srpska
- Municipality: Kozarska Dubica

Population (1991)
  - Total: 646
- Time zone: UTC+1 (CET)
  - Summer (DST): UTC+2 (CEST)

Jošik (Serbian Cyrillic: Јошик) is a village in the municipality of Kozarska Dubica, Republika Srpska, Bosnia and Herzegovina.

== Notable residents ==
- Franjo Kluz
