= 4th Army (Yugoslav Partisans) =

- Active: 1 March 1945
- Country: (Democratic Federal Yugoslavia) Yugoslavia
- Branch: Yugoslav Partisans
- Type: Field Army
- Engagements: World War II: Lika-Primorje operation; Rijeka operation; Trieste operation

Commanders
- Notable commanders: General Lieutenant Petar Drapšin

The 4th Army of the Yugoslav Partisans was a Partisan army that operated in Yugoslavia during the last months of the Second World War.

The Army was created on 1 March 1945, when Chief Commander Marshal Josip Broz Tito converted the underground National Liberation Army and Partisan Detachments of Yugoslavia in the more regular Yugoslav Army.

== History ==
As commander was named General lieutenant Petar Drapšin, as Political Commissioner Colonel Boško Šiljegović, and as Chief of staff, Colonel Pavle Jakšić. The Army was formed from the divisions of the 7th Corps (14th and 18th), 8th Corps (9th, 19th, 20th and 26th Dalmatian), 11th Corps (13th, 35th and 43rd) and later also the 9th Corps (30th and 31st). In addition the 4th Army had an Artillery, 1st Tank, Engineer and Replacement Brigade, a Motorized Artillery Battalion and a liaison regiment.

Three major operations were carried out in the Liberation of Yugoslavia: the Lika-Primorje operation (March 20 – 15 April 1945), the Rijeka operation (April 16 – 7 May) and the Trieste operation (April 29 – 3 May). They destroyed the German XV Mountain Corps, surrounded the LXXXXVII Army Corps and liberated Lika, Hrvatsko Primorje including Rijeka, Gorski Kotar, Istria, part of the Slovenian littoral and Trieste with its surroundings.
Her motorized units even advanced into central Carinthia. The 29th Division also participated in the liberation of the area between Postojna and Ljubljana.

== Composition ==
According to Vladimir Dedijer IV Army in its composition have 40,500 Croats, 31,500 Serbs and 18,000 Slovenes.

== Sources ==
- This is a translation of the article in the Slovenian Wikipedia, 4. armada (NOVJ).
- Researchgate
- Media related to 4th Army (Partisans) at Wikimedia Commons
