= Orahovo (Raška) =

Coordinates: 43.2181°N 20.6039°E

- Village (Selo)
- Interactive map of Orahovo
- Country: Serbia
- District: Raška District
- Municipality: Raška

Population (2002)
  - Total: 34
- Time zone: UTC+1 (CET)
  - Summer (DST): UTC+2 (CEST)

Orahovo is a village in the municipality of Raška, Serbia. According to the 2002 census, the village has a population of 34 people.
