= Mostar operation =

1945 battle

Mostar Operation
- Part of World War II in Yugoslavia
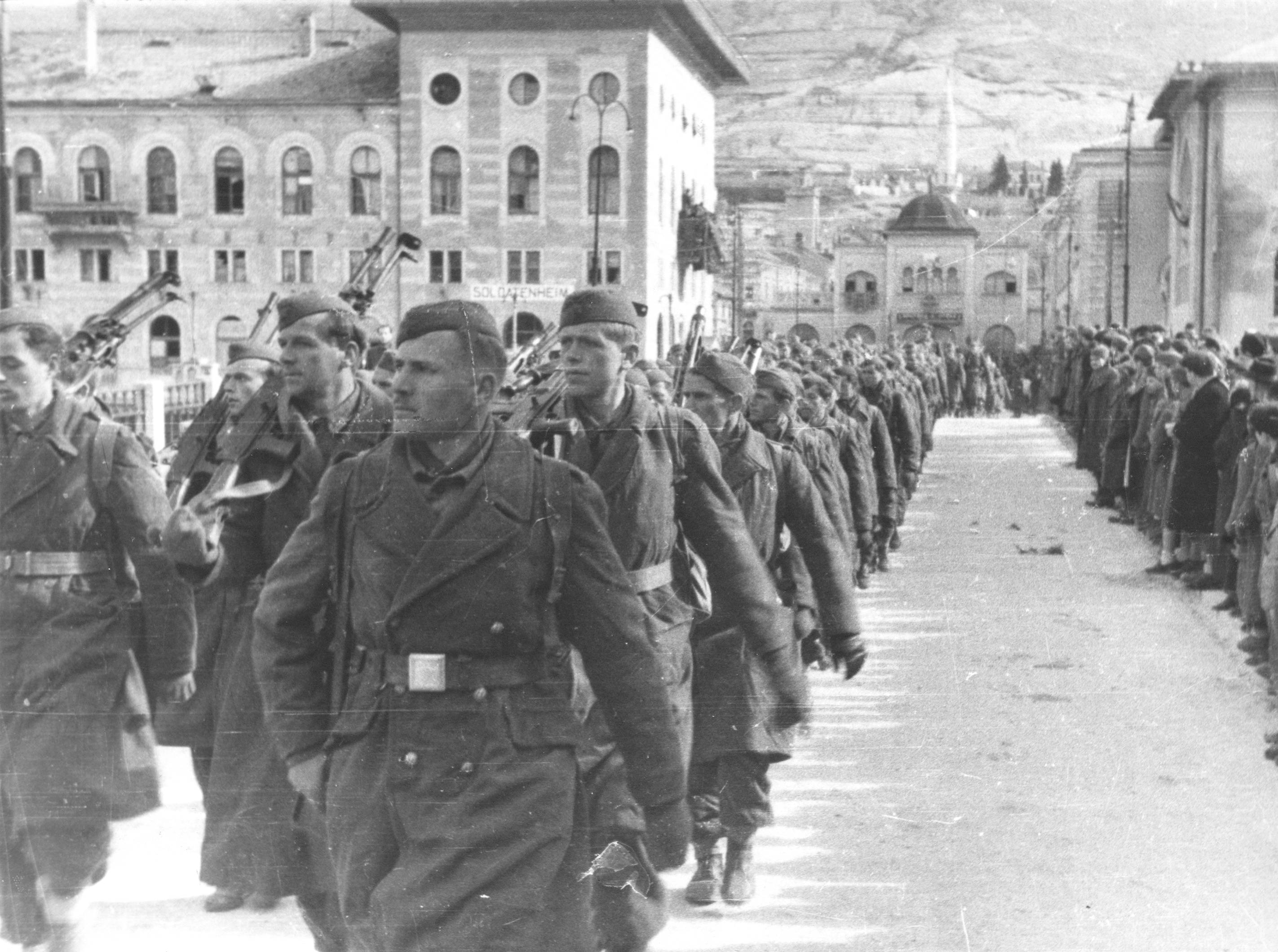
- 8th Yugoslav Partisans' Corps in liberated Mostar, February 1945
Date	February 6–15, 1945
Location	Mostar, Herzegovina 43°20′N 17°48′E
Result	Partisan victory

Belligerents
Yugoslav Partisans	Germany; Independent State of Croatia; Chetniks

Commanders and leaders
(Yugoslav Partisans) Petar Drapšin	(Nazi Germany) Georg Reinicke

Strength
32,800 men	15,000 men

Casualties and losses
515 killed 336 missing 1,600 wounded	Several thousand killed, wounded or captured

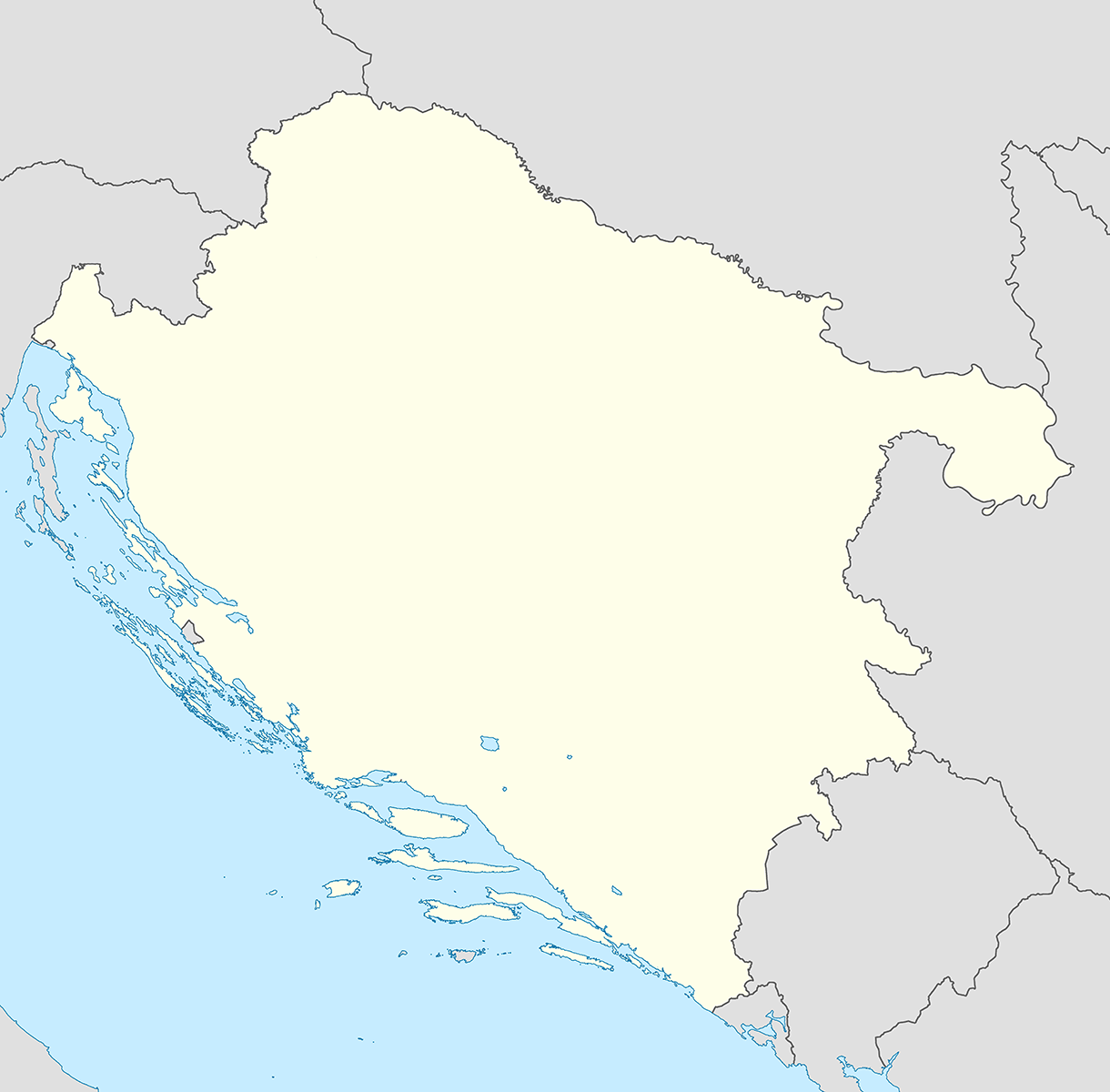
Location of Mostar within the Independent State of Croatia

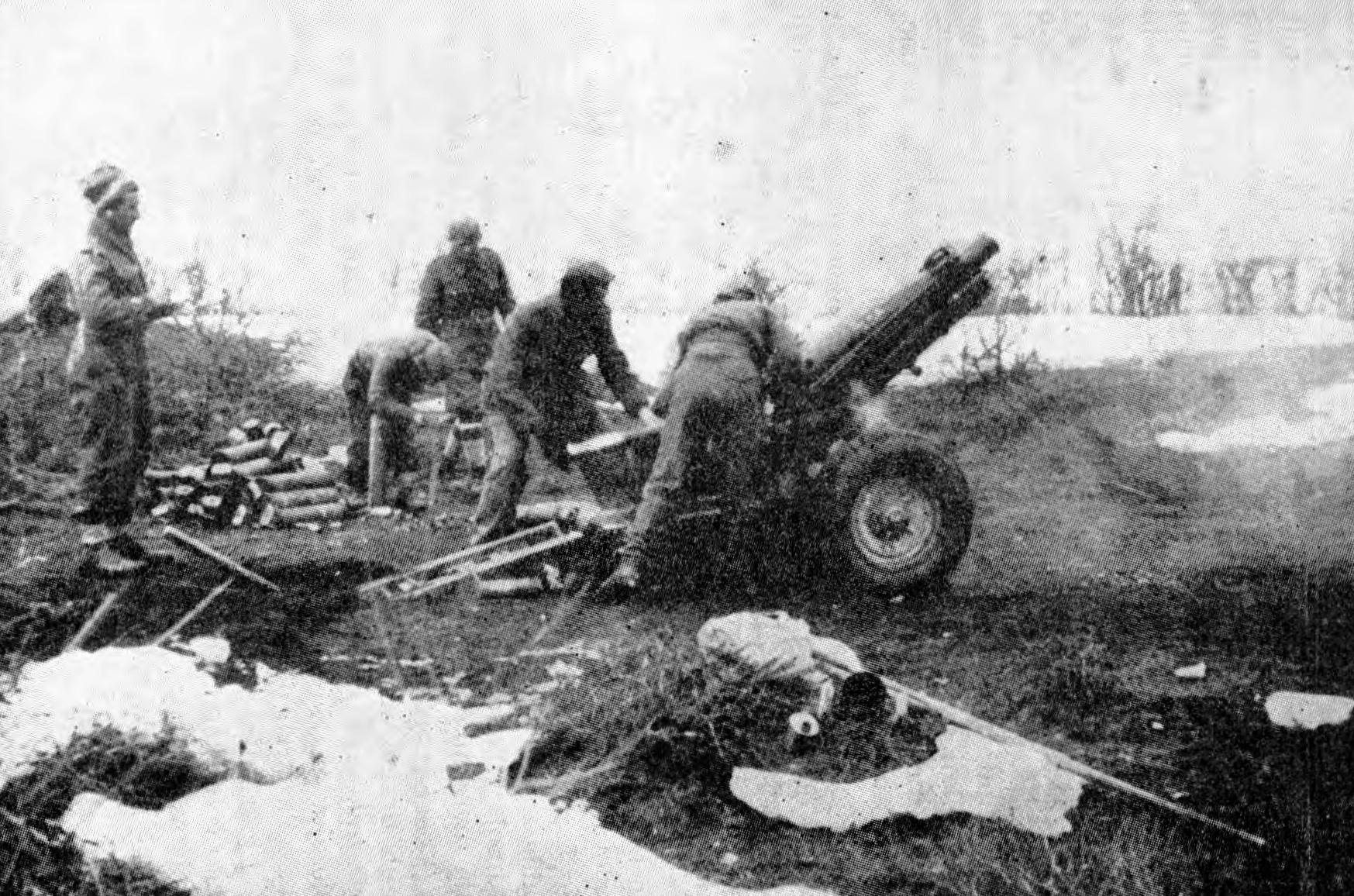
Partisan howitzer during Mostar operation

The Mostar Operation was a series of Yugoslav Partisan military operations in Herzegovina from February 6–15, 1945.

== The Battle ==
Most of central Herzegovina was part of the District of Hum in the Independent State of Croatia. Mostar was also home to an air field of the Air Force of the Independent State of Croatia.

The Partisans took the Ustaše bastion of Široki Brijeg from the Germans and Croats on February 7.
After the loss of Široki Brijeg, the German line was reduced to the immediate defense of the city of Mostar from the west and south. The 370th Infantry Regiment with parts of the 369th Panzerjäger Abteilung Armored Battalion occupied infantry positions west of the city, and artillery position was established on the Varda Hill five kilometers south of the city. The area between these positions was filled with elements of the NDH Ninth Mountain Division. In these positions for five days, variable fights were conducted with a large number of limited penetrations and counterattacks.

The headquarters of the Partisan Eighth Corps issued an order on February 12 to direct an all-out attack on Mostar. According to the command, the 29th Division was to liberate Nevesinje and close the hoop around Mostar on the east and northeast sides, the 19th division was to break the resistance from the south, the 26th division from the west and the 9th Division form the north, cutting off the escape route towards Sarajevo. The focus of the attack was on the action of the 26th Division.

The attack began Feb. 13 at 7 p.m. Units from the 9th, 19th and 26th divisions advanced systematically, breaking the persistent resistance of the Germans and Croats and destroying the resistance points one by one. The Germans and Croats suffered great losses. In addition to numerous soldiers, the commander of the 2nd Battalion of the 370th Regiment, Captain Hampel, was killed. He was replaced by Lieutenant Mattiba, who was also killed. The Partisans captured the Chetnik stronghold of Nevesinje on the night of February 13/14.

On February 14, the fighting moved into the city itself. During his occupation of the western part of the city, the commander of the 370th Regiment, Major Becker, was also killed. During the afternoon, the Germans were evicted from the western part of the city, retaining only the easternmost part of the bridge in order to allow troops from Nevesinje, Buna and Blagaj to retreat. Attacks by the First, Sixth and Eleventh Dalmatian Brigades at 6 pm, liquidated this bridgehead, and attempts to demolish the Neretva bridges were prevented. In doing so, Mostar was liberated.

=== Executions ===
Upon entering the city, the Partisans took seven Franciscans, including the head of the Franciscan Province of Herzegovina Leo Petrović, from the Church of Saint Peter and Paul and executed them. Their bodies were subsequently dumped into the Neretva river.

== Order of battle ==
=== Axis ===
- (Nazi Germany) 369th (Croat) Infantry Division
- (Independent State of Croatia) 9th Mountain Ustashe Home Guard Division
- Nevesinje Chetnik Corps (approximately 600 troops)

=== Partisans ===
- 8th Dalmatian Corps
  - 9th Dalmatian Division
  - 19th Dalmatian Division
  - 26th Dalmatian Division
  - Eighth Corps Artillery Brigade
  - 29th Herzegovina Division
  - First Tank Brigade

== See also ==
- Partisan cemetery in Mostar
