= 8th Corps (Yugoslav Partisans) =

8th Dalmatian Shock Corps
- Flag of the Federal State of Croatia, used by Partisans in Croatia
- Active: 7 October 1943– 2 March 1945
- Country: Yugoslavia
- Branch: (Democratic Federal Yugoslavia) Yugoslav Partisan Army
- Type: Infantry
- Size: Corps
- Part of: 4th Army
- Nicknames: Dalmatian; Udarni (shock)
- Engagements: World War II: Operation Ziethen (1943); Operation Herbstgewitter II (1943); Operation Rösselsprung; Battle of Knin; Mostar Operation

Commanders
- Notable commanders: Vicko Krstulović; Sreten Žujović; Pavle Ilić; Petar Drapšin

The 8th Dalmatian Shock Corps (Serbo-Croatian: 8. dalmatinski korpus) was a corps of the Yugoslav Partisans formed on 7 October 1943. It was formed from the 9th, 19th, 20th, and 26th Dalmatian divisions, and was named after the region of Dalmatia. Upon creation it had 13,049 soldiers. The corps operated in the Independent State of Croatia, Governorate of Dalmatia, and Adriatic Littoral, where they fought Italians, Chetniks, the Ustaše, and Germans.

== Combat record ==
The 8th Corps participated in the liberation of Dalmatia, Herzegovina, western Bosnia, Istria, Kvarner, Lika, Slovenian Littoral, and Trieste. Upon liberation of Knin in December 1944, the corps was named Udarni ('shock'), while the 1st, 2nd, and 3rd Dalmatian Strike Brigades received the Order of the People's Hero. On 2 March 1945 the corps became part of the 4th Army of the Yugoslav Partisans, together with the 7th and 11th Corps, while having 45,524 soldiers. On 20 March 1945, the Dalmatian divisions began a great battle from Lika to Soča, this offensive was in area long over 300 kilometers. In this military operation the 8th Dalmatian Corps had about 5,000 dead and over 15,000 wounded fighters.

During the period from 1943 to 1945, the Corps units fought short and long battles against units of the three German Corps (XV Mountain Corps, V SS Mountain Corps and XCVII Corps). In these conflicts, 8th corps defeated three German and one Ustasha-Home Guard division, while its divisions, as the core of the Fourth Army of the Yugoslav People's Army, participated in the defeat of another three German and two Ustasha-Home Guard divisions. The units of the 8th Corps inflicted a total of 71,000 casualties on the enemy forces, in killed, missing and captured during the liberation of Croatia, parts of Bosnia and Herzegovina and Slovenia.

== Casualties ==
Total wartime losses sustained by the 8th Corps (and subsequently by Dalmatian units within the 4th Army) between October 7, 1943, and May 8, 1945 (when the war ended), totaled 16,059 soldiers killed. When the number of Dalmatians killed between 1941 and 1943 is added, the figure rises to 19,107 fallen combatants—representing 35% of the total number of fatalities within the NOV (National Liberation Army) in Croatia (64,561).

Josip Broz Tito on 13 September 1953, in Split said that this corps "has played historical role in history of our People's Liberation War, that is why he deserves gratitude and recognition" On 30 November 1944 the 8th Dalmatian Corps, without the military command, had 34,548 soldiers, out of which 25,127 were Croats, 4,806 Serbs, 236 Muslims, 61 Jews, and 4,318 others, mostly Slovenes and Montenegrins.[1] In February 1945 Corps numbered over 45,000 fighters, of which about 70% were Croats and the other 30% were Serbs, Muslims, Slovenes, Montenegrins, Italians and others.[2]
