= Orahovo Monastery =

Serbian Orthodox monastery on Skadar Lake, Montenegro

- Location within Montenegro

Religion
- Affiliation: Serbian Orthodox Church
- Ecclesiastical or organizational status: Metropolitanate of Montenegro and the Littoral

Location
- Location: Virpazar, Montenegro
- Interactive map of Orahovo Monastery
- Coordinates: 42.2428°N 19.0651°E

Architecture
- Completed: 1233
- Designated as NHL: John the Baptist and Saint Nicholas

The Orahovo Monastery (Serbian: Манастир Орахово, romanized: Manastir Orahovo) is a Serbian Orthodox monastery in village Orahovo on Skadar Lake, near Virpazar in the Bar, Montenegro municipality, Montenegro.

The monastic complex is one of the oldest monasteries in Montenegro. It has two churches and one residence. The older church is known as Boljan's church (Serbian: Бољанова црква) is dedicated to John the Baptist. The newer church is dedicated to Saint Nicholas. Church of Saint Nicholas was built in 1663. The monastic slava is on every 22 May, celebrating the translation of the holy relics of Saint Nicholas.

According to the traditional legends this monastery was built by Stefan Nemanja.

== See also ==
- List of Serbian monasteries
