= Orahovo, Bar =

Orahovo Орахово
- village
- Location within Montenegro
- Coordinates: 42°14′22″N 19°03′31″E
- Country: Montenegro
- Municipality: Bar

Population (2011)
  - Total: 64
- Time zone: UTC+1 (CET)
  - Summer (DST): UTC+2 (CEST)

Orahovo (Montenegrin Cyrillic: Орахово) is a village in the municipality of Bar, Montenegro. It is considered as part of Crmnica region.

In 1242 king Stefan Vladislav of Serbia issued a charter by which he granted Orahovo to Vranjina Monastery. Around 1296 King Stephen Uroš II Milutin of Serbia again gave Orahovo to Vranjina Monastery as its metoh, as well as 100 perpers annually of income from the St. Sergius market near Skadar. This village hosts one of the oldest monasteries in Montenegro, Orahovo Monastery.

== Demographics ==
According to the 2011 census, its population was 3,800.

Ethnicity in 2011
Ethnicity	Number	Percentage
Montenegrins	48	75.0%
Serbs	15	23.4%
other/undeclared	1	1.6%
Total	64	100%
