= Operation Rösselsprung =

Rösselsprung (which refers to the Knight's Move in chess) was the code-name given to two German operations in World War II:

- Operation Rösselsprung (1942) The planned attack by Tirpitz and other surface vessels against arctic convoy PQ 17 in 1942
- Operation Rösselsprung (1944) The German-led operation to kill or capture Josip Broz Tito at Drvar, Yugoslavia in May 1944
