= XV Mountain Corps =

- Active: 1943–45
- Country: Germany
- Branch: Army
- Type: Mountain
- Role: counter-insurgency
- Size: Corps
- Engagements: Operation Rösselsprung

Commanders
- Notable commanders: Ernst von Leyser; Gustav Fehn

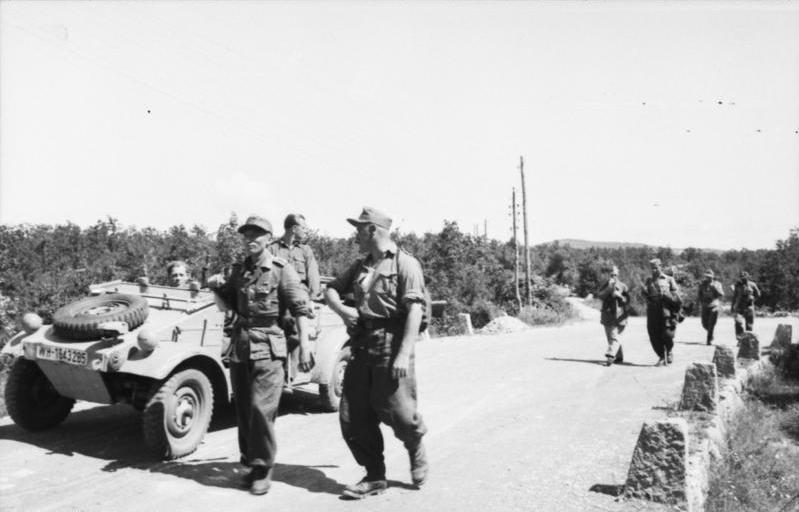
German police operation in Yugoslavia

The XV Mountain Corps was a German military formation that commanded German forces conducting counter-insurgency operations against the Yugoslav Partisans in the Independent State of Croatia during World War II.

It was formed in the Balkans from the staff of the German commander in Croatia (German: Militärbefehlshabers in Kroatien) on 12 August 1943. It was subordinated to the 2nd Panzer Army.

- from its formation until 1 November 1943 the corps was commanded by General der Infanterie (Lieutenant General) Rudolf Lüters.
- between 1 November 1943 and July 1944 it was commanded by General der Infanterie Ernst von Leyser.
- He was replaced in August 1944 by General der Panzertruppe (Lieutenant General) Gustav Fehn who commanded the corps for the rest of the war.

In May 1944, the corps was responsible for the conduct of Operation Rösselsprung, which was aimed at killing the Partisan leader Josip Broz Tito. The corps was effectively destroyed in Partisan Lika-Primorje operation. Remnants of the corps surrendered to the Partisans on 8 May 1945, and Fehn and many of the remaining men of the corps were subsequently killed by the Yugoslav authorities.

== Bibliography ==
- Bishop, Chris (2008). German Infantry in World War II. London: Amber Books. ISBN 978-0-760331-87-3.
- Mitcham, Samuel W. (2007). The German Defeat in the East: 1944-45. Mechanicsburg: Stackpole Books. ISBN 978-0-811733-71-7.
- Mitcham, Samuel W. (2007b). German Order of Battle, Volume 3: Panzer, Panzer Grenadier, and Waffen SS Divisions in WWII. Mechanicsburg: Stackpole Books. ISBN 978-0-811734-38-7.

== Documents ==
- National archive Washington documents:
  - T314, Roll 558 XV. Gebirgs Armeekorps 1943/1944.
  - T314, Roll 559 XV. Gebirgs Armeekorps 1943/1944.
  - T314, Roll 560 XV. Gebirgs Armeekorps 1943/1944.
  - T314, Roll 561 XV. Gebirgs Armeekorps 1943/1944.
  - T314, Roll 562 XV. Gebirgs Armeekorps 1943/1944.
  - T314, Roll 563 XV. Gebirgs Armeekorps 1944.
  - T314, Roll 564 Gebirgs Armeekorps 1944.
  - T314, Roll 565 XV. Gebirgs Armeekorps 1944.
  - T314, Roll 566 XV. Gebirgs Armeekorps 1942/1944.
