= Balkan Air Force =

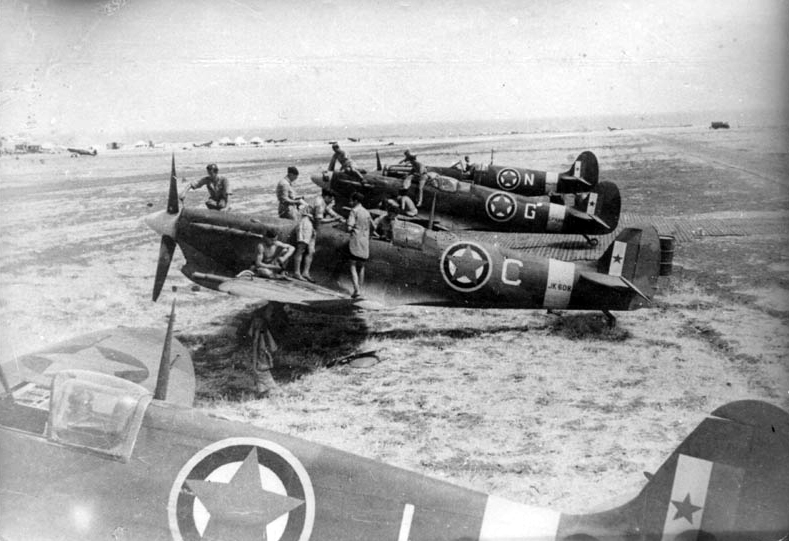
- Spitfire Vc's of the Yugoslav-manned No 352 (Y) Squadron RAF before first mission on 18 August 1944, from airport Canne - Italy
- Active: 7 June 1944 – 15 July 1945
- Country: United Kingdom
- Branch: Royal Air Force
- Garrison/HQ: Bari
- Engagements: World War II: Italian Campaign; Yugoslavia

The Balkan Air Force (BAF) was an Allied air formation operating in the Balkans during World War II. Composed of units of the Royal Air Force and South African Air Force under the Mediterranean Allied Air Forces command, it was active from 7 June 1944 until 15 July 1945. Air Vice Marshal William Elliot and then George Mills, both RAF officers, were its Air Officer Commanding (AOC).

The BAF operated mainly over Yugoslavia, supporting the Partisans against Germany and its allies, but occasionally supporting the Greek and Albanian resistance movements also.

== History ==
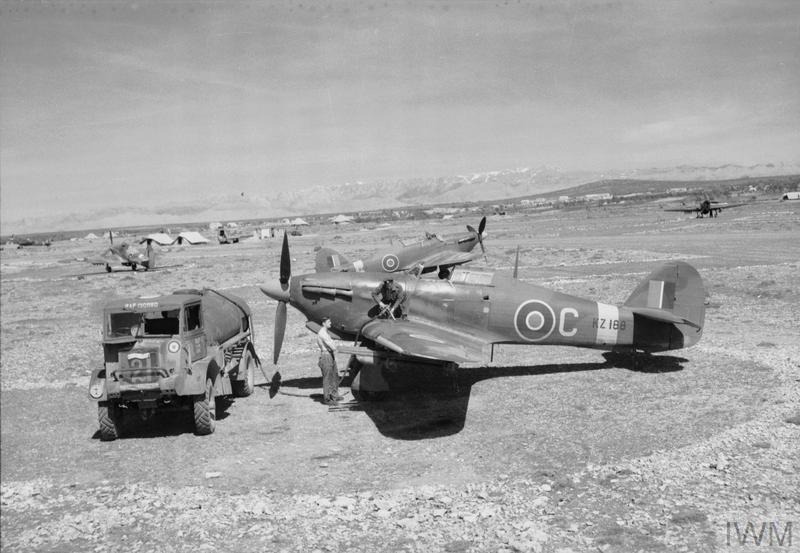
Hurricane Mark IV, KZ188 ?C?, of No. 6 Squadron RAF being refuelled, amid other aircraft of the Squadron, on a dispersal at Prkos, Yugoslavia.

The formation was based at Bari in Italy, and formed on 7 June 1944 from AHQ 'G' Force, to simplify command arrangements for the air support of Special Operations Executive-operations in the Balkans, i.e. across the Adriatic and in the Aegean and Ionian seas. The Desert Air Force had been responsible for those operations, but its prime job was the support of the troops of the Commonwealth Eighth Army which was fighting its way up through Italy, thus making operations over the Balkans a distraction. The Balkan Air Force was a subordinate to Mediterranean Allied Air Forces, the overall allied air formation in the Mediterranean.

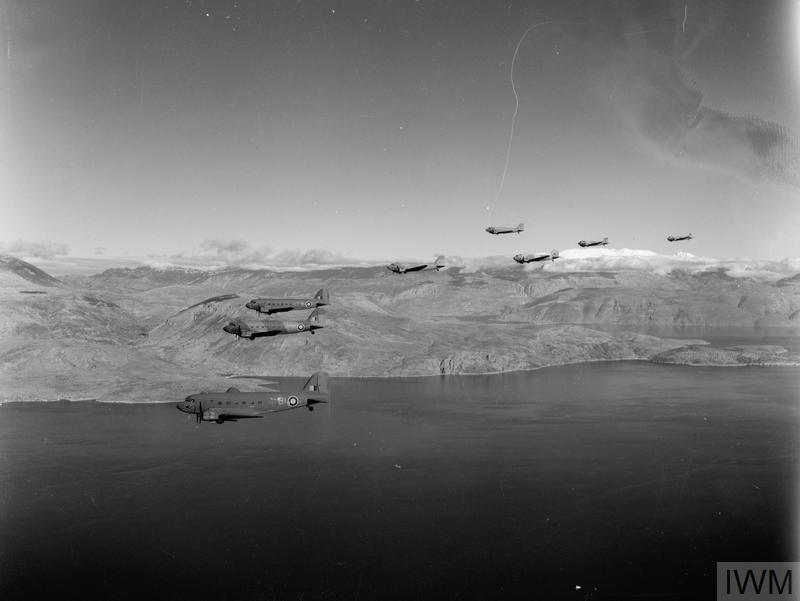
A loose formation of Douglas Dakota Mark IIIs of No. 267 Squadron RAF based at Bari, Italy, flying along the Balkan coast.

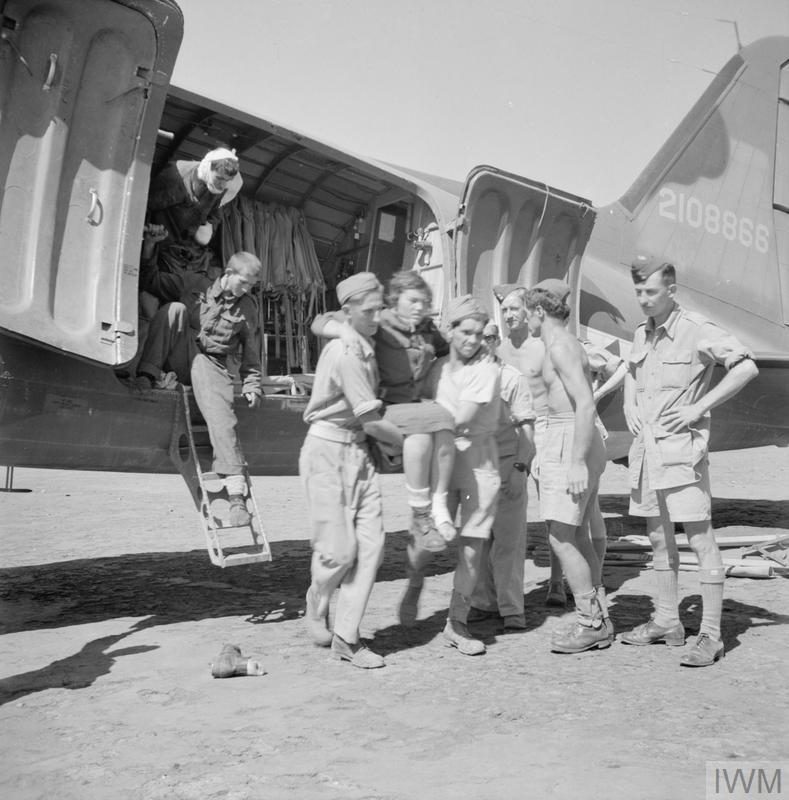
The RAF evacuating wounded Partisans from Yugoslavia. A wounded female Partisan being carried from one of the transport aircraft on arrival in Italy, 1944.

The BAF mainly supported the operations of the Partisans, led by Josip Broz Tito, against German forces in Yugoslavia, but also provided support to Greek and Albanian resistance organisations. It transported supplies to the Partisans, evacuated wounded, dropped agents to help them, and provided air support in their operations against German troops.

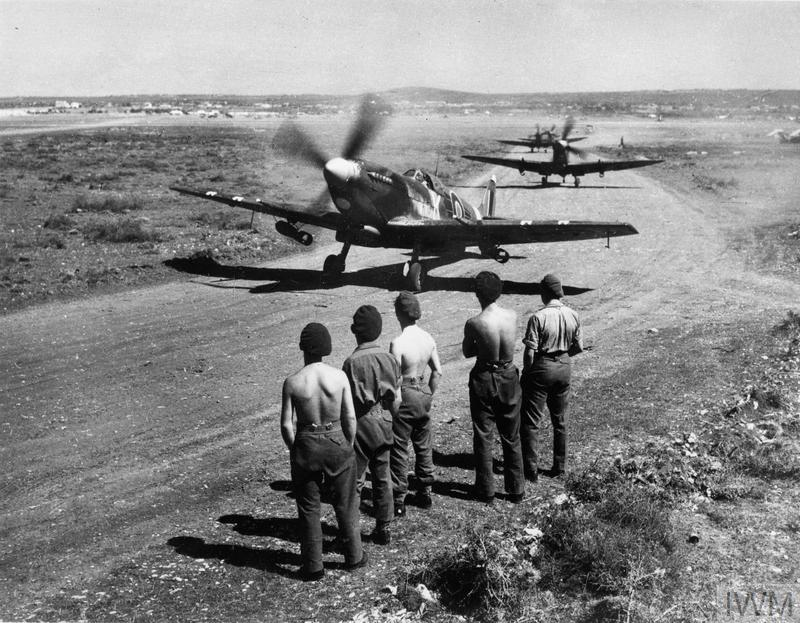
Supermarine Spitfire Mark IXs of No. 73 Squadron RAF, each loaded with two 250-lb GP bombs, taxi to the runway at Prkos, Yugoslavia, for a sortie against retreating German troops and supply lines. They are being watched, in the foreground, by a Bofors gun crew of No. 2914 LAA Squadron RAF Regiment, which provided the anti-aircraft defence for the airfield.

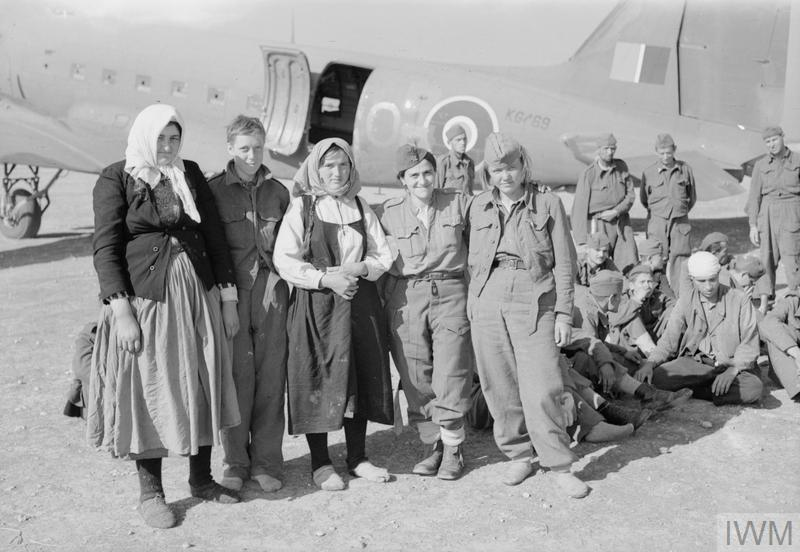
A group of Partisan and civilian women stand with other members of the Yugoslav National Liberation Army after arriving at the air evacuation centre at Bari, Italy, on Douglas Dakota Mark III, KG469 'H', of No. 267 Squadron RAF, seen behind them. Between May 1944 and the spring of 1945, some 50,000 wounded and sick Partisans and civilians were evacuated from Yugoslavia to Italy through the Balkan Air Force.

The Balkan Air Force was a multinational unit, with 15 types of aircraft and men from eight nations: Greece, co-belligerent Italy, Poland, South Africa, Yugoslavia, the UK, USA and USSR (a transport squadron). Between its inception and May 1945 the BAF flew 38,340 sorties, dropped 6,650 tons of bombs, delivered 16,440 tons of supplies and flew 2,500 individuals into Yugoslavia and 19,000 (mostly wounded) out.

Towards the end of its existence, it operated a small number of units from Yugoslav soil to harass the retreating Germans. However, disagreements with Tito (particularly the arrest of members of the Special Boat Squadron on 13 April 1945, although they were quickly released) meant that all British ground forces were withdrawn, although BAF aircraft operating from Zadar continued to support the Partisan offensive. Between 19 March and 3 May they flew 2,727 sorties, attacking the German withdrawal route from Sarajevo to Zagreb and supporting the Fourth Yugoslav Army advancing from Bihać to Rijeka.

The Balkan Air Force was disbanded on 15 July 1945. During its short existence, it was commanded by (British) Royal Air Force Air Vice Marshals William Elliot and George Mills.

== Operations ==
William Deakin, who had met up with the Partisans in May as a representative of Middle East GHQ, was attached as advisor to the newly formed Balkan Air Force, under (then) Air Vice Marshal Elliott, with headquarters at Bari, Italy. This body assumed responsibility for all operations by land, sea, and air into Central and South-Eastern Europe.

Fitzroy Maclean the head of the British military mission to the Partisans said that, as the Balkan Air Force was also responsible for the "planning and co-ordination of all supply dropping" to the Partisans, it "gave me a single authority with whom I could deal direct and was of incalculable advantage in obtaining quick results". This was decisive in enabling the Partisans to withstand the Raid on Drvar (Seventh Offensive).

Much of the planning for Operation Ratweek to impede the German withdrawal from the Balkans was done at BAF Headquarters and Maclean’s own Rear Headquarters at Bari. Ratweek, started on 1 September 1944, also involved the Navy and the Partisans. USAAF Flying Fortresses (50) were called in to bomb Leskovac and impede the German withdrawal, though with many civilian casualties.

The Balkan Air Terminal Service (BATS) was formed by the BAF to improve the supply of materiel to the Partisans. Teams of the BATS parachuted into Yugoslavia to meet up with the Partisans. Together they then set up a number of landing strips which transport aircraft could land at. Through these concealed airstrips, more supplies could be delivered to the Partisans and wounded Partisans could be flown out for treatment, as well as the delivery and removal of British Special Operations Executive (SOE) and American Office of Strategic Services (OSS) teams.

== Units of the Air Force ==
- 13th Light Bomber Squadron RHAF
- No. 25 Squadron SAAF
- No. 37 Squadron RAF
- No. 39 Squadron RAF
- No. 351 Squadron RAF
- No. 352 Squadron RAF
- No. 1435 Squadron RAF
- No. 281 Wing RAF
  - No. 6 Squadron RAF – Hawker Hurricane for ground attack
- No. 283 Wing RAF
  - No. 213 Squadron RAF
- No. 334 Wing RAF
  - No. 267 Squadron RAF, as well as operations in the Balkans 267 Squadron could reach Poland and flew operations to deliver and collect agents.
  - 60th Troop Carrier Group – Dakota

From June 1944, a Soviet unit of 12 Dakotas and 12 Yakovlev fighters to support the USSR military mission to the Partisans and drop supplies came under the BAF.

At the same time, the BAF coordinated operations in the Adriatic area by Land Forces, Adriatic and the naval forces under the command of the Flag Officer, Taranto.

== Gallery of images ==
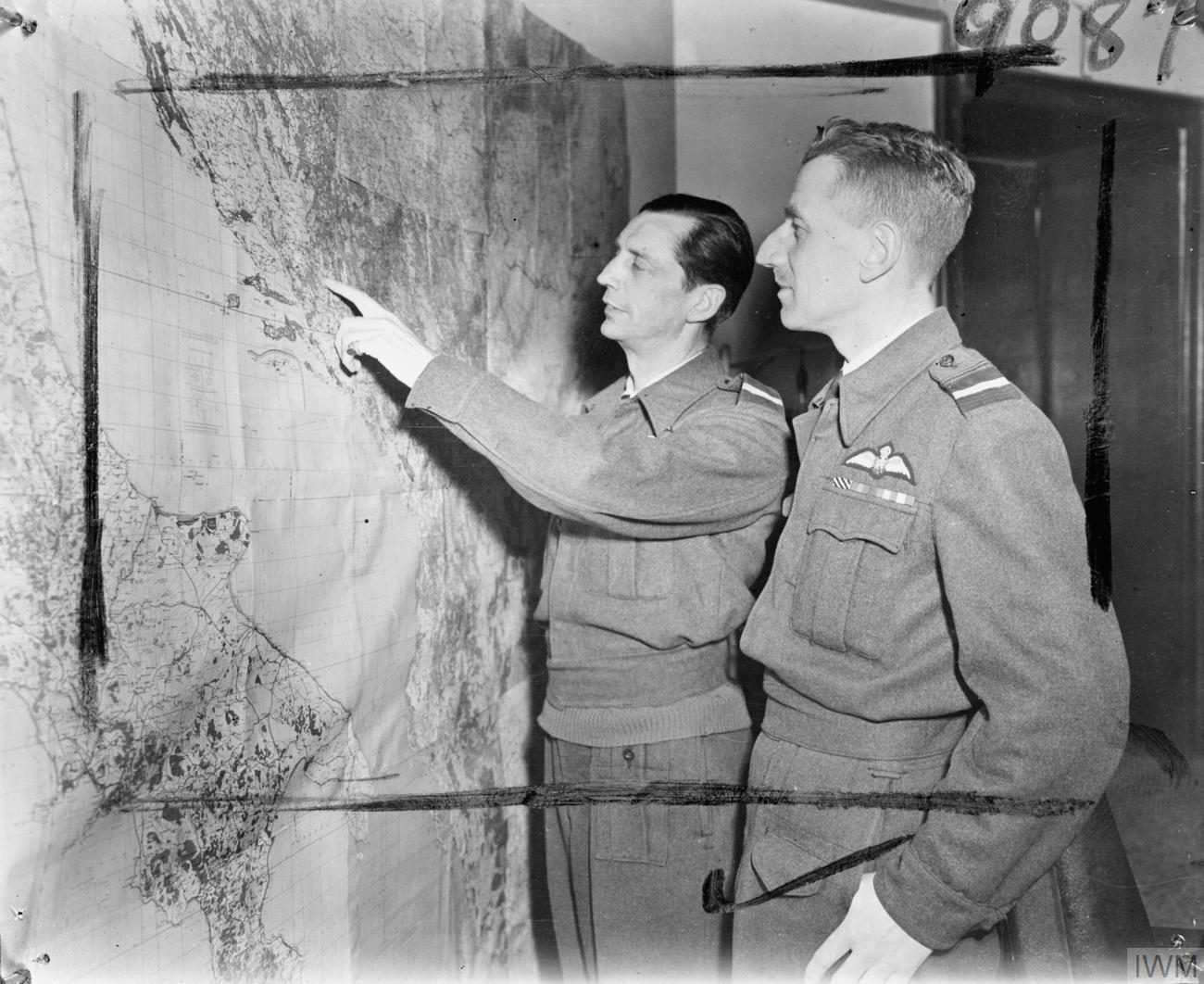
Air Vice-Marshals W Elliot and G H Mills at BAF Headquarters, Bari 1945.

BAF ammunition transports to partisan (YNLA) troops.

BAF (YNLA AF) Hurricane attack on enemy shipping, Adriatic Sea.

Zadar flightline with a BAF B-24 Liberator

Partisan wounded being evacuated by BAF DC-3s to Italy. (background).

== See also ==
- List of Royal Air Force commands
