= Orahovo, Travnik =

Village in Bosnia and Herzegovina

Orahovo
- Village
- Location within Bosnia and Herzegovina
- Coordinates: 44.2838264°N 17.7219644°E
- Country: Bosnia and Herzegovina
- Entity: Federation of Bosnia and Herzegovina
- Canton: Central Bosnia
- Municipality: Travnik

Area
  - Total: 2.29 sq mi (5.92 km^{2})

Population (2013)
  - Total: 328
  - Density: 143/sq mi (55.4/km^{2})
- Time zone: UTC+1 (CET)
  - Summer (DST): UTC+2 (CEST)

Orahovo is a village in the municipality of Travnik, Bosnia and Herzegovina.

== Demographics ==
According to the 2013 census, its population was 328.

Ethnicity in 2013
Ethnicity	Number	Percentage
Bosniaks	326	99.4%
other/undeclared	2	0.6%
Total	328	100%
