= Babin Potok, Donji Vakuf =

Babin Potok
- Village
- Location within Bosnia and Herzegovina
- Coordinates: 44°12′N 17°20′E
- Country: Bosnia and Herzegovina
- Entity: Federation of Bosnia and Herzegovina
- Canton: Central Bosnia
- Municipality: Donji Vakuf

Area
  - Total: 2.24 sq mi (5.81 km^{2})

Population (2013)
  - Total: 103
  - Density: 45.9/sq mi (17.7/km^{2})
- Time zone: UTC+1 (CET)
  - Summer (DST): UTC+2 (CEST)

Babin Potok is a village in the municipality of Donji Vakuf, Bosnia and Herzegovina.

== Demographics ==
According to the 2013 census, its population was 103.

Ethnicity in 2013
| Ethnicity | Number | Percentage |
|---|---|---|
| Bosniaks | 99 | 96.1% |
| other/undeclared | 4 | 3.9% |
| Total | 103 | 100% |
