= 19th Division (Yugoslav Partisans) =

19th Dalmatia Division
- Flag of the Federal State of Croatia, used by Croatian Partisans
- Active: 1943–1945
- Country: Democratic Federal Yugoslavia
- Branch: Yugoslav Partisan Army
- Type: Infantry
- Size: 3,559 (upon formation)
- Part of: 8th Corps
- Engagements: World War II in Yugoslavia

Commanders
- Notable commanders: Milan Kuprešanin

The 19th North Dalmatia Division (Serbo-Croatian Latin: Devetnaesta severnodalmatinska divizija) was a Yugoslav Partisan division formed in Biovičino Selo on 4 October 1943. Upon formation it had 3,559 soldiers in three brigades, those being: the 5th, 6th and 7th Dalmatia Brigades. During all of its existence it was a part of the 8th Corps. Commander of the division was Milan Kuprešanin while its political commissar was Petar Babić. The division mostly operated in Dalmatia, Lika and Bosnia.
