= 26th Division (Yugoslav Partisans) =

Yugoslav Partisan military division formed in 1943

26th Dalmatian Division
- Flag of the Federal State of Croatia, used by Croatian Partisans
- Active: 1943–1945
- Country: Democratic Federal Yugoslavia
- Branch: Yugoslav Partisan Army
- Type: Infantry
- Size: ~3,800 (upon formation)
- Engagements: World War II in Yugoslavia

Commanders
- Notable commanders: Nikola Martinović (8 October 1943 - 26 December 1944) †; Božo Božović (26 December 1944 - May 1945)

The 26th Dalmatian Assault Division (Serbo-Croatian Latin: Dvadesetšesta dalmatinska udarna divizija) was a Yugoslav Partisan division formed on 8 October 1943. It was formed from the 11th, 12th and 13th Dalmatia Brigades. In January 1944, the 13th Dalmatia Brigade left the division while the 1st Dalmatia Brigade joined it. The 3rd Overseas Brigade joined the division in March 1944. The division mostly operated in the Southern Dalmatia where it fought against parts of the 2nd Panzer Army, 118th Jäger Division, 7th SS Division, and 369th Infantry Division.
