= List of Hawker Hurricane operators =

This is a list of the Hawker Hurricane operators.

== Operators ==
=== Australia ===
Royal Australian Air Force

The following units served with the Desert Air Force in the Mediterranean Theatre:

- No. 3 Squadron RAAF
- No. 450 Squadron RAAF (combined operations with No. 260 Squadron RAF)
- No. 451 Squadron RAAF

Only one Hurricane (V7476) saw service in Australia. It had been shipped, unassembled to No. 226 Group RAF in the Dutch East Indies during early 1942. It was among elements of 226 Grp evacuated to Australia before the Allied defeat in Java. After assembly by RAAF ground staff, this Hurricane served with the following units:

- No. 1 Communications Flight RAAF
- No. 2 Communications Flight RAAF
- No. 2 Operational Training Unit RAAF
- Central Flying School RAAF

The Hurricane was retired in 1946 and is believed to have been scrapped.

=== Belgium ===
Belgian Air Force

Belgium bought 20 Hurricane Mk.Is (early models with fabric covered wings and fixed two-blade propeller) in 1939 and a licence to build 80 more, of which only two were completed, with most of the aircraft being lost during the German invasion when they were bombed at the military airfield at Schaffen near Diest on 10 May 1940. After the war, six ex-RAF Hurricane Mk.IIs (a mix of Mk.IIB and C) were transferred to the Belgians in 1946, these were used as fast communications aircraft up to 1948.

=== Canada ===
Several Royal Canadian Air Force squadrons were equipped with Hurricanes, including 1 Squadron RCAF, which flew in the Battle of Britain.

Royal Canadian Air Force

- Article XV squadrons serving under direct command and control of the RAF.
  - No. 1 Squadron RCAF re-numbered to No. 401 Squadron RCAF
  - No. 2 Squadron RCAF re-numbered to No. 402 Squadron RCAF
  - No. 417 Squadron RCAF
  - No. 421 Squadron RCAF
  - No. 438 Squadron RCAF
  - No. 439 Squadron RCAF
  - No. 440 Squadron RCAF
- Operational Squadrons of the Home War Establishment (HWE) (Based in Canada)
  - Eastern Air Command
  - No. 1 Squadron RCAF
  - No. 125 Squadron RCAF
  - No. 126 Squadron RCAF
  - No. 127 Squadron RCAF
  - No. 128 Squadron RCAF
  - No. 129 Squadron RCAF
  - No. 130 Squadron RCAF
  - Western Air Command
  - No. 133 Squadron RCAF
  - No. 135 Squadron RCAF

=== Czechoslovakia ===
Czechoslovak Air Force in exile in Great Britain

- No. 310 Czech Fighter Squadron
- No. 312 Czech Fighter Squadron

=== Egypt ===
Royal Egyptian Air Force

=== Finland ===
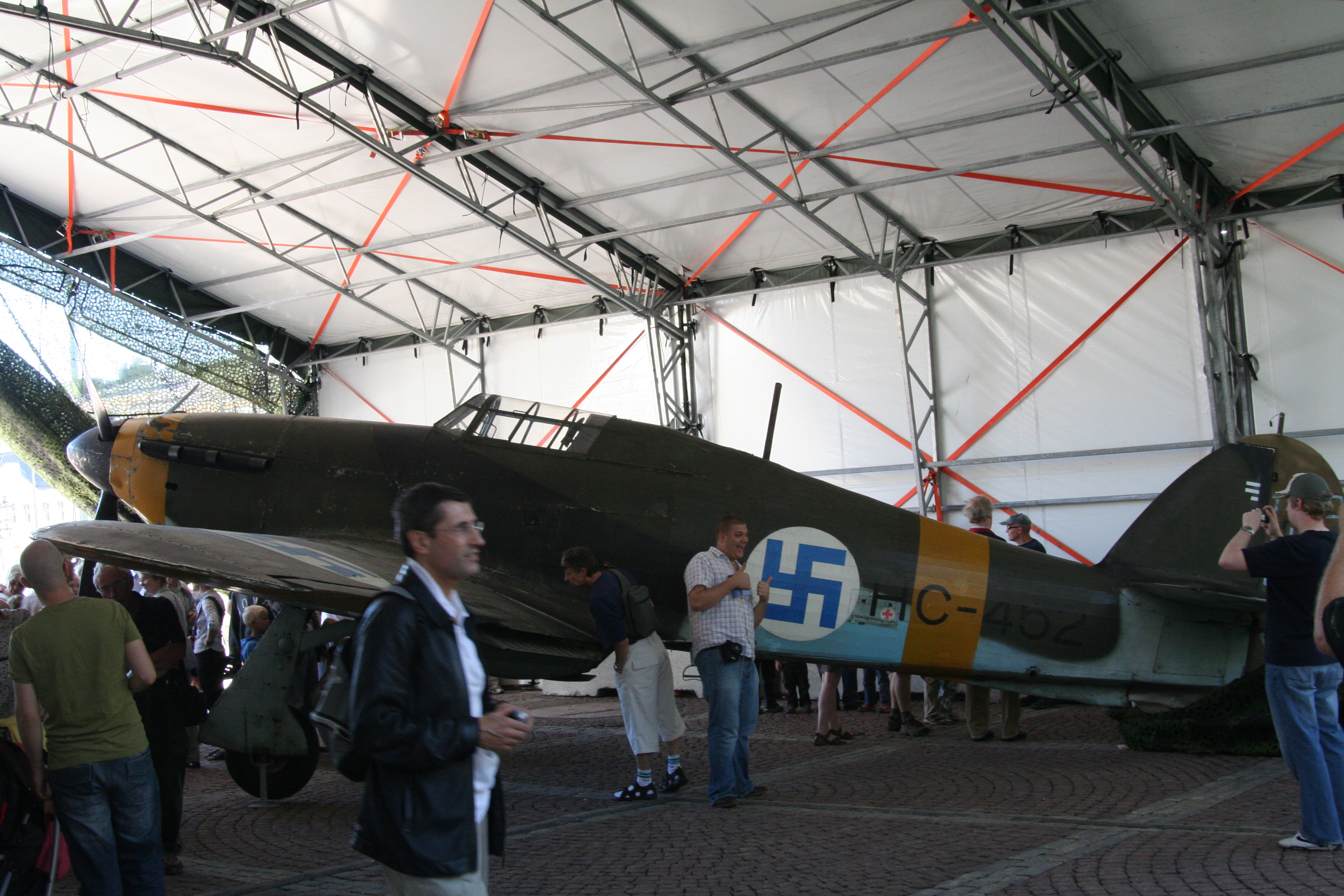
A Finnish Hurricane from WWII in Helsinki

Finland bought 12 Mk.I Hurricanes at the end of the Winter War, but lost two during the transit flight. The aircraft did not have much success (only 5½ kills). When hostilities began again on 25 June 1941, their use was quite limited, partially because they were worn out due to the scarcity of replacement parts available during the Interim Peace (13 March 1940 – 25 June 1941) and subsequent combat flying. One Hurricane Mk.IIB was captured from the Soviets during the war and flown by the Finnish Air Force.

Finnish Air Force

- No. 10 Squadron, Finnish Air Force
- No. 22 Squadron, Finnish Air Force
- No. 26 Squadron, Finnish Air Force
- No. 28 Squadron, Finnish Air Force
- No. 30 Squadron, Finnish Air Force
- No. 32 Squadron, Finnish Air Force
- No. 34 Squadron, Finnish Air Force

=== Free France ===
Hurricanes also joined the ranks of the Forces Aériennes Françaises Libres (FAFL), the Free French Air Force, fighting in North Africa between June 1940 and May 1943. The Hurricanes, like all FAFL aircraft, sported the Cross of Lorraine on the fuselage, instead of the roundel in order to distinguish them from those aircraft flying for the Vichy French air force. These squadrons were generally formed within the RAF, so that Groupe de Chasse Alsace was known in British circles as the No. 341 Squadron RAF. French flying ace, James Denis, piloted one of such Hurricanes during the Allied campaigns in North Africa.

Free French Air Force

- Escadrille de Chasse No. 1
- Escadrille de Chasse No. 2
- Groupe de Chasse II/3 'Alsace'
- French Aviation School, Meknes, Morocco

Free French Naval Air Service

=== Nazi Germany ===
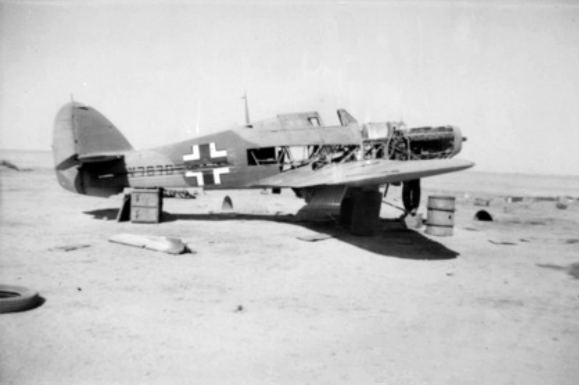
A Hawker Hurricane Mk.1 aircraft (RAF serial V7670) painted in Luftwaffe colours. This aircraft was captured by the Germans in March 1941 and then recaptured at Gambut Airfield in 1942.

The Luftwaffe operated some captured Hurricanes for training and education purposes.

Luftwaffe

=== Kingdom of Greece ===
Royal Hellenic Air Force

- 335th Fighter Squadron (No. 335 Squadron RAF)
- 336th Fighter Squadron (No. 336 Squadron RAF)

=== British India ===
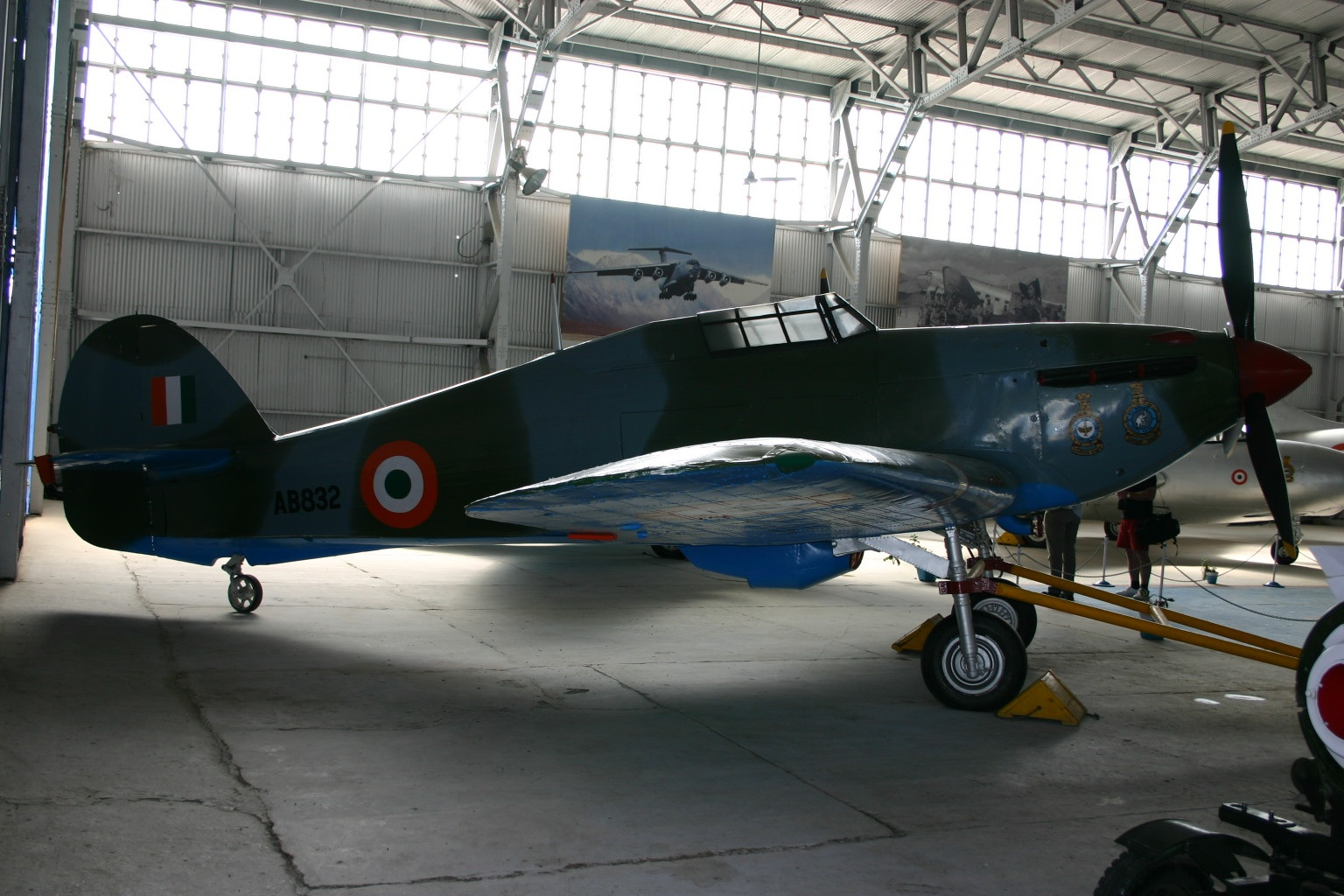
Hawker Hurricane Mk XII Indian Air Force.

Royal Indian Air Force

- No.1 Squadron, IAF
- No.2 Squadron, IAF
- No.3 Squadron, IAF
- No.4 Squadron, IAF
- No.6 Squadron, IAF
- No.7 Squadron, IAF
- No.9 Squadron, PAF
- No.10 Squadron, IAF
- No.1 Service Flying and Training School, Ambala

=== Iran ===
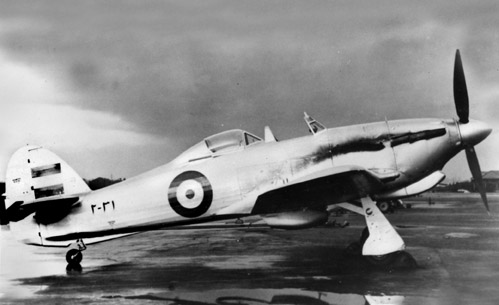
Two-seat Hawker Hurricane Trainer no 2-31.

First Hurricane (P3270) was delivered from RAF unit. Next 10 aircraft were left by No. 74 Squadron RAF in May 1943 when unit was sent to Egypt. Last 18 Hurricane IIC were delivered in 1946, two of them were rebuilt as two-seat trainers.

Imperial Iranian Air Force

- Advanced Fighter Training Group, DoshanTeppeh

=== Ireland ===
The Irish Air Corps replaced its Gloster Gladiators with Hawker Hurricanes. During World War II, some Hurricanes which either landed accidentally or force-landed in neutral Ireland were immediately impounded and/or repaired by the authorities, while others were purchased direct from Britain. By the end of the war there were a total of 18 Hurricanes in service, which were gradually withdrawn after the Air Corps received a squadron's worth of Supermarine Seafires in 1947.

Irish Air Corps

=== Kingdom of Italy ===
Regia Aeronautica

Two Hurricanes Mk.I, built by Zmaj Aircraft under license, were captured by the Italians when they took over Zemun airfield near Belgrade. Both were later test-flown at the Guidonia facility where more captured aircraft were hoarded. One of them was prominently featured in Roberto Rossellini's period film Un Pilota Ritorna alongside a Bristol Blenheim Mk.IV. Two more fell into Italian hands during the war – one in North Africa and one that touched down intact at Comiso airfield. Their serial numbers are not known.

=== Empire of Japan ===
Japanese soldiers captured at least two Hurricanes in Singapore.

Imperial Japanese Army Air Force

- Tachikawa GiKen tested Hurricane Mk.IIB Trop (BE208).
- 1 Chutai of the 64 Sentai tested Hurricane Mk.IIB Trop (BM900).

=== Netherlands ===
Royal Netherlands East Indies Army Air Force

=== New Zealand ===
New Zealand operated Hurricanes in 486 and 488 Squadrons. Following the fall of Singapore, 488 Squadron's Hurricanes were transferred to New Zealand home service, where some ended their days as airfield decoys. 486 Squadron was formed and operated as a nightfighter unit, operating in conjunction with a Turbinlite Flight, before re-equipping with the Typhoon and becoming a day fighter unit in September 1942.

Royal New Zealand Air Force

- No. 486 Squadron RNZAF
- No. 488 Squadron RNZAF

=== Norway ===
Royal Norwegian Air Force

Two squadrons of Norwegian pilots in the RAF used Hurricane Mk.I and Mk.IIb defending the Scapa Flow naval base on the Orkneys in 1941. In summer 1942, both were transferred South to 11 group, trading in their Hurricanes for Spitfires. A single Hurricane flew in Norway after the war, used for evaluation only.

- No. 331 Squadron Royal Norwegian Air Force
- No. 332 Squadron RAF

=== Poland ===
First Hurricanes were bought by Poland in 1939 but were not delivered before 1 September 1939 and were sent to Turkey instead. Polish pilots flew Hurricanes in Polish squadrons formed in Great Britain in 1940 and No. 302 and No. 303 Polish Fighter Squadrons took part during Battle of Britain.

Polish Air Forces in exile in Great Britain

- No. 302 Polish Fighter Squadron "Poznański"
- No. 303 Polish Fighter Squadron "Warszawski Dywizjon im. Tadeusza Kościuszki"
- No. 306 Polish Fighter Squadron "Toruński"
- No. 308 Polish Fighter Squadron "Krakowski"
- No. 309 Polish Army-Cooperation Squadron "Ziemi Czerwieńskiej"
- No. 315 Polish Fighter Squadron "Dębliński"
- No. 316 Polish Fighter Squadron "Warszawski"
- No. 317 Polish Fighter Squadron "Wileński"
- No. 318 Polish Fighter-Reconnaissance Squadron "Gdański"

=== Portugal ===
Arma de Aeronautica

- Esquadrilhas BA 2 (Ota)
- Esquadrilhas BA 3 (Tancos)
- Lisbon Defense Squadron (Lisboa)

=== Kingdom of Romania ===
In 1939, a Romanian military delegation was sent to the United Kingdom to order 50 Hurricane Mk.Is, with 12 for urgent delivery. Only 12 aircraft were delivered from Britain before Romania joined the Axis. Three more Hurricanes, formerly belonging to the Yugoslav Royal Air Force were bought from Germany in 1941. All aircraft were assigned to the Escadrila 53 Vânătoare/Fighter Squadron No. 53 (transferred to the Dobrogea Air Command from 7th Fighter Group) and were used during the Operation Barbarossa to protect the Black Sea coast, including the vital Constanța harbour and the strategic Cernavodă railway bridge across the Danube.

Some of the first Romanian aerial victories of the war (23 June 1941) were achieved by Lt Horia Agarici of Escadrila 53, who was flying a damaged Hawker Hurricane Mk.I, with engine overheating problems.

At 12 o'clock at the Mamaia airfield, the alarm sounded as Soviet bombers were reported. The bombers were heading for Constanța to attack the harbour. Despite regulations, Agarici took off without orders, without a wingman and with a single full tank of fuel. Soon he spotted a group of five Ilyushin DB-3 bombers, flying at 600 m (2,000 ft) with no fighter escort, attempting to bomb the Romanian port. Taking advantage of a favorable position, Agarici attacked. First shooting the bomber at the head of the formation, the Soviet aircraft fell into the sea and exploded. After a diving turn and a half barrel roll, Agarici returned to attack, shooting the second airplane from its right side. Then he attacked the third bomber, who was heading towards the ground, although it did not not have a fire on board. The other two Soviet bombers disappeared during this time, abandoning the mission, and Horia Agarici returned to Mamaia airfield, at fuel limit.

In the early days of the war, the Romanian Hurricane pilots shot down eight aircraft without any losses. On 30 June, Esc. 53 Vt. had a particularly successful day. During three air combats, Hurricane pilots claimed 10 Soviet "Grumman" fighters (probably Polikarpov I-153s) over Ismail-Tulcea, near Danube, for no losses.

Two Hurricanes were lost by the end of 1941, one of which was shot down in battle, while the squadron achieved 52 air victories. Warrant officer Andrei Rădulescu managed to be the second ace in the entire campaign, having seven confirmed victories and four unconfirmed with his Hurricane. Escadrila 53 Vânătoare gradually replaced Hurricanes with the Romanian IAR 80s and later with German Bf 109s.

=== South Africa ===
South African Air Force operated several squadrons of Hurricanes as part of the Desert Air Force, including 40 Squadron.

South African Air Force

- 1 Squadron SAAF
- 2 Squadron SAAF
- 3 Squadron SAAF
- 7 Squadron SAAF
- 40 Squadron SAAF
- 41 Squadron SAAF
- 43 Squadron SAAF
- 11 OTU SAAF
- SAAF Central Flying School, Norton, South Rhodesia

=== Soviet Union ===
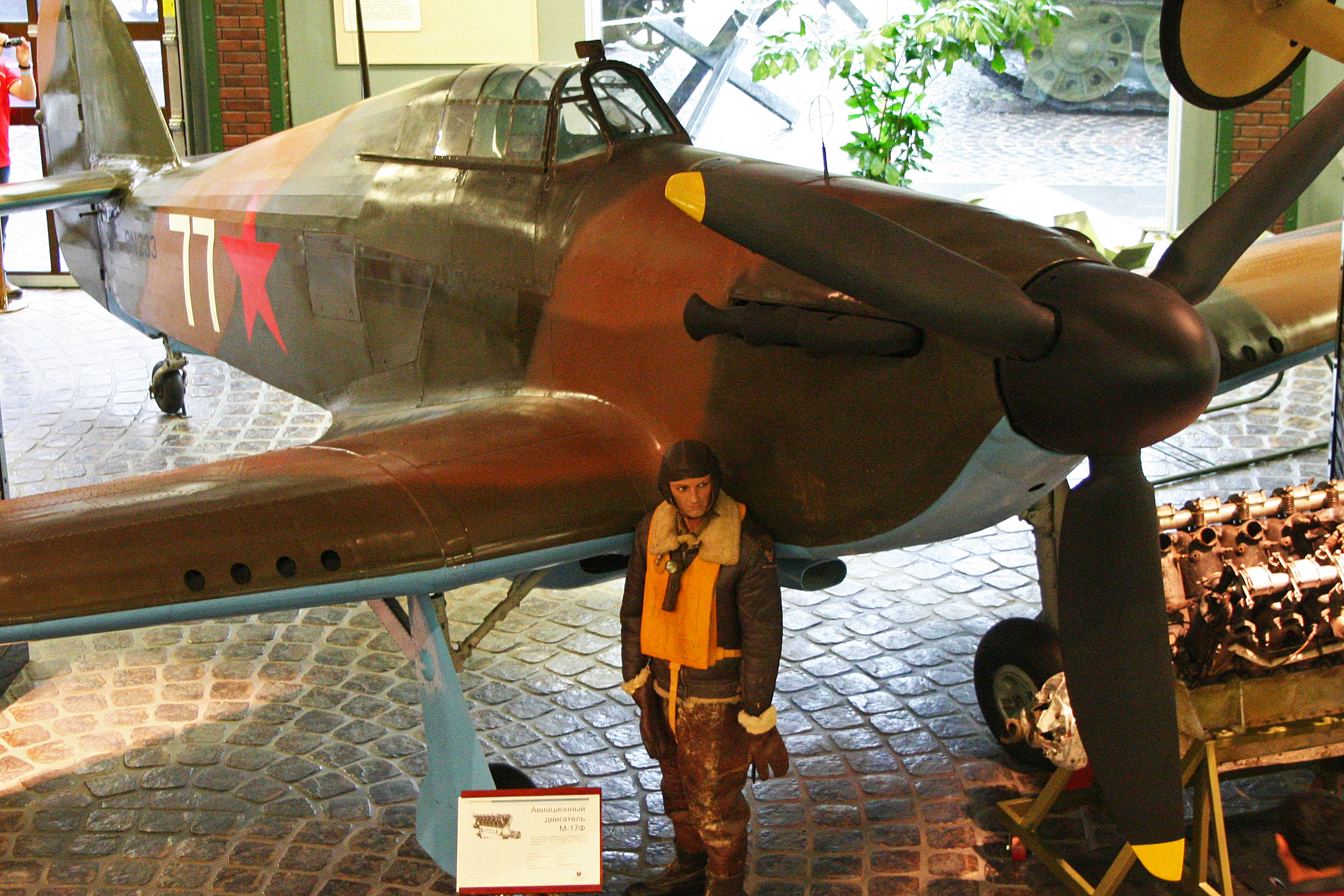
Hawker Hurricane inside the Vadim Zadorozhny Technical Museum

The Soviet Union received 2,952 aircraft of several variants under Lend-Lease Act agreements. These aircraft served on all fronts. One Hurricane Mk.IIB was captured from the Soviets during the war and flown by the Finnish Air Force.

Russian Wikipedia writes that the 894th Fighter Aviation Regiment was equipped with the Hawker Hurricane.

Soviet Air Forces

- 1 GvIAP
- 20 GvIAP
- 9 IAP
- 27 IAP
- 46 IAP
- 145 IAP
- 157 IAP
- 180 IAP
- 191 IAP
- 197 IAP
- 246 IAP
- 287 IAP
- 436 IAP
- 438 IAP
- 485 IAP
- 609 IAP
- 743 IAP
- 814 IAP
- 831 IAP
- 832 IAP
- 858 IAP
- 760 SAP
- 22 ZAP
- 25 ZIAP
- 27 ZIAP

Soviet Air Defence Forces

- 26 GvIAP PVO
- 83 GvIAP PVO
- 67 IAP PVO
- 429 IAP PVO
- 439 IAP PVO
- 441 IAP PVO
- 488 IAP PVO
- 730 IAP PVO
- 736 IAP PVO
- 767 IAP PVO
- 768 IAP PVO
- 769 IAP PVO
- 833 IAP PVO
- 926 IAP PVO
- 933 IAP PVO
- 934 IAP PVO
- 964 IAP PVO

Soviet Naval Aviation

- 2 GvIAP VVS VMF
- 3 GvIAP VVS VMF
- 27 IAP VVS VMF
- 78 IAP VVS VMF

=== Turkey ===
Turkey bought Hurricanes in 1939.

Turkish Air Force

=== United Kingdom ===
The last Hurricanes were withdrawn from RAF first-line service in February 1947, although two remain in service with the RAF's Battle of Britain Memorial Flight.

Royal Air Force

- No. 1 Squadron RAF
- No. 3 Squadron RAF
- No. 5 Squadron RAF
- No. 6 Squadron RAF
- No. 11 Squadron RAF (SEAC)
- No. 17 Squadron RAF
- No. 20 Squadron RAF (SEAC)
- No. 27 Squadron RAF
- No. 28 Squadron RAF
- No. 29 Squadron RAF
- No. 30 Squadron RAF
- No. 32 Squadron RAF
- No. 33 Squadron RAF
- No. 34 Squadron RAF (SEAC)
- No. 42 Squadron RAF
- No. 43 Squadron RAF
- No. 46 Squadron RAF
- No. 56 Squadron RAF
- No. 60 Squadron RAF
- No. 63 Squadron RAF – (Bombardment spotting)
- No. 67 Squadron RAF
- No. 69 Squadron RAF
- No. 71 Squadron RAF
- No. 73 Squadron RAF
- No. 74 Squadron RAF
- No. 79 Squadron RAF
- No. 80 Squadron RAF
- No. 81 Squadron RAF
- No. 85 Squadron RAF
- No. 87 Squadron RAF
- No. 91 Squadron RAF
- No. 92 Squadron RAF
- No. 94 Squadron RAF
- No. 95 Squadron RAF
- No. 96 Squadron RAF
- No. 98 Squadron RAF – (Coastal patrol)
- No. 111 Squadron RAF
- No. 113 Squadron RAF
- No. 116 Squadron RAF
- No. 121 Squadron RAF
- No. 123 Squadron RAF
- No. 126 Squadron RAF
- No. 127 Squadron RAF
- No. 128 Squadron RAF
- No. 131 Squadron RAF
- No. 133 Squadron RAF
- No. 134 Squadron RAF
- No. 135 Squadron RAF
- No. 136 Squadron RAF
- No. 137 Squadron RAF
- No. 145 Squadron RAF
- No. 146 Squadron RAF
- No. 151 Squadron RAF
- No. 164 Squadron RAF
- No. 173 Squadron RAF – (Communications)
- No. 174 Squadron RAF
- No. 175 Squadron RAF
- No. 176 Squadron RAF
- No. 181 Squadron RAF
- No. 182 Squadron RAF
- No. 183 Squadron RAF
- No. 184 Squadron RAF
- No. 185 Squadron RAF
- No. 186 Squadron RAF
- No. 193 Squadron RAF
- No. 195 Squadron RAF
- No. 198 Squadron RAF
- No. 208 Squadron RAF
- No. 213 Squadron RAF
- No. 225 Squadron RAF
- No. 229 Squadron RAF
- No. 232 Squadron RAF
- No. 237 Squadron RAF
- No. 238 Squadron RAF
- No. 239 Squadron RAF
- No. 241 Squadron RAF
- No. 242 Squadron RAF
- No. 245 Squadron RAF
- No. 247 Squadron RAF
- No. 249 Squadron RAF
- No. 250 Squadron RAF
- No. 253 Squadron RAF
- No. 255 Squadron RAF
- No. 256 Squadron RAF
- No. 257 Squadron RAF
- No. 258 Squadron RAF
- No. 260 Squadron RAF – (Combined operations with No. 450 Squadron RAAF)
- No. 261 Squadron RAF
- No. 263 Squadron RAF
- No. 273 Squadron RAF
- No. 274 Squadron RAF
- No. 276 Squadron RAF
- No. 279 Squadron RAF
- No. 283 Squadron RAF
- No. 284 Squadron RAF – (Air-Sea Rescue)
- No. 285 Squadron RAF
- No. 286 Squadron RAF
- No. 287 Squadron RAF
- No. 288 Squadron RAF
- No. 289 Squadron RAF
- No. 290 Squadron RAF
- No. 291 Squadron RAF
- No. 501 Squadron RAF
- No. 504 Squadron RAF
- No. 516 Squadron RAF
- No. 518 Squadron RAF
- No. 520 Squadron RAF
- No. 521 Squadron RAF – (Meteorological)
- No. 527 Squadron RAF – (Calibration)
- No. 530 Squadron RAF
- No. 531 Squadron RAF
- No. 532 Squadron RAF
- No. 533 Squadron RAF
- No. 534 Squadron RAF
- No. 535 Squadron RAF
- No. 536 Squadron RAF
- No. 537 Squadron RAF
- No. 538 Squadron RAF
- No. 539 Squadron RAF
- No. 567 Squadron RAF
- No. 577 Squadron RAF
- No. 587 Squadron RAF
- No. 595 Squadron RAF
- No. 598 Squadron RAF
- No. 601 Squadron RAF
- No. 605 Squadron RAF
- No. 607 Squadron RAF
- No. 610 Squadron RAF
- No. 615 Squadron RAF
- No. 624 Squadron RAF
- No. 631 Squadron RAF
- No. 639 Squadron RAF
- No. 650 Squadron RAF
- No. 667 Squadron RAF
- No. 679 Squadron RAF
- No. 691 Squadron RAF
- No. 695 Squadron RAF
- No. 680 Squadron RAF
- No. 681 Squadron RAF
- No. 1432 Flight RAF
- Night Fighter Unit

Fleet Air Arm

- 702 Naval Air Squadron
- 731 Naval Air Squadron
- 748 Naval Air Squadron
- 759 Naval Air Squadron
- 760 Naval Air Squadron
- 761 Naval Air Squadron
- 762 Naval Air Squadron
- 766 Naval Air Squadron
- 768 Naval Air Squadron
- 769 Naval Air Squadron
- 771 Naval Air Squadron
- 774 Naval Air Squadron
- 778 Naval Air Squadron
- 779 Naval Air Squadron
- 781 Naval Air Squadron
- 787 Naval Air Squadron
- 788 Naval Air Squadron
- 789 Naval Air Squadron
- 791 Naval Air Squadron
- 792 Naval Air Squadron
- 794 Naval Air Squadron
- 795 Naval Air Squadron
- 800 Naval Air Squadron
- 801 Naval Air Squadron
- 802 Naval Air Squadron
- 804 Naval Air Squadron
- 806 Naval Air Squadron
- 813 Naval Air Squadron
- 824 Naval Air Squadron
- 825 Naval Air Squadron
- 835 Naval Air Squadron
- 877 Naval Air Squadron
- 880 Naval Air Squadron
- 882 Naval Air Squadron
- 883 Naval Air Squadron
- 885 Naval Air Squadron
- 891 Naval Air Squadron
- 895 Naval Air Squadron
- 897 Naval Air Squadron

=== United States ===
United States Army Air Force

Although not officially adopted as a USAAF aircraft, at least three examples were 'acquired' at various times, retaining their original RAF serials.

- P3757 Hurricane Mk.I - this aircraft had an eventful history, being involved in a landing accident during the Battle of Britain, and subsequently struck off charge. Somehow passing on to the USAAF, probably as a liaison or 'hack' aircraft, it was involved in three more landing accidents, before a more substantial wheels-up emergency landing off-airport.
- BP654 Hurricane Mk.IIb (modified) - this aircraft was 'acquired' by the 350th FG, 12th AF (Italy), was converted to a 2-seater, and painted with a sharks mouth (and eyes!).
- LB640 Hurricane Mk.IIc (modified) - another example that was 'acquired' by the 350th FG, 12th AF (Italy), also converted to a 2-seater, used as a target-tug & liaison aircraft.

=== Yugoslavia ===
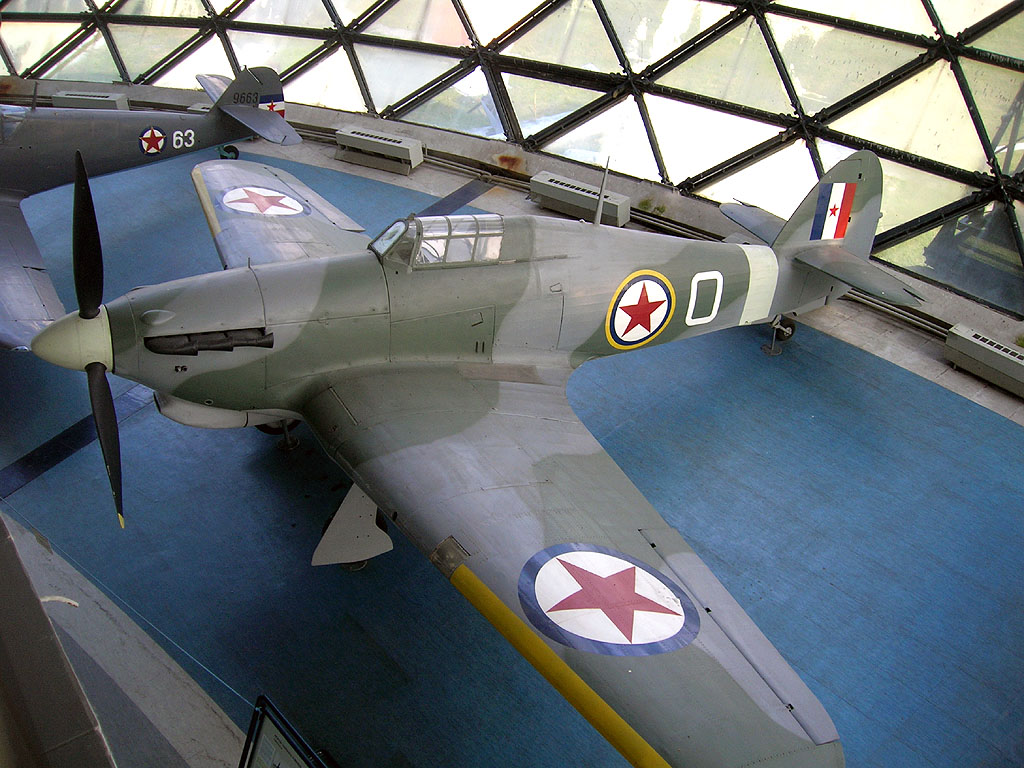
Hawker Hurricane Mk IVRP with Yugoslav Air Force markings, Museum of Aviation in Belgrade, Belgrade, Serbia

Zmaj factory built 20 Hurricanes under licence along with 24 examples delivered from Britain. After the war 16 aircraft were used by the SFR Yugoslav Air Force.

Yugoslav Royal Air Force

- No. 51 Squadron, 2 Lovacki Puk VVKJ
- No. 33 Squadron, 4 Lovacki Puk VVKJ
- No. 34 Squadron, 4 Lovacki Puk VVKJ

Yugoslav Squadrons in the RAF

- No. 351 Squadron RAF
- No. 352 Squadron RAF

SFR Yugoslav Air Force

- 1st Fighter Regiment (1945)
- Reconnaissance Aviation Regiment (1947–1948)
- 103rd Reconnaissance Aviation Regiment (1948–1951)

== Other users ==
=== Latvia ===
Latvian Aviation Regiment (Latvian Air Force)

In 1939, Latvia ordered and paid for 30 British Hawker Hurricane fighters, but due to the start of World War II later that year, they were never delivered.

== See also ==
- Hawker Hurricane
- Hawker Hurricane variants
