= 877 Naval Air Squadron =

Inactive flying squadron of the Royal Navy's Fleet Air Arm

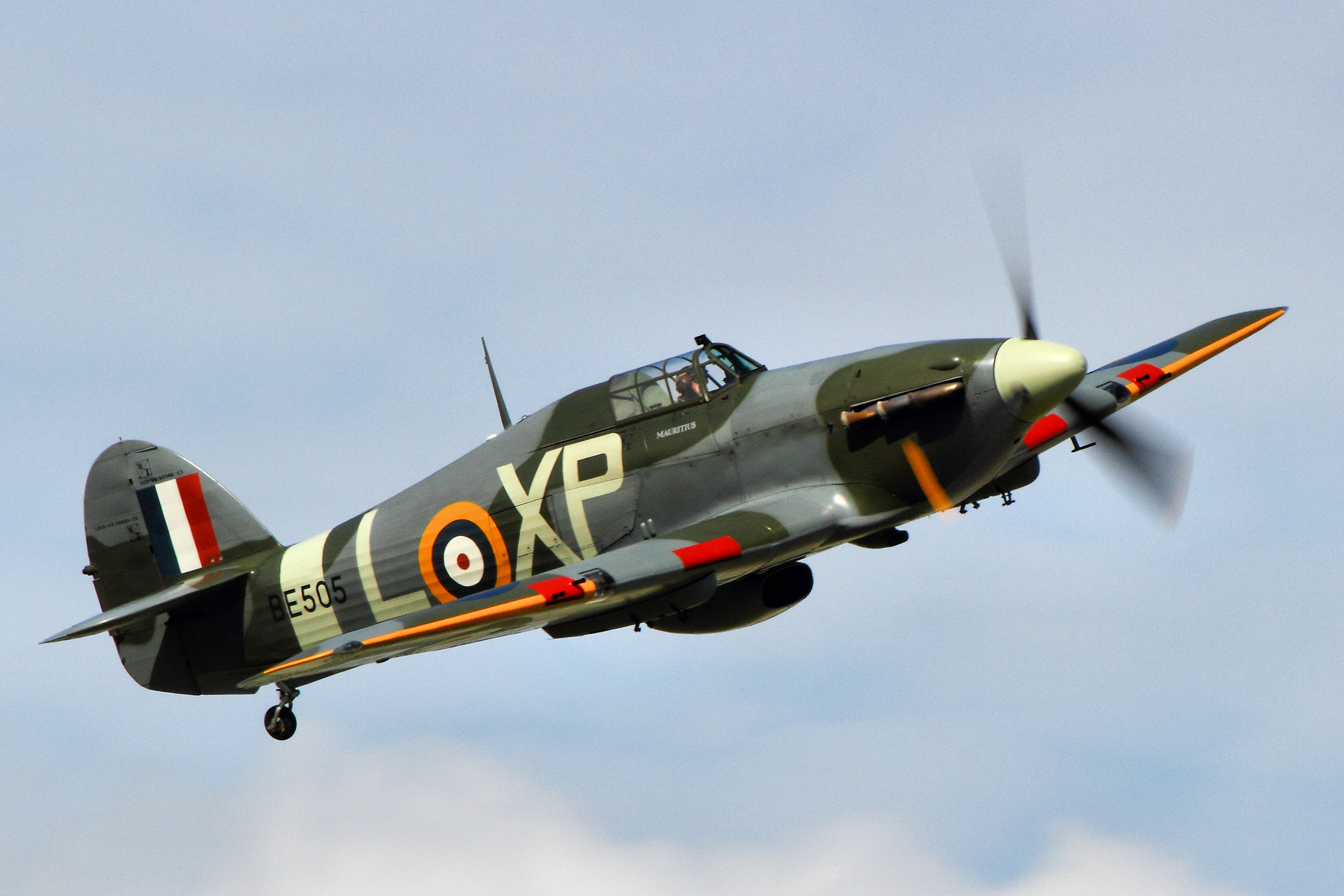
- Hawker Hurricane Mk IIB; an example of the type used by 877 NAS
- Active: 1943
- Disbanded: 30 December 1943
- Country: United Kingdom
- Branch: Royal Navy
- Type: Single-seat fighter squadron
- Role: Fleet fighter squadron
- Size: nine aircraft
- Part of: Fleet Air Arm
- Home station: See Naval air stations section for full list.

Aircraft flown
- Fighter: Hawker Hurricane

877 Naval Air Squadron (877 NAS), occasionally called 877 Squadron, is an inactive Fleet Air Arm (FAA) naval air squadron of the United Kingdom’s Royal Navy (RN). It was briefly active with Hurricane IIB fighter aircraft during 1943 in East Africa.

The squadron formed at Tanga, Tanganyika Territory in April 1943 as a Fleet Fighter unit for local defence duties, using RAF aircraft. In July 1943 the squadron moved to Port Reitz, Mombasa with the intention to fly with long-range fuel tanks to the defence of Ceylon but this was cancelled and the squadron disbanded in December 1943.

== History ==
=== Fleet fighter squadron (1943) ===
877 Naval Air Squadron was established at RNAS Tanga (HMS Kilele) (formerly Tanganyika, now Tanzania) in East Africa, on 1 April 1943, serving as a Fleet Fighter unit tasked with local defense operations. The squadron was equipped with nine long-range Royal Air Force (RAF) Hawker Hurricane IIB, fighter aircraft, which had been borrowed for this purpose. These aircraft were modified for anti-submarine patrols along the East African coast by being fitted with depth charges, necessitating the removal of their two outer .303 Browning machine guns to accommodate the additional weight.

In July, the relocation to RN Air Section Port Reitz, situated at RAF Port Reitz in Mombasa, Kenya, was intended to facilitate the aerial transport of the aircraft across the Indian Ocean to Ceylon, with the objective of strengthening the island's defense capabilities. However, this plan did not come to fruition. Ultimately, the squadron, which had a brief existence, was disbanded at RN Air Section Port Reitz on 30 December.

== Aircraft flown ==
877 Naval Air Squadron flew only one aircraft type:

- Hawker Hurricane Mk IIB fighter aircraft (April - December 1943)

== Naval air stations ==
877 Naval Air Squadron operated from a couple of naval air stations overseas:

- Royal Naval Air Station Tanga (HMS Kilele), Tanganyika (now Tanzania), (1 April - 6 July 1943)
- RN Air Section Port Reitz, Kenya, (6 July - 30 December 1943)
- disbanded - (30 December 1943)

== Commanding officers ==
List of commanding officers of 877 Naval Air Squadron with date of appointment:

- Captain P.P. Nelson-Gracie, RM, from 1 April 1943
- disbanded - 30 December 1943
