= No. 516 Squadron RAF =

- Active: 28 April 1943 – 2 December 1944
- Country: United Kingdom
- Branch: Royal Air Force
- Role: army co-operation
- Part of: No. 105 (Combined Operations) Wing RAF
- Base: RAF Dundonald

No. 516 Squadron RAF was an army co-operation squadron of the Royal Air Force during the Second World War.

== History ==
No. 516 Squadron was formed on 28 April 1943 at RAF Dundonald from 1441 (Combined Operations) Flight on 28 April 1943. Its role was to provide realistic training facilities to the Combined Operations Training Centre and other training units in the Western Scotland area. It operated a large variety of aircraft with the unusual task to provide realistic low-level attacks against commando and assault troops undergoing training. The work involved detaching aircraft near the troop training areas including RAF Ayr and RAF Haverfordwest. By 1944 the training of commando and assault troops was on the decline and the squadron was disbanded at Dundonald on 2 December 1944.

No squadron codes are known to have been carried between April 1943 and Dec 1944.

== Aircraft operated ==
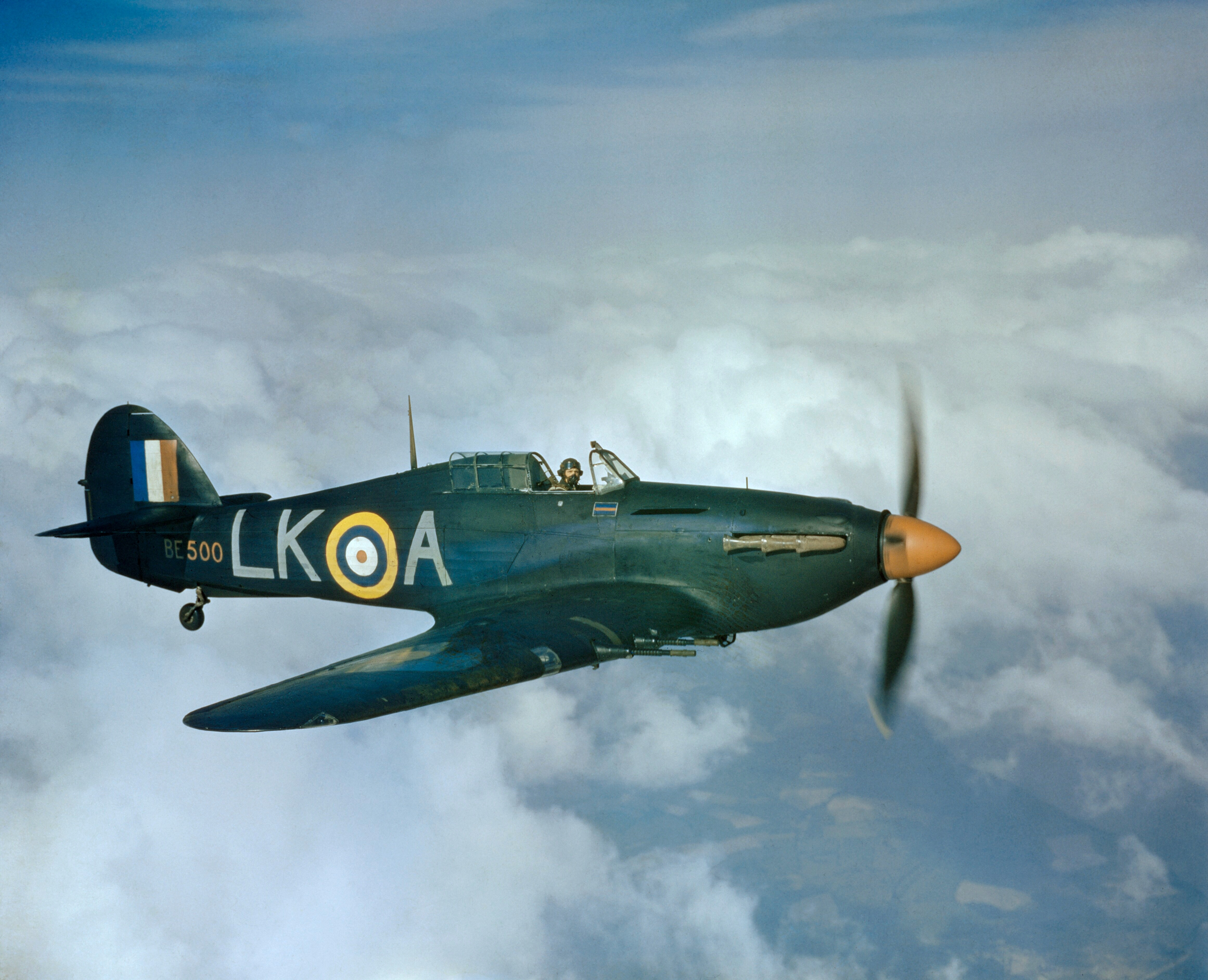
Hawker Hurricane IIC

Aircraft operated by no. 516 Squadron RAF, data from
From	To	Aircraft	Version
April 1943	December 1943	Westland Lysander	Mks.II, IIIa
April 1943	February 1944	North American Mustang	Mk.I
April 1943	December 1944	Avro Anson	Mk.I
May 1943	December 1944	Bristol Blenheim	Mk.IV
December 1943	December 1944	Hawker Hurricane	Mks.IIb, IIc

== See also ==
- List of Royal Air Force aircraft squadrons
