= Hawker Hurricane variants =

The Hawker Hurricane was a British single-seat fighter aircraft designed and predominantly built by Hawker Aircraft. Some models were built in Canada by Canadian Car and Foundry.

== British variants ==
=== Hurricane Mk I ===
==== Hurricane Mk I (Early production) ====
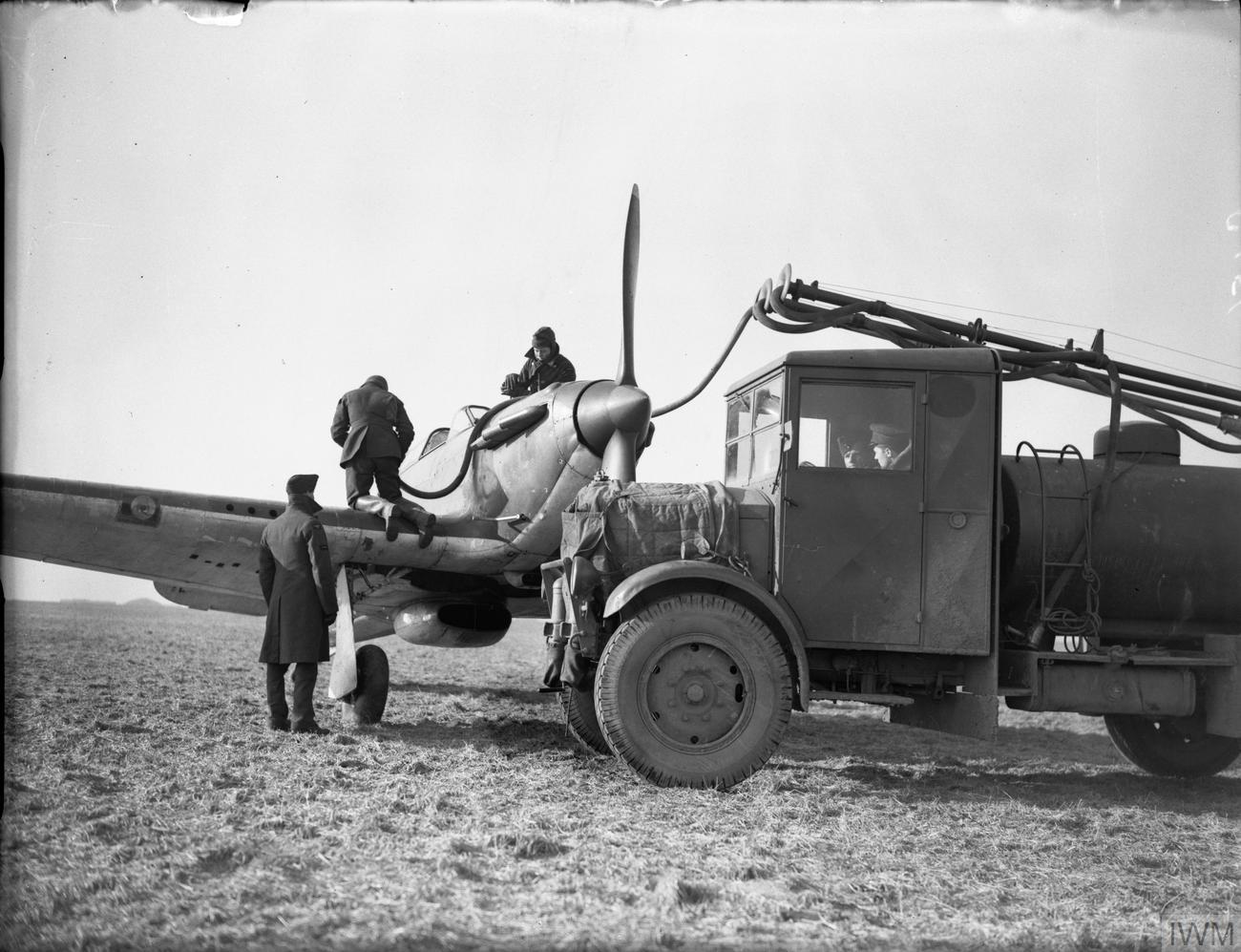
Mk I with original two-bladed propeller, in France circa 1939

The first Mark I production machines were ready fairly quickly, with deliveries starting in December 1937. These early aircraft featured fabric-covered wings, and a wooden, two bladed, fixed pitch propeller. Initially, the tailwheel was designed to be retractable. Early on it was discovered that the Hurricane needed a larger rudder area to improve the control characteristics during a spin. To this end, the lower part of the rudder was extended and a distinctive ventral "keel" was added to the rear fuselage. The tailwheel was fixed in place.

Early Hurricanes lacked armour or self-sealing tanks. They used "ring and bead" gunsights, with the ring being mounted above the instrument panel and the bead mounted on a post above the engine cowling. The standard GM2 reflector gunsight was introduced in mid-1939, although many Hurricanes retained the "bead". Fuel capacity was 97 Imperial gallons (441 L) in two fuel tanks, each of 34.5 gal (157 L) in the wing centre-section held between the spars. The fuel was pumped from these into a reserve gravity-feed tank which held an additional 28 gal (127 L) in the forward fuselage, just ahead of the cockpit. This was the main fuel feed to the engine. The 7 gal (32 L) oil tank was built into the forward, port centre section. Early "K" serialled Mk I models were powered by the 1,029 horsepower (768 kW) Rolls-Royce Merlin C engine; from the "L" serial numbers the later Merlin II with 1,030 hp (768 kW) was installed. The main coolant radiator was housed in a fairing under the rear wing centre-section; the oil cooler was also incorporated into the main radiator.

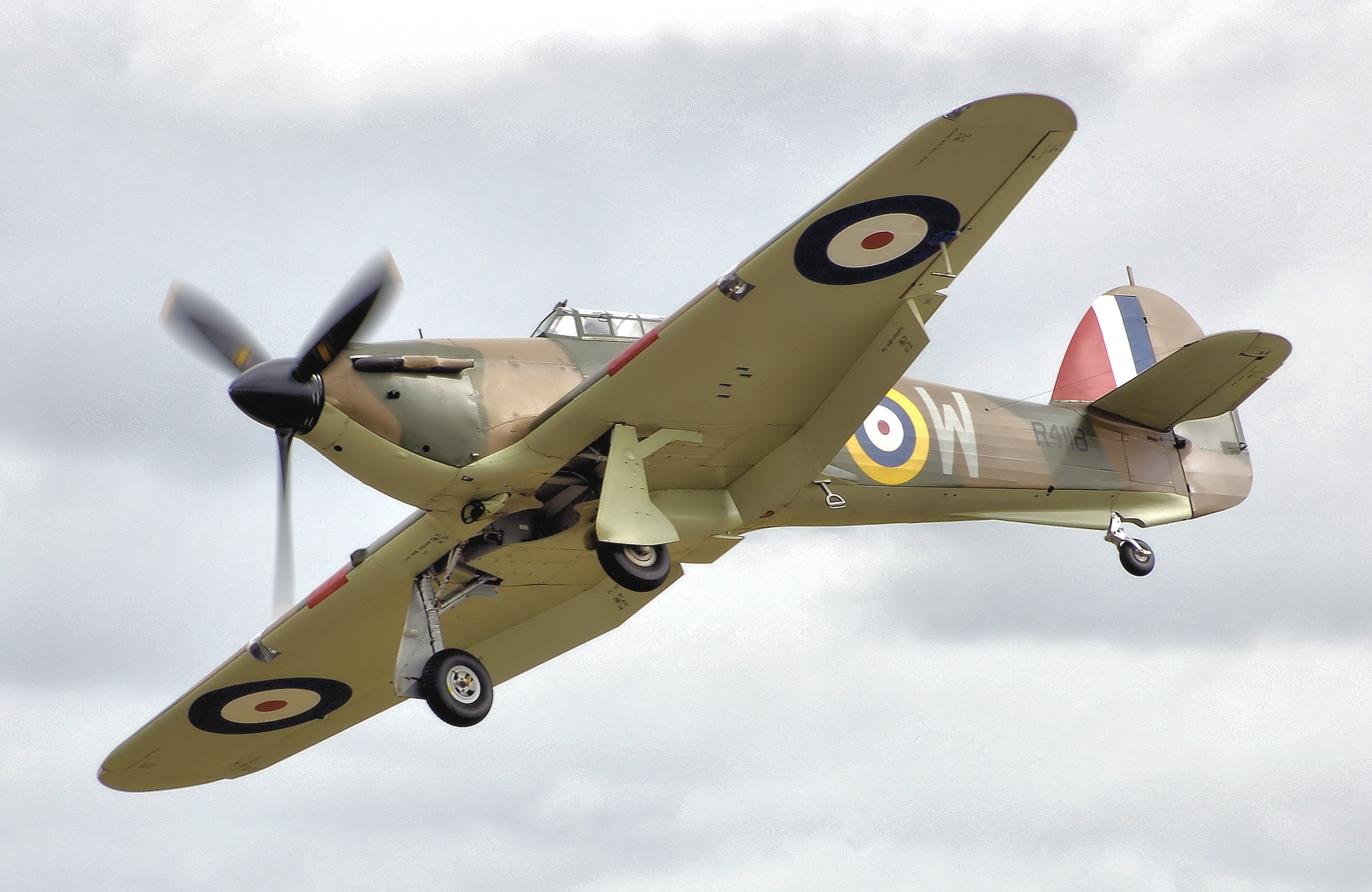
Hurricane Mk.I R4118 is the only Hurricane from the 1940 Battle of Britain still flying

The aircraft handling qualities during take-off and landings were deemed excellent due to a wide-track undercarriage with relatively wide low-pressure tyres. Because of this wide, stable platform, the Hurricane was an easier aircraft to land, with less fear of nose-overs or "ground-loops" than its RAF Fighter Command counterpart the Supermarine Spitfire. During its operational life, the Hurricane was able to operate from all sorts of adverse airfield surfaces with ease.

Large, thick wings meant that the fighter proved to be a stable gun platform. It was armed with eight .303 in (7.7 mm) Browning machine guns arranged in groups of four in two large gun bays incorporated into the outer wing panels. In 1937 this firepower was enough to outgun the early marks of German Messerschmitt Bf 109, which were equipped with only four light machine guns. By the time of the Battle of Britain, it was recognised that this relatively small-calibre armament was inadequate; during the Battle of Britain it was relatively common for Luftwaffe aircraft to survive numerous hits from .303 in (7.7 mm) bullets and still return safely to base. Later versions of the Hurricane were equipped with 12 .303 in (7.7 mm) Brownings, and later four 20 mm (.79 in) Hispano cannons. Hurricanes built under licence by SABCA in Belgium had four 12.7 mm (.50 in) FN-Browning guns instead of the .303 inch armament.

==== Hurricane Mk I (Mid-late production) ====
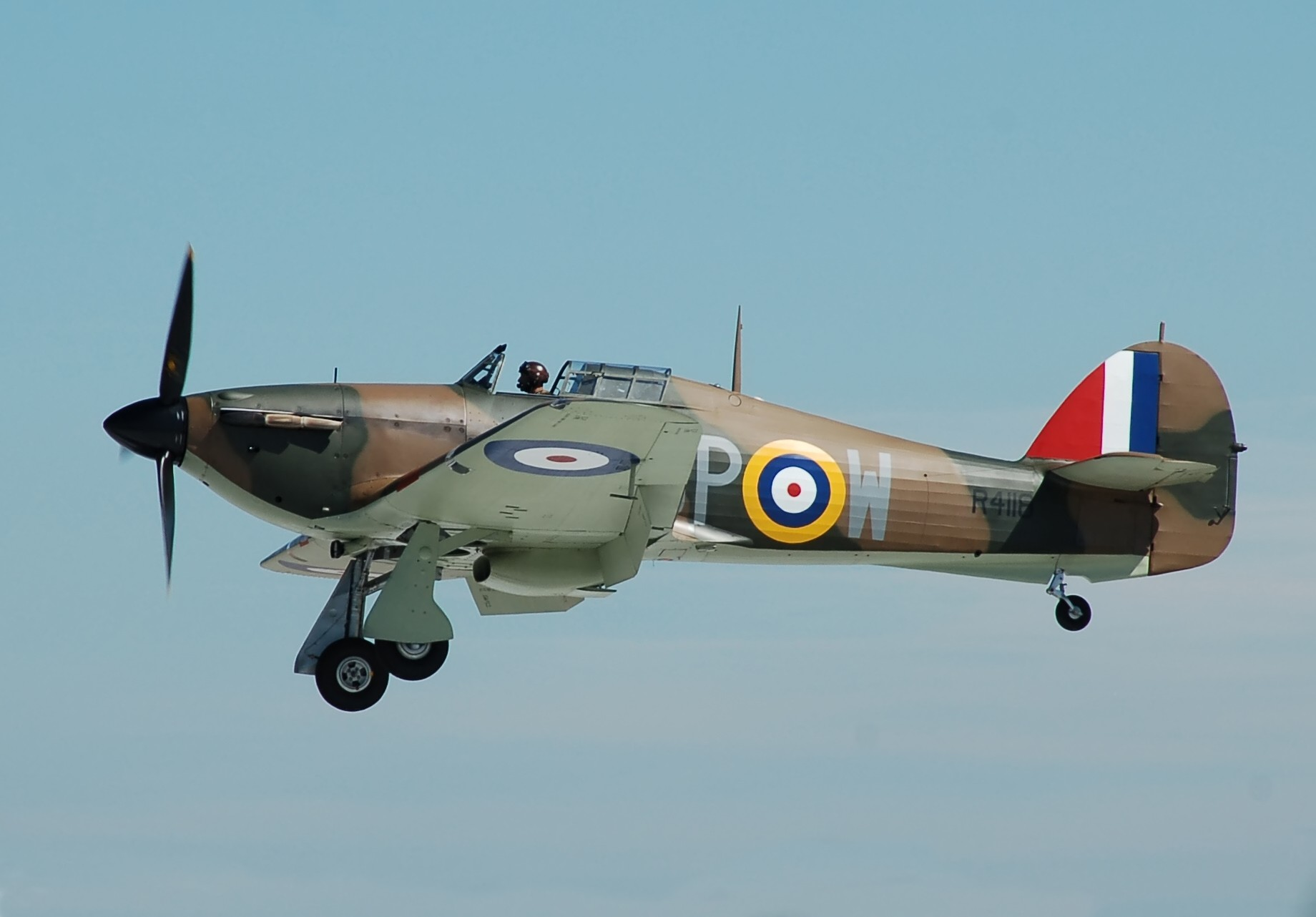
Another view of Hurricane I (R4118), a typical Battle of Britain style Mk I with a de Havilland propeller unit

In 1939, several changes were made to the Hurricane. The powerplant was changed to the Merlin III driving a de Havilland or Rotol constant speed metal propeller. Ejector exhaust stacks were fitted for added thrust. The fabric-covered wings were replaced by re-stressed metal-covered wings. An armour-glass panel was incorporated on the front of the windscreen. The "rod" aerial mast was replaced by a streamlined, tapered design.

From about May 1940, 70 lb (32 kg) of armour plate protection was added in the form of head and back armour. Starting in September 1940, IFF equipment was installed. This weighed about 40 lb (18 kg) and could be identified by wire aerials strung between the tailplane tips and rear fuselage. Although the added weight and the aerials reduced maximum speed by about 2 mph (3.2 km/h) it allowed the aircraft to be identified as "friendly" on radar. Lack of such equipment was a factor leading to the Battle of Barking Creek. At about the same time new VHF T/R Type 1133 radios started replacing the HF TR9 sets. The pilots enjoyed a much clearer reception, which was a big advantage with the adoption of Wing formations throughout the RAF in 1941. The new installation meant that the wire running between the aerial mast and rudder could be removed, as could the triangular "prong" on the mast.

At the start of the war, the engine ran on the standard 87 octane aviation spirit. From March 1940 increasing quantities of 100 octane fuel, imported from the British-controlled refineries and the US, became available. This meant that during the defensive battles over Dunkirk the Hurricane Mk I benefited from an allowable increase in supercharger "boost" from 6 to 12 lb (2.7 to 5.4 kg) without damaging the engine. With the 12 lb "emergency boost", the Merlin III was able to generate 1,305 hp (973 kW) in a five-minute burst. If the pilot resorted to emergency boost, he had to report this on landing and it had to be noted in the engine log book.

In 1939, the RAF had taken on about 500 aircraft of this later design to form the backbone of the fighter squadrons during the Battle of France and into the Battle of Britain. The first RAF ace of the war, a young New Zealander known as Cobber Kain, flew a Hurricane with 73 Squadron. In June 1940, another wartime ace, Douglas Bader, was promoted to Squadron Leader and took command of 242 (Canadian) Squadron flying Hurricane Mk Is. The children's author Roald Dahl also flew Hurricanes with 80 Squadron in Greece and later in Syria, against the Germans and Vichy France.

===== Comparative aircraft =====
Although some of the basic design elements of the aircraft were from an earlier generation, the Hurricane proved to be a match, to an extent, for the German Messerschmitt Bf 109E. In his book, Duel of Eagles, British ace Peter Townsend, who flew Hurricanes with 85 Squadron during the Battle of Britain, provides examples demonstrating how the Hurricane's superior turning ability could offset the Bf 109's higher speed. This small turning circle often allowed a well-flown Hurricane to get onto the tail of a 109 even more quickly than a Spitfire. Working against the Hurricane was the aircraft's relatively slow acceleration and a top speed some 10–30 mph (16–48 km/h) slower, depending on altitude. This meant that the 109 pilot often held the initiative when it came to breaking off or attacking during combat. At higher altitudes especially, the Hurricane was hard-pressed to keep up with a well-flown 109, or even a Bf 110.

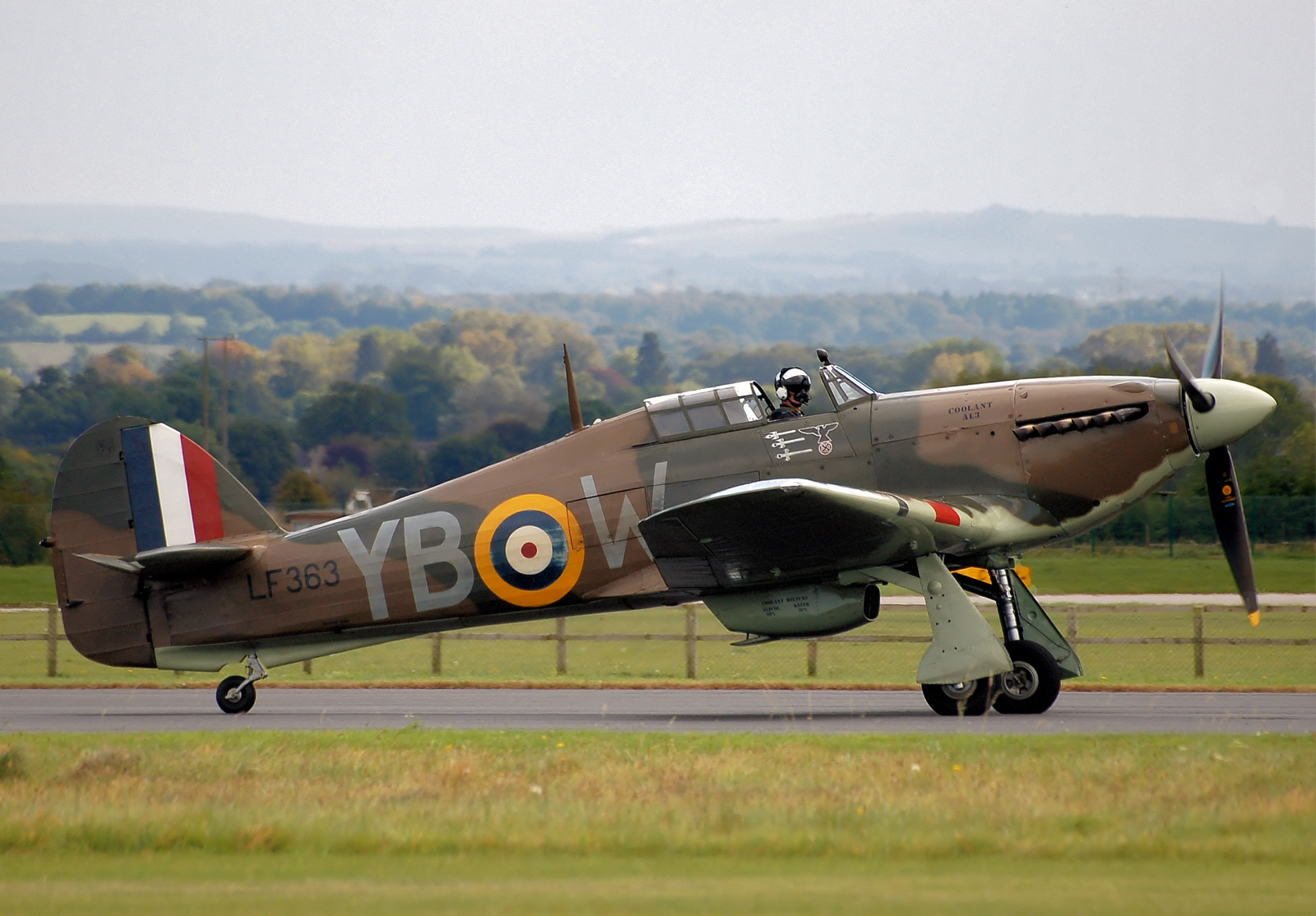
Battle of Britain Memorial Flight Hurricane IIC (LF363)

Lower down the situation was a little more even. The Merlin engine gave more power at low altitude than the Daimler-Benz DB 601 (DB601A-1) used in the Bf 109, on account of a different supercharger design. The DB601A-1 did not start to outperform the Merlin III and XII until above 15,000 ft (4,600 m). The Merlin's only serious drawback was a tendency to cut out during negative-g manoeuvres and inverted flight, on account of fuel starvation from the carburettor. This was temporarily fixed with "Miss Shilling's orifice", a simple modification. A direct-injection carburettor later solved the problem and eventually, some versions of the Merlin used direct fuel injection.

When attacking Luftwaffe bombers, it was discovered that the Hurricane's fuel tanks were vulnerable to defensive machine gun fire. The greatest hazard was with the unprotected gravity-feed fuel tank in front of the cockpit which could rupture when hit, allowing a jet of flame to penetrate the cockpit through the instrument panel, causing serious burns to the pilot. The wooden and fabric rear fuselage was also far more likely to catch fire than the metal fuselages of its contemporaries. This issue was of such concern to Air Vice Marshal Hugh Dowding that he had Hawker retrofit the fuselage tanks of Hurricanes with a fire-resistant material called "Linatex" as a matter of priority. The wing tanks had already been fitted with a covering of this sealant, but the fuselage tank was considered to be too small a target. Hurricanes were soon being modified at the rate of 75 per month. In one month of combat, 10 July 1940 to 11 August, defensive fire from bombers hit 25 Hurricanes and 25 Spitfires; as a result, 11 Hurricanes were shot down compared to two Spitfires.

The biggest advantages of the Hurricane were that it was a relatively easy aircraft to fly, which was a boon when it came to squadrons being flooded with inexperienced pilots, and it was a steady gun platform. The closely grouped .303 in (7.7 mm) Brownings created a superior pattern of fire to those of the Spitfire, which were spaced out along the wings, and the armament was more quickly serviced. In spite of its vulnerabilities during the Battle of Britain, the Hurricane shot down the majority of the planes claimed by the RAF (1,593 out of 2,739 in total). Hurricanes were sometimes directed against slower bombers whilst the Spitfires attacked German fighters. By the close of the Battle of Britain in late 1940, production of the Spitfire had increased to the point where all squadrons could be supplied with them. In June 1940, the first Hurricane Mk I "Tropical" versions appeared. These featured a Vokes air filter in a large "chin" fairing under the engine cowling. Many of these aircraft were ferried to North Africa and Malta via France and the Mediterranean using fixed, cylindrical 40-gallon fuel tanks under each wing to extend the range. The tropical filter and fuel tanks were to be used on later variants of the Hurricane.

=== Hurricane Mk II ===
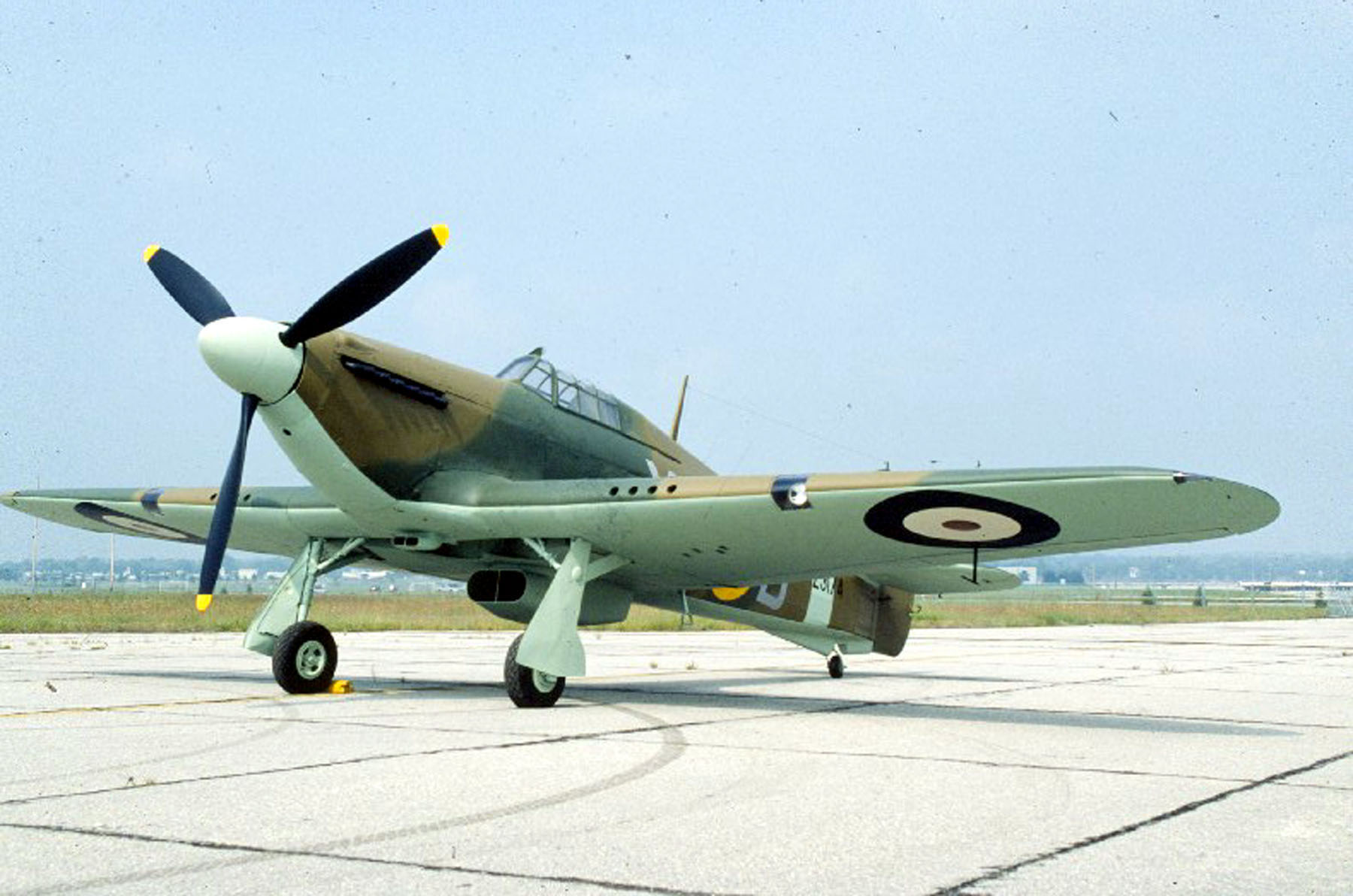
Hawker Hurricane IIA at the National Museum of the United States Air Force

The improved Merlin XX (Mk.20) engine appeared in 1940 featuring a new two-speed supercharger that could have its impeller speed changed by the pilot depending on the outside air pressure (altitude). At about 18,000 feet (5,500 m) (effective), it would be switched to a higher speed gearing ("FS ratio" – Full Supercharge) for added compression, while below that, at its lower speed gearing, ("MS ratio" – Moderate Supercharge), it "robbed" less power from the engine. The result was more power at both lower and higher altitudes, dramatically increasing the overall performance of the engine with it peaking at 1,280 horsepower (950 kW). Because of the new engine, the bay immediately in front of the cockpit was lengthened by 4 inches (100 mm). The carburettor air intake under the forward centre-section was redesigned and moved back 3 inches (76 mm). The more powerful engine was cooled by a 70% to 30% water glycol mix, rather than pure glycol used for earlier Merlin versions. This and the increased cooling requirements required a larger radiator and a redesigned, circular oil cooler housed in a deeper, slightly wider "bath".

==== Hurricane IIA Series 1 ====
Although, by this time, production of the Spitfire had started to increase, a prototype of a Merlin XX-powered Hurricane Mk I was built and first flew on 11 June 1940. The initial Mark II is often known as by the unofficial designation Mark IIA Series 1, while later Mark IIs had their wing centre sections strengthened. The Mark II went into squadron service in September 1940 at the peak of the Battle of Britain. Hawker had long experimented with improving the armament of the fighter by fitting cannons. Their first experiments used two 20 mm (0.79 in) Oerlikon cannons in pods, one under each wing, (one aircraft was tested during 1940 with 151 Squadron) but the extra weight and drag seriously compromised the aircraft's performance and manoeuvrability, and the limited amount of ammunition carried coupled with the frequent stoppages suffered by the drum-fed guns, meant the arrangement was unsatisfactory. A more reliable fit was made with four 20 mm (0.79 in) Hispano Mk II cannon, two in each wing, but the weight was enough to seriously reduce performance. The Hispanos were designed for a rigid, engine-based mounting and it was quickly found that the wings flexing in flight led to problems with the weapons twisting in their mounts as they fired, which caused gun jamming through misaligned shells. Changes made both to the Hispanos and to their mountings cured this problem. Small blisters on the upper wing surfaces were needed to clear the Hispano breeches and feed motors. The first sets of Hispano wings were modified from standard Mark I eight gun wings.

==== Hurricane IIB ====
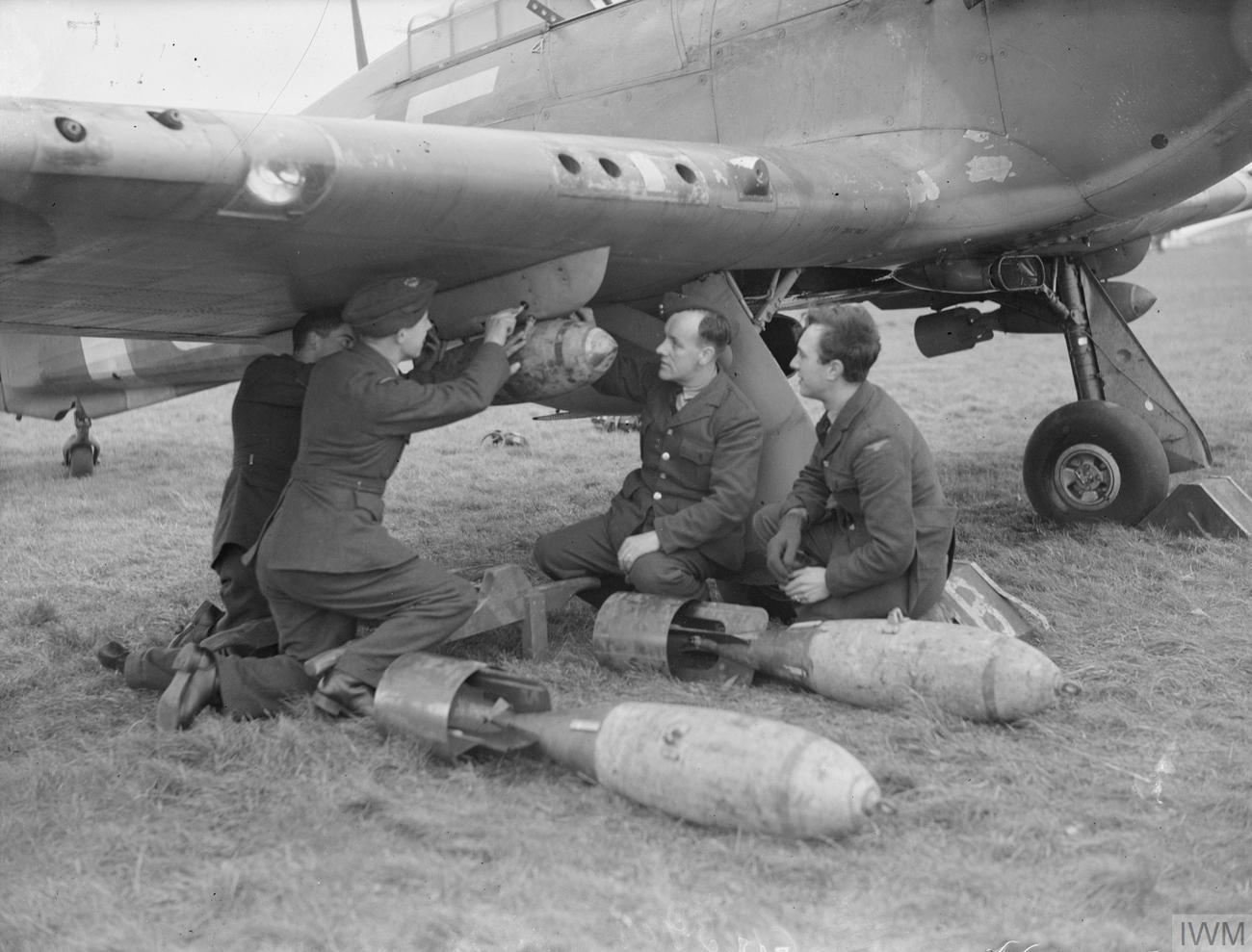
Mk IIB showing six machine guns on right wing

Trials with 12 .303 in (7.7 mm) Brownings (four per wing in the original gun-bays and two more in new gun-bays outboard of the landing lights) were done in June and July 1940, production began at Hawker and Austin in February 1941. These aircraft also featured a new longer propeller spinner. The tailwheel recess on the ventral keel was changed in shape and the tailwheel leg became a levered-suspension unit with a small torque link.

==== Hurricane IIB Trop. ====
For use in North Africa; the Hawker Hurricane IIB, (and other aircraft), were tropicalised, or "trop". They were given engine dust filters and the pilots were issued a desert survival kit.

==== Hurricane IIC ====
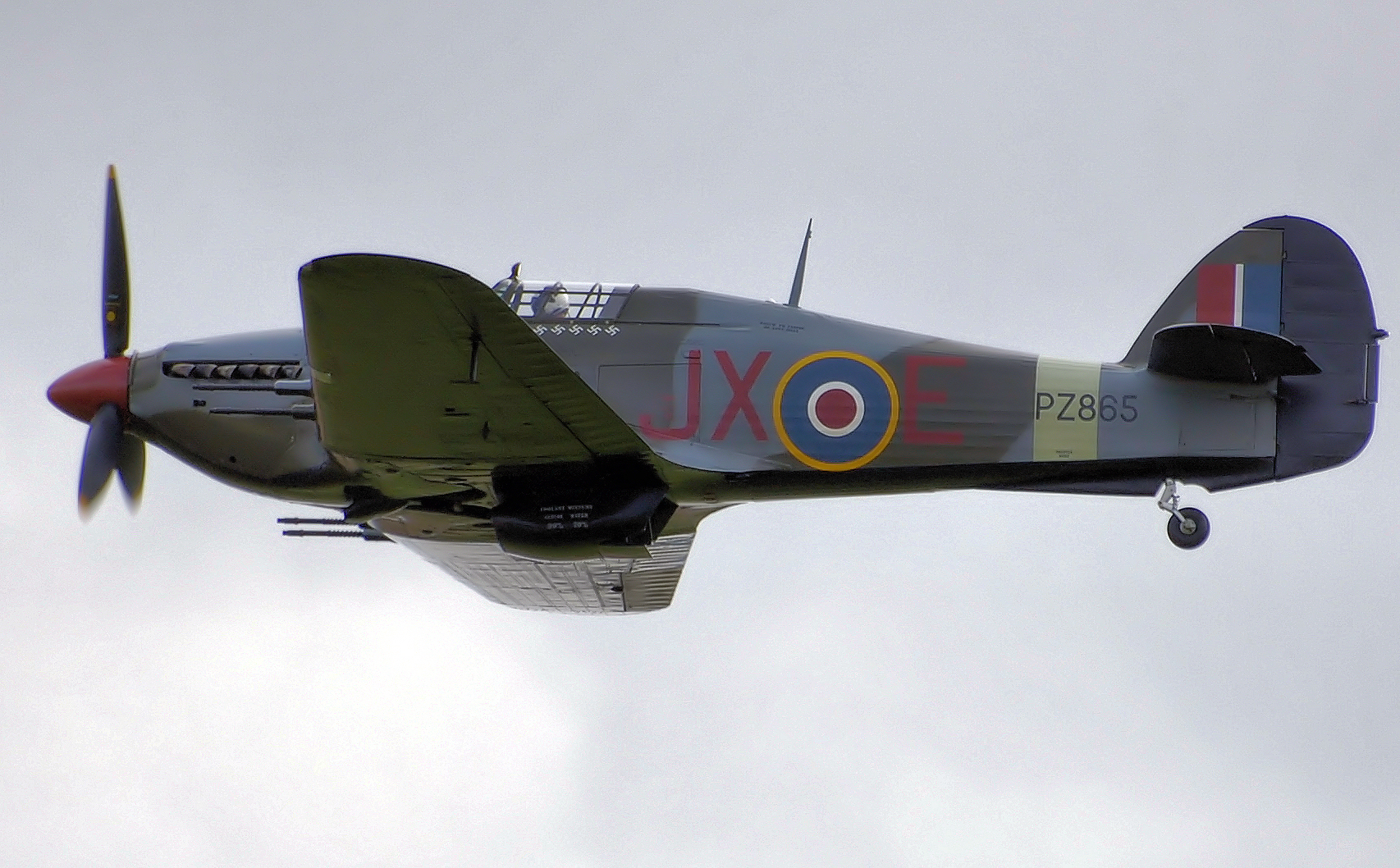
Hawker Hurricane Mk IIc PZ865, 'The Last of the Many', which was built in July 1944.

The Hurricane Mk II armed with four 20 mm (0.79 in) Hispanos became the Mark IIC, using a slightly modified wing. Trials with a pair of external cannons as armament had begun in May 1939, then the internal arrangement in June to August 1940. In November 1940 thirty sets of Hurricane IIC (Four cannon) wings were built by semi-tooled and hand methods in the experimental shop, using wings damaged in the region of the gun bay.

Test flights with external fuel tanks began in May 1940, the first Mark II trials in June 1941. Test flights carrying bombs began in April 1941, the first Mark II trials with 500 lb (230 kg) bombs were in February 1942, most Mark II were built as able or converted to carry external stores. By then performance was inferior to the latest German fighters, and the Hurricane changed to ground-attack, sometimes referred to as the Hurribomber. The Mark also served as a night fighter and "intruder". The last Hurricane built was a Mark IIC, serial number PZ865.

==== Hurricane T IIC ====
The T Mk IIC was a dedicated two-seat training version of the Mk. IIC created by Hawker in 1946. Although a successful design, only two aircraft were built for the Imperial Iranian Air Force.

==== Hurricane IID ====
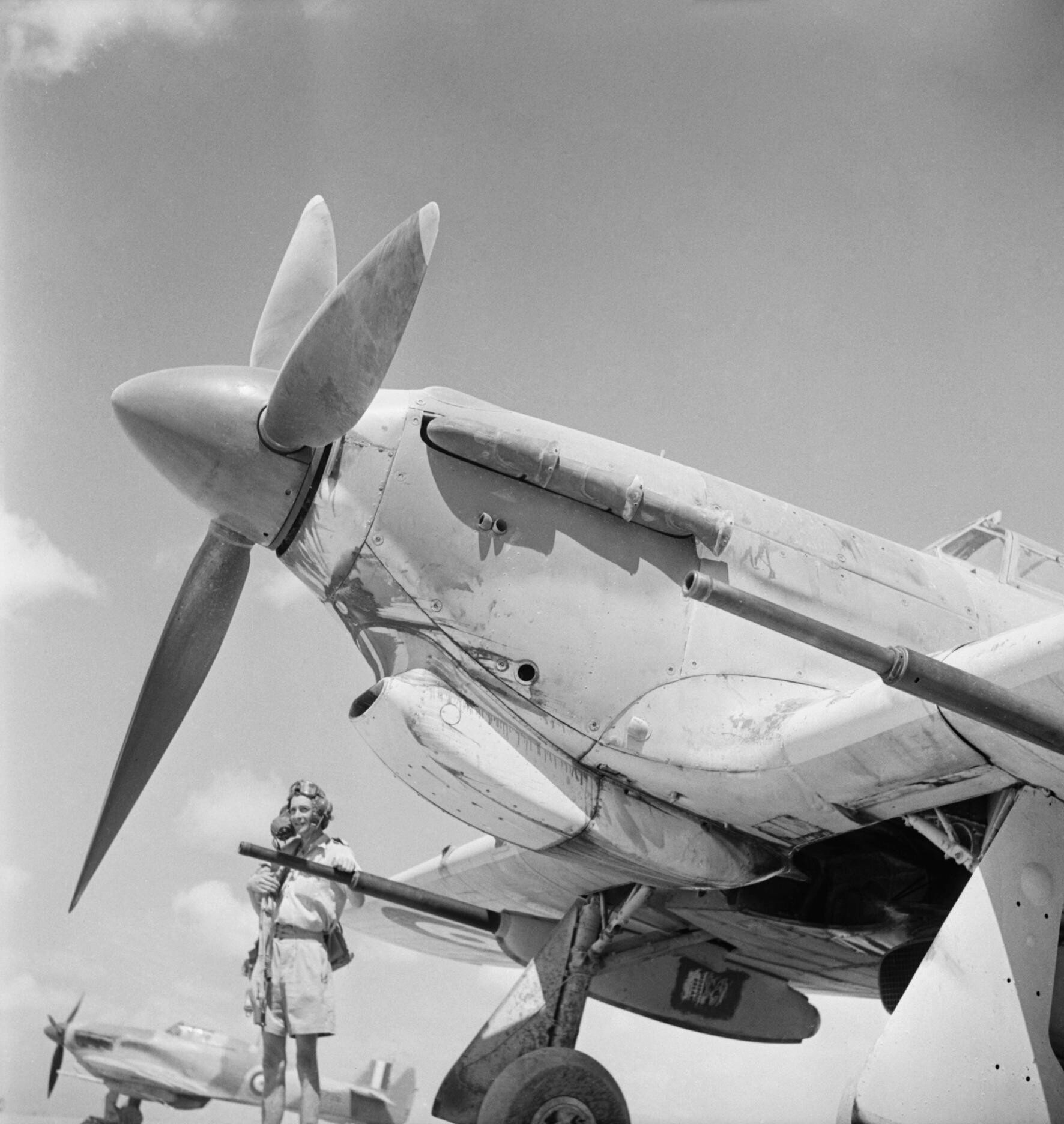
A Mark IID Hurricane of 6 Squadron at Shandur, Egypt (1942)

Mk IIs were used in ground support, where it was quickly learned that destroying German tanks was difficult. The cannons did not have the performance needed, while bombing the tanks was almost impossible. The solution was to equip the aircraft with a 40 mm cannon in a pod under each wing, reducing the other armament to a single Browning in each wing loaded with tracers for aiming purposes. The Hurricanes of No. 6 Squadron, the first squadron equipped with this armament, were so effective that the squadron was nicknamed the "Flying Can Openers". A winged can-opener became an unofficial squadron emblem, and is painted on present-day aircraft of 6 Squadron.

The layout was originally tested on a converted Mk IIB and flew on 18 September 1941. A new-build version of what was known as the Mk IID started in January 1942, including additional armour for the pilot, radiator and engine. The aircraft were initially supplied with a Rolls-Royce gun and carried 12 rounds, but soon changed to the 40 mm (1.57 in) Vickers S gun with 15 rounds. The weight of guns and armour protection had a marginal effect on the aircraft's performance.

The IID was used in anti-tank operations in limited numbers during the North African campaign where, provided enemy flak and fighters were absent, they proved accurate and highly effective against armoured vehicles and all motor transport.

==== Hurricane IIE ====
The Mk IIE. This designation was used by parts of the RAF in 1941 (starting with BE221 in September) and then the Ministry of Aircraft Production in 1942 for Mark II factory fitted with wing racks, 270 delivered according to the Ministry, 230 IIB and 40 IIC, the RAF used the Mk IIBB or IICB designation to denote racks fitted. The Mk IIE was NOT an early mark Mk IV.

=== Hurricane Mk III ===
The Mk III was a Mk II equipped with a Packard-built Merlin engine, intending to provide supplies of the British-built engines for other designs. By the time production was to have started, British Merlin production had increased to the point where the idea was abandoned.

=== Hurricane Mk IV ===
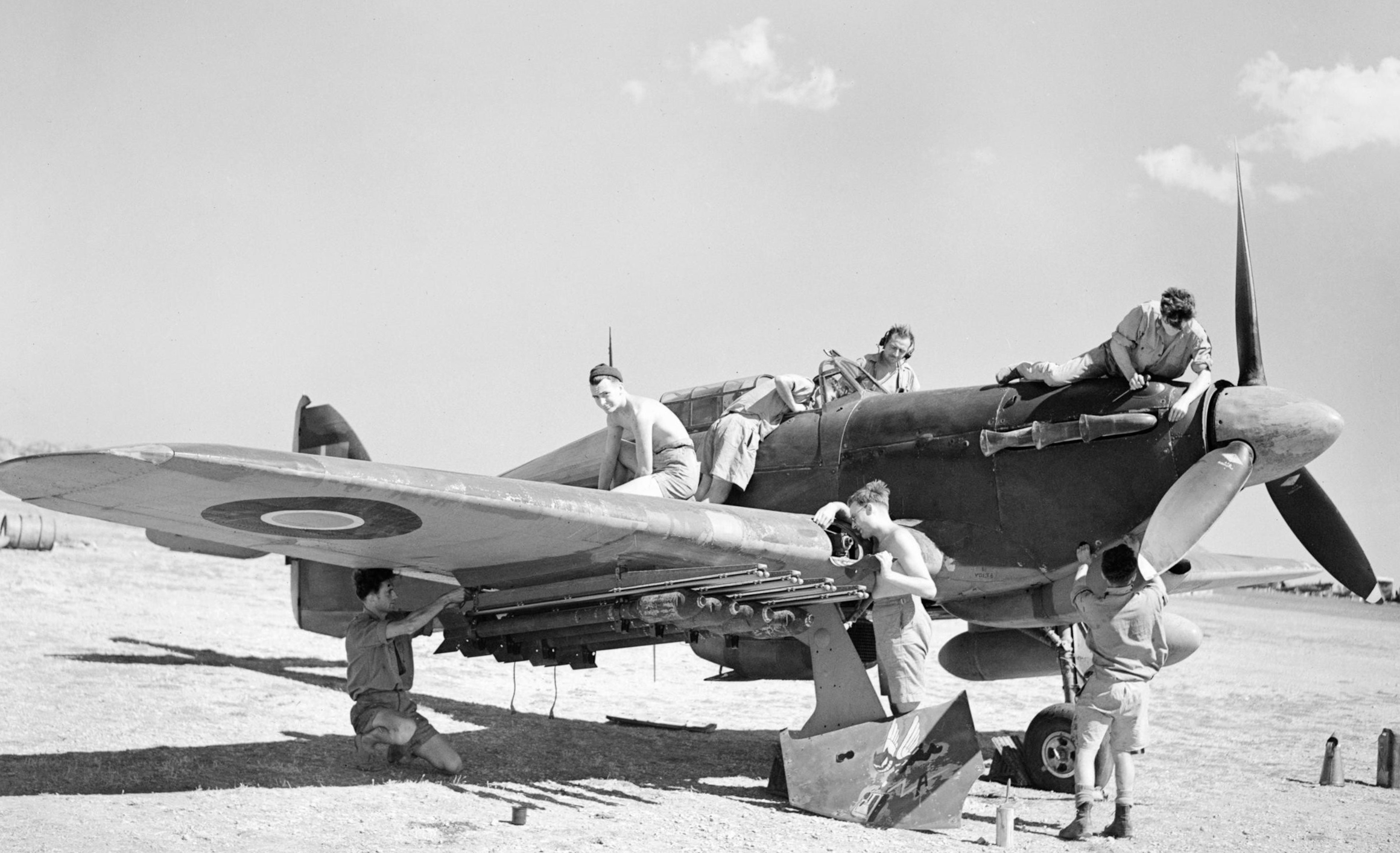
Hurricane Mk IV at Foggia, Italy, July 1944, armed with RP-3 rockets

The Mk IV. The last major change to the Hurricane was to "rationalise" the wing, configuring it with a single design able to mount two 250 or 500 lb (110 or 230 kg) bombs, two 40 mm (1.57 in) Vickers S guns, two 40 mm (1.57 in) Rolls-Royce B.H. type guns, two SBC (small bomb containers), SCI (smoke curtain installation), two 45 or 90 gallon drop tanks, or eight "60 pounder" RP-3 rockets. Some sources say that the new design also mounted the improved Merlin 24 or 27 engines of 1,620 hp (1,208 kW) but the RAF Form 78 shows otherwise. All Merlin 27 were modified to Merlin 25 and used in Mosquitoes. There were only 16 production Merlin 24 by the time over 300 Mark IV had been delivered and despite many Hurricane IV exports Merlin 24 exports were rare, and in accordance with the overseas Avro York fleet. The individual aircraft cards held by the RAF museum reports the final Mark IV had a Merlin XX. Mark IV loss reports note the engine as Merlin XX.

They were equipped with dust filters for desert operations and an additional 350 lb (159 kg) of armour plating was added to the radiator housing, cockpit, and fuel tanks.

The Mk IV was used in ground-attack missions in the European theatre until the early days of 1944, before being replaced by the more modern Hawker Typhoon.

=== Hurricane Mk V ===
One prototype and another two Hurricane Mk Vs were built as conversions of Mk IVs, and featured a Merlin 27 engine driving a four-bladed propeller, also tested with a Merlin 32. The ground attack role moved to the more capable Hawker Typhoon.

By this time, the Hurricane was no longer a frontline fighter in the United Kingdom. However, it still saw extensive service overseas as a fighter, playing a prominent role in the Middle East and Far East. It was also critical to the defence of Malta during 1941 and early 1942.

== Canadian production ==
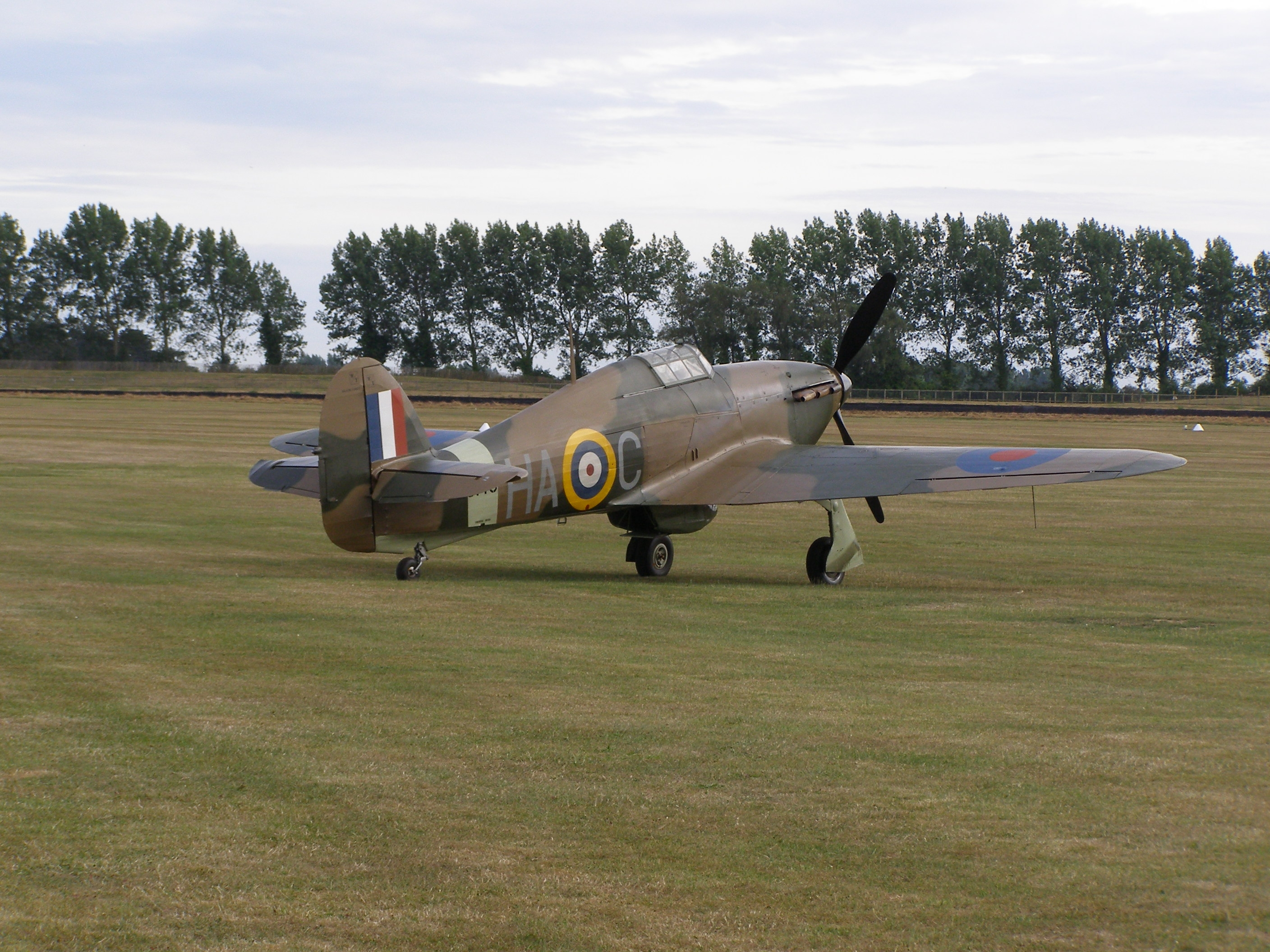
Canadian-built Hurricane Mk XII painted to represent Hurricane IIB Z5140 of 126 Squadron RAF

Hurricane Mk X Some production of the Hurricane was carried out in Canada by Canadian Car and Foundry. Single-seat fighter and fighter-bomber. Mark X is used by some RAF documentation to describe Canadian-built Mark I but was not an official designation. By the time Merlin 28 production began in the US 419 Canadian-built Mark I airframes had arrived in Britain. Ultimately only 234 Canadian-built Hurricanes arrived in Britain with an engine fitted, and they were quickly removed and fitted to Lancasters.

Hurricane Mk XI A mark number never allocated, while many references use it to describe the 150 Hurricanes shipped to Britain from the Canadian order for 400.

Hurricane Mk XII Originally designated the Mark IIB (Can), it was changed to Mark XII in April 1943. The Mk XII was a single-seat fighter-bomber. Powered by a 1,300 hp (969 kW) Packard Merlin 29. Armed with twelve 0.303 in (7.7 mm) machine guns.

Hurricane Mk XIIA These aircraft were the survivors of 30 Hurricane Mk I transferred to the Royal Canadian Air Force and upgraded to use the Merlin 29. Armed with eight 0.303 in (7.7 mm) machine guns.

== Sea Hurricanes ==
Fifty Sea Hurricane Mk I aircraft were built by Canadian Car and Foundry and 60 Sea Hurricane Mk IIC aircraft were built by Hawker. The RAF aircraft census as of end February 1943 reported 50 Sea Hurricane I built, 378 converted, 36 out of an order for 60 Sea Hurricane IIC built. A further 29 Mark I, 52 IIB and 30 IIC were with the Admiralty. RAF census as of the end June 1944 reported 50 Sea Hurricane I built, 378 converted, 60 Sea Hurricane IIC built. A further 19 Mark I, 51 IIB and 76 IIC were with the Admiralty. Ray Sturtivant with Mick Burrow identify the following Hurricanes as having served: 101 Mk I, 3 Mk IIA, 30 Mk IIB, 90 Mk IIC, 1 Mk IV, 16 Mk Sea Ia, 281 Mk Sea Ib, 2 Mk Sea IIb, 109 Mk Sea IIc and possibly others.

=== Sea Hurricane Mk IA ===
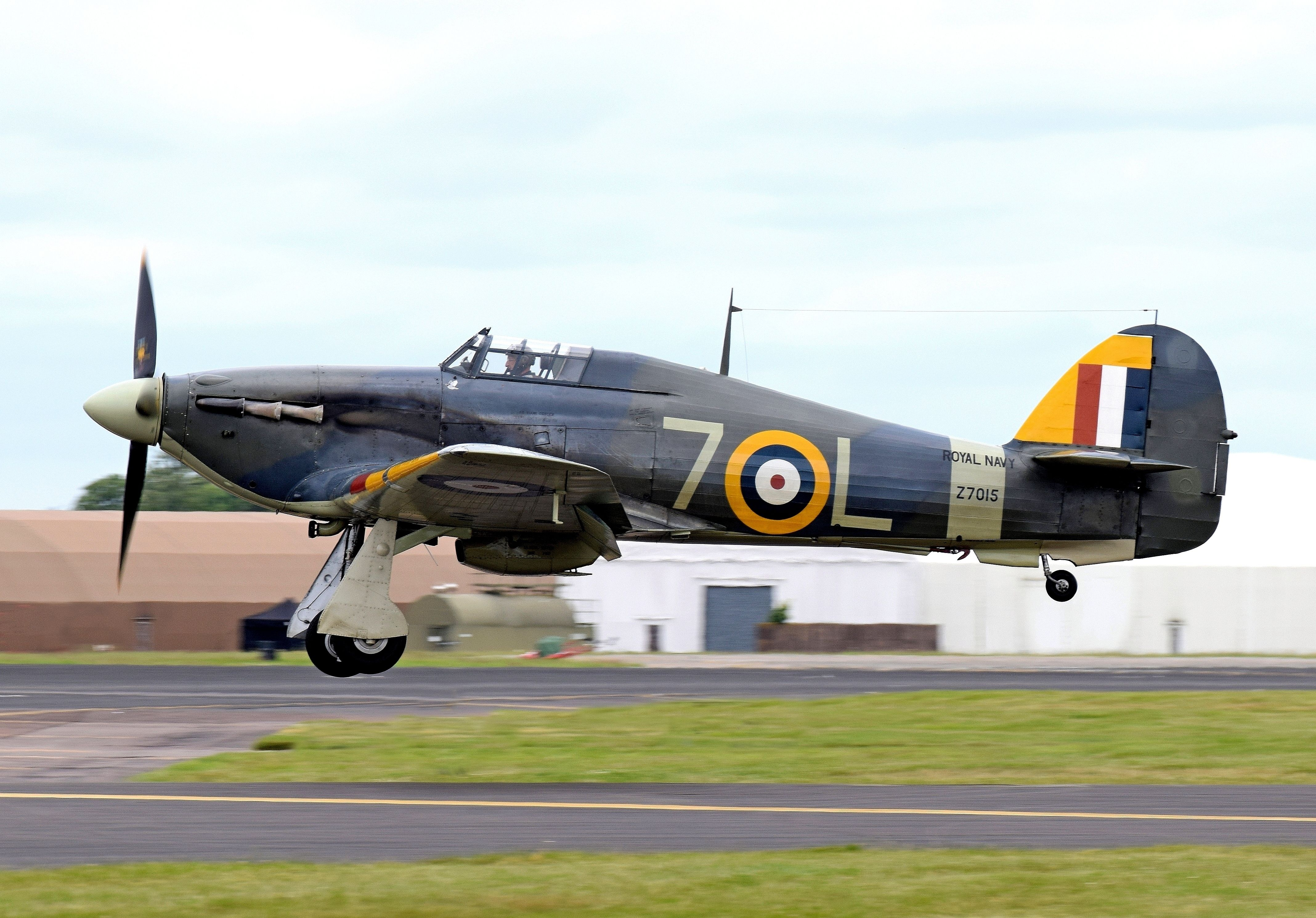
Hawker Sea Hurricane Mk.Ib (Z7015) arrives at the 2016 RIAT

The Sea Hurricane Mk IA was a Hurricane Mk I modified by Hawker or General Aircraft Limited to be carried by CAM ships (catapult-armed merchantman). These were cargo ships equipped with a catapult for launching an aircraft but without facilities to recover them. If the aircraft was not in range of a land base, the pilots would bail out and be picked up by the ship. They were informally known as "Hurricats". The majority of the aircraft modified had been worn out in front-line squadrons, so much so that at least one example used during trials broke up under the stress of a catapult launching. At least 60 aircraft were converted from Hurricane Mk Is. CAM launched Hurricanes were used on eight operational sorties and the Hurricanes shot down six aircraft, for the loss of one Hurricane pilot killed. The first Sea Hurricane IA kill was a German Focke-Wulf Fw 200 Condor long range patrol aircraft, shot down on 2 August 1941.

=== Sea Hurricane Mk IB ===
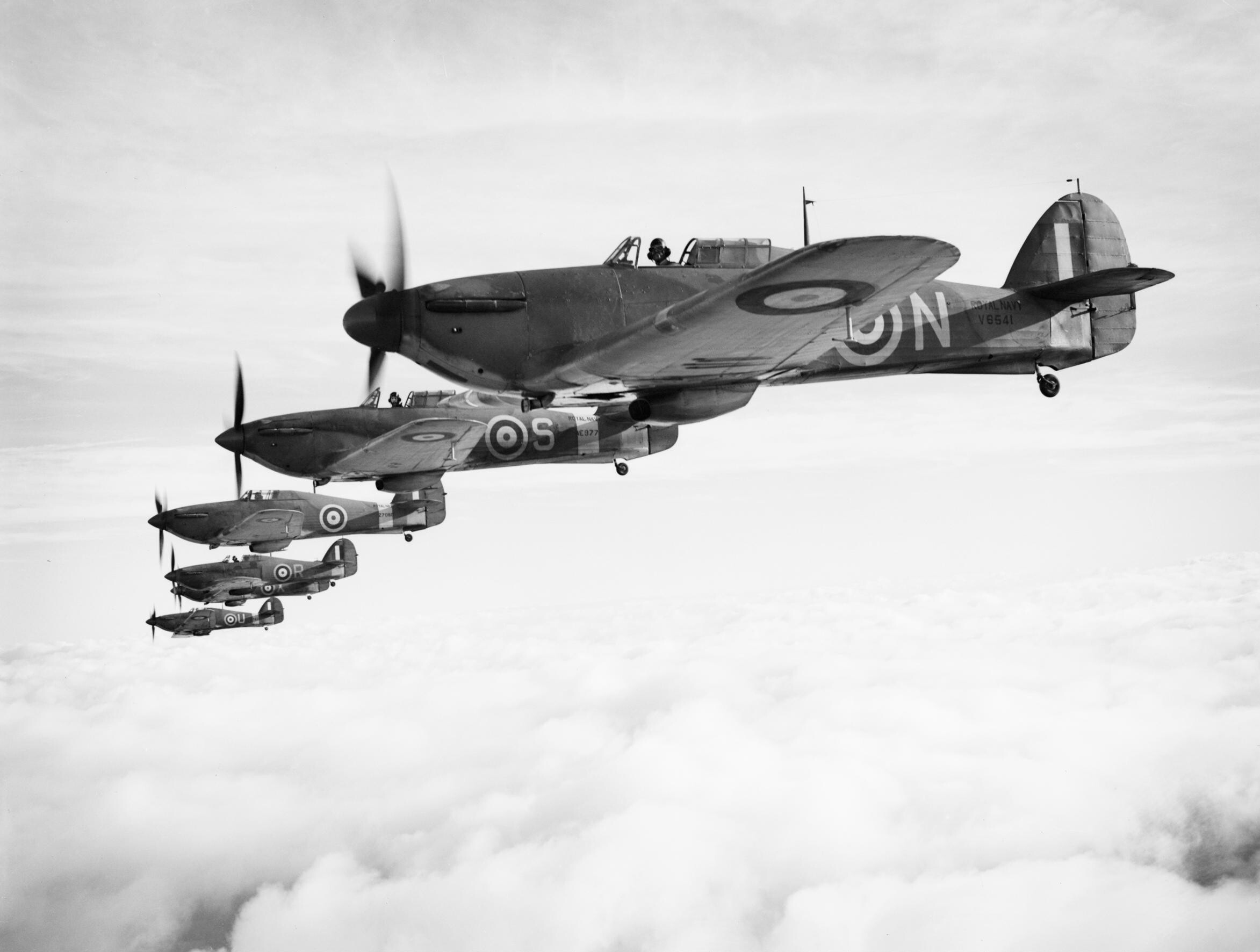
Sea Hurricanes Mk IB in formation, December 1941

This was a Hurricane Mk I version equipped with catapult spools and an arrestor hook. From July 1941 they operated from HMS Furious and from October 1941, they were used on Merchant aircraft carrier (MAC ships), which were large cargo vessels with a flight deck enabling aircraft to be launched and recovered; around 300 aircraft were converted. The first Sea Hurricane IB kill occurred on 31 July 1941, when Sea Hurricanes of 880 Squadron, operating from Furious, shot down a Dornier Do 18 flying boat. The Fleet Air Arm preferred the lighter de Havilland propellers over the Rotol types; it was found during tests that the Rotol unit could lead to the nose dipping during arrested landings, causing the propeller blades to "peck" the carrier deck. The lighter de Havilland units avoided this problem.

=== Sea Hurricane Mk IC ===
The Hurricane Mk I version equipped with catapult spools, an arrestor hook and the four-cannon wing. There are eight known conversions from Sea IA or IB in 1943 for the Merchant Ship Fighter Unit, with no operational use. Sea Hurricane IC may have been used during Operation Pedestal. Some Sea Hurricanes reportedly had their Merlin III engines adjusted to 16 lb maximum boost which would mean more than 1,400 hp at low altitude (5,000 ft). Lt. Richard Cork was credited with five kills while flying a Sea Hurricane IC during Pedestal.

=== Sea Hurricane Mk IIC ===
The Hurricane Mk IIC version equipped with catapult spools, an arrestor hook and full naval avionics. Around 60 were built by Hawker November 1942 to May 1943, around another 50 Mk IIB were converted, with most receiving C wings. The Merlin XX engine on the Sea Hurricane generated 1,460 hp at 6,250 ft (1,900 m) and 1,435 hp at 11,000 ft (3,400 m). Top speed was 322 mph (518 km/h) at 13,500 ft (4,100 m) and 342 mph (550 km/h) at 22,000 ft (6,700 m).

=== Sea Hurricane Mk XIIA ===
Canadian-built Sea Hurricane Mark I were converted to use the Merlin 29.

== See also ==
- Hawker Hurricane
- List of Hawker Hurricane operators
