= Yugoslavia and the Allies =

Events in World War II

In 1941 when the Axis invaded Yugoslavia, King Peter II formed a Government in exile in London, and in January 1942 the royalist Draža Mihailović became the Minister of War with British backing. But by June or July 1943, British Prime Minister Winston Churchill had decided to withdraw support from Mihailović and the Chetniks he led, and support the Partisans headed by Josip Broz Tito, even though this would result in "complete communist control of Serbia". The main reason for the change was not the reports by Fitzroy Maclean or William Deakin, or as later alleged the influence of James Klugmann in Special Operations Executive (SOE) headquarters in Cairo or even Randolph Churchill, but the evidence of Ultra decrypts from the Government Code and Cipher School in Bletchley Park that Tito's Partisans were a "much more effective and reliable ally in the war against Germany". Nor was it due to claims that the Chetniks were collaborating with the enemy, though there was some evidence from decrypts of collaboration with Italian and sometimes German forces.

== Contact with Yugoslavia ==
Given the intensity of 'Operation Punishment' and quick collapse of Yugoslav defence, some SOE agents made their own way to Istanbul or the Middle East, while others followed the fleeing Yugoslav government all the way to Montenegrin coast. Their plans to block the Danube and disrupt German oil and grain supplies from Romania by blowing up a large quantity of rock into the Kazan gorge, or sinking cement-laden barges at Greben narrows or the Sip canal mostly failed. In the end, the river was impassable for between three and five weeks without major impact on the enemy.

At the same time, SOE and the British government lost contact with the agents on the ground and it was August 1941, when Mihailović's radio signals were picked up by the British naval monitoring station in Malta. In the confusion of the initial reports, received via agents arriving overland to Istanbul, refugees, and Yugoslav Government-in-Exile (YGE) sources about the situation in the country, alleged persecutions and massacres, as well as pockets of resistance, British government had arranged for direct missions to the region. They mostly consisted of British SOE agents, W/T operators and Yugoslav army officers and had a similar brief: "to discover what was happening in Yugoslavia and co-ordinate all forces of resistance there".

Some of the most prominent missions are listed in table below.

Date	Code Name	Method	Departure	Landing	Members	Remarks
20/09/1941	Operation Bullseye	Submarine (HMS Triumph)	Malta	Petrovac (Montenegro)	Col D.T. Bill Hudson Maj Mirko Lalatović Maj Zaharije Ostojić Sgt Veljko Dragičević (W/T)	The very first SOE mission sent with the objective to discover what was happening in Yugoslavia and co-ordinate all forces of resistance there "regardless of national, religious or political belief". Due to issues with his radio, Hudson's broadcasts stopped on 19th Oct 1941. but resumed in May 1942.
26/01/1942	Operation Henna	Submarine (HMS Thorn)	Alexandria	Island of Mljet (Croatia)	Lt(R) Stanislav Rapotec Sgt Stevan Sinko (W/T)	Aimed to report on "Slovene patriotic organizations". Sinko was sick and left on Mljet, while Rapotec travelled widely meeting various resistance groups and leaders before surfacing in Turkey on 2 July 1942.
04/02/1942	Operation Hydra	Submarine (HMS Thorn)	Alexandria	Petrovac (Montenegro)	Maj Terence Atherton Lt R Nedeljković Sgt Patrick O'Donovan (W/T)	Aimed to report on situation in Montenegro. Met with Tito and the partisan HQ in Foča on 19th Mar 1942. but left on 16 April 1942 to find Mihailović and Bill Hudson. Atherton sent a letter to Mihailovic on 22nd Apr 1942. confirming that he was alive, but both he and O'Donovan were killed shortly afterwards by Spasoje Dakic.
04/02/1942	Operation Disclaim	Airborne		Sokolac (Bosnia)	Maj Cavan Elliot 2Lt Pavle Crnjanski Sgt Petar Miljković Sgt William Chapman (W/T)	Almost immediately picked up by Domobrans and handed over to the Germans in Sarajevo
28-29/04/1942		Airborne		Between Berane and Novi Pazar (Montenegro)	Sgt Milisav Bakić Sgt Milisav Semiz	Sent without the knowledge or agreement of the YGE. Arrested by the local quisling militia and given to the Germans.
Aug 1942	Operation Bullseye (ext.)	Airborne		Sinjajevina (Montenegro)	Lieut Lofts Two W/T operators	Signals party, arrived at Mihailović's HQ in order to establish a war station, enabling Bill Bailey to co-ordinate all SOE activities in the region (including Albania, Hungary, Romania and Bulgaria) and help Hudson and Mihailović have more secure and regular links with Cairo.
Sep 1942		Airborne			Capt (RYAF) Nedeljko Plećaš	Parachuted with radio sets for Mihailović and Trifunović-Birčanin, initially to link them to Cairo but later to Istanbul and finally to Algiers (in May 1944) to evade the British SOE.
25/12/1942	Operation Bullseye (ext.)	Airborne		Gornje Lipovo (Montenegro)	Col S.W. (Bill) Bailey W/T operator	Head of SOE Balkan section. Joined D.T. Bill Hudson at Mihailović's HQ. To report on the military value of the chetnik movement as a whole and to persuade Mihailović to undertake active sabotage. Study its political intentions and propose how British policy of creating a united resistance front could be implemented.
mid-Feb 1943		Airborne		Gornje Lipovo (Montenegro)	Maj Kenneth Greenlees	Joined Bailey and maintained routine contact with Mihailović when his relationship with Bailey deteriorated.
mid-Apr 1943 and 21/05/1943	Mission Greenwood-Rootham	Airborne		Homolje (Eastern Serbia)	Maj Erik Greenwood Maj Jasper Rootham Sgt W Anderson (W/T) Sgt C E Hall (RAF) (W/T) Lieut E (Micky) Hargreaves Royal Yugoslav Army (RYA) officer code-named "Arlo".	Sub-mission to Mihailović's regional headquarters, strategically important location, able to monitor and disrupt shipping on Danube (transporting Romanian oil crucial for the war effort), Belgrade-Salonika railway (used for supply of German troops in North Africa) and Bor copper mines (the largest in Europe).
20-21/04/1943	Operation Hoathley 1	Airborne	Derna (Libya)	Near Šekovići (Eastern Bosnia)	Stevan Serdar George Diklić Milan Družić	All three were miners from Quebec, whose experience with explosives was considered useful.
20-21/04/1943 and 18-19/05/1943	Operation Fungus	Airborne	Derna (Libya)	Near Brinje (Croatia)	Alexander Simić-Stevens Petar Erdeljac Paul Pavlić	Picked up by local peasants and passed onto partisan HQ for Croatia. Erdeljac was recognised by his old comrade from Spain, Ivan Rukavina, while Simić-Stevens had to be vetted by Vladimir Bakarić.
18-19/05/1943	Operation Fungus (ext.)	Airborne	Derna (Libya)	Near Brinje (Croatia)	Maj William Jones Capt Anthony Hunter Sgt Ronald Jephson	The first 'uniformed' mission to partisans - sabotage team to disrupt railway lines used to transport Axis war material and petrol.
27/05/1943	Operation Typical	Airborne	Derna (Libya)	Crno Jezero (Montenegro)	Col William Deakin Capt William F Stuart Sgt Walter Wroughton (W/T) Sgt Peretz 'Rose' Rosenberg (W/T) Canadian-Yugoslav Ivan ('John') Starčević (Translator) Sgt John Campbell (RM – bodyguard)	The first British mission fully assigned to Yugoslav partisans HQ and Marshall Tito.
03/07/1943		Airborne			Nikola Kombol (aka Nicola King)	Welcomed as an interpreter for several British liaison missions in Bosnia and Serbia. Parachuted for the second time in Sep 1944 to Macedonia, and crossed the Adriatic by RN motor gunboat for the third entry into Yugoslavia, in early 1945.
15/08/1943	Operation Typical (ext.)	Airborne		Petrovo Polje (Bosnia)	Flight-Lieut Kenneth Syers Maj Ian Mackenzie (RAMC)	Fl-Lieut Syers (RAF) was a SIS officer, replacement for Capt W F Stuart who was killed on 09/06/1943 at Sutjeska. He had worked for the British Council in pre-war Yugoslavia. Maj Mackenzie was an experienced surgeon at the Royal Army Medical Corps. His operations on the wounded while under constant enemy activity earned him and the British mission high moral credit.
16/08/1943	Mission Davidson	Airborne		Petrovo Polje (Bosnia)	Major Basil Davidson Sergeant William Ennis Sergeant Stanley Brandreth (wireless)	Davidson was the Acting Head of SOE Yugoslav Desk in Cairo and was sent to Bosnia in order to continue the journey and reach Hungary, where he had been posted just before the war.
21/08/1943	Operation Typical (ext.)	Airborne		Petrovo Polje (Bosnia)	Capt Melvin O Benson (OSS)	Melvin (Benny) Benson was the first American representative assigned to Yugoslav partisans HQ and Marshall Tito. He was under Deakin's command and shared British radio communications infrastructure. He stayed in the region for four months.
Aug 1943	Neronian Mission				Liet-Col Cope	Cope became a British Liaison Officer (BLO) to the local chetnik leader Maj Radoslav Đurić.
Aug 1943	Ballinclay			Drvar		The mission reported on battles between the Partisans and chetniks in Drvar area, and the death of Jovo Plećaš, local chetnik commander and collaborator.
Sep 1943	Maclean Mission (Macmis)	Airborne	Bizerta (Tunisia)	Mrkonjić-Grad (Bosnia)	BGen Fitzroy Maclean Maj Vivian Street Maj Linn "Slim" Farish John Henniker-Major Peter Moore Donald Knight Mike Parker Gordon Alston Robin Whetherly Sgt Duncan	The first British mission to Yugoslav partisans with full authorisation and personal message from Winston Churchill
Nov 1943	Mulligatawny Mission	Airborne		East of Lake Ohrid (Macedonia)	Maj Mostyn Davies Maj Frank Thompson (later)	SOE mission attempting to get in touch with the Bulgarian partisans. Both Davies and Thompson were to perish in the attempt to organise Bulgarian resistance.
Nov 1943	Mission Rogers	Sea	Southern Italy	Island of Vis	Maj Lindsay Rogers Sgt William (Bill) Gillanders RAF Sgt Ian McGregor.	Mission Rogers was a World War II Special Operations Executive (SOE) medical and military expedition to Yugoslav Partisans in Dalmatia, western Bosnia and Slovenia.
28/11/1943	Monkeywrench Mission	Airborne		Eastern Serbia	Maj Dugmore	SOE mission to Yugoslav partisans, sent to prepare the area for the British break with Mihailović.
Dec 1943	Clowder Mission	Air		Glamoč	Peter Wilkinson Maj Alfgar Hesketh-Pritchard Maj Charles Villiers	Focused on escalating the fighting in Slovenia in order to cut off the German connections and resupply links to Northern Italy as well as incursion into Austria.
Feb 1944	Operation Bunghole	Three Waco-CG4 gliders	Bari	Medeno Polje (Bosnia)	Lieut-Gen Nikolai Korneev Capt Cornelius Turner	The first official Soviet mission to Yugoslav partisans and the first RAF daytime glider landings inside the occupied Europe.
12/05/1944	Mission Dafoe	Airborne	Bari	Čanići (Eastern Bosnia)	Maj Colin Scott Dafoe Sgt Frank Sgt Chris	Mission Dafoe was a World War II Special Operations Executive (SOE) medical and military expedition to Yugoslav Partisans in Eastern Bosnia.
14/05/1944	Mission Lindsay	Airborne	Brindisi	Semič, Slovenia	Major Franklin Lindsay Lieutenant Gordon Bush, Lieutenant Schraeder - the weather officer Corporal James Fisher - the radio operator Corporal Edward Welles	Mission Lindsay was a World War II Office of Strategic Services (OSS) military expedition to Yugoslav Partisans in Slovenia, sent in May 1944.
01/09/1944	Operation Ratweek	Air / Sea / Land	Bari / Vis	Throughout Yugoslavia	BAF, USAAF 15th AF, LRDG	Series of coordinated attacks on the Axis lines of communication, principally the railways, in order to frustrate German withdrawal from the southern Balkans and consequent reinforcement of their troops in the north.
Sep 1944		Airborne		Macedonia	Nikola Kombol (aka Nicola King)	The second mission by Kombol/King, after the previous one in Bosnia and Serbia on 3 July 1943.
27/10/1944	Operation Floxo	Sea	Bari	Dubrovnik	Brigadier J P O'Brien-Twohig No. 43 Commando Unit 111 Field Regiment Field Unit of Royal Engineers	Operation Floxo / Floydforce was the name given to the British Army intervention unit sent to Yugoslavia in October 1944. Its main objective was to aid Yugoslav Partisans in preventing German withdrawal from Greece and Albania via Montenegro, and "to give the greatest possible artillery support to the Yugoslav National Army of Liberation".

Limited resources meant that in 1942 support for the Chetniks was limited to "words rather than deeds". The SOE, charged with fostering resistance movements, initially sent Captain D. T. Hudson as part of Operation Bullseye, to contact all resistance groups in September 1941. Hudson's reports on the meetings between Mihailović and Tito (and their staffs) were not encouraging, and he sent warnings that the communist Partisans suspected that Mihailović was collaborating with the government of Milan Nedić in Serbia. Contacts with both groups were severed by the first Axis winter offensive, but decrypts of German signals showed that the Chetniks were collaborating with the Italians. This collaboration was based on an old friendship of Serbs and Italians in Dalmatia going back to the times of the Austrian rule.

In June 1942 a report by Major General Francis Davidson, Director of Military Intelligence to Churchill, described the Partisans as "extreme elements and brigands". British Military Intelligence wanted to maintain support for Mihailović at the time that they were watching the progress of the German Operation Weiss against the Partisans, though they started having doubts by March 1943. Colonel Bateman in the Directorate of Military Operations also recommended supporting the "active and vigorous Partisans" rather than the "dormant and sluggish Chetniks."

An assessment by Major David Talbot Rice of MI3b in September 1943 confirmed that there had only been isolated anti-German activity by Mihailović and "the heroes of the hour are undoubtedly the Partisans". He recommended that Mihailović should be told to destroy German lines of communication in Serbia, otherwise Tito would be the sole recipient of British aid which they were at long last in a position to deliver. The Signals intelligence had completely changed the view of Talbot Rice and MI3b in six months.

When Mihailović was perceived as less effective than the communist Partisans, missions were sent to the Partisans. One of the first of these missions, codenamed "Fungus", was dropped "blind" in the area of Dreznica and Brinje, north west of Senj on the Croatian Adriatic coast, on the night of April 20/21 1943 by a Liberator of No. 148 Squadron RAF, operating from Derna The mission consisted of two Canadian emigrees (Petar Erdeljac and Pavle Pavlic), and Corporal Alexander Simic (Simitch Stevens) of the Royal Pioneer Corps. They were found by the partizans and taken to the Croatian Partizan HQ at Sisane Polje, where Erdeljac and Pavlic were recognized by Ivan Rukovina, the Commander of the Croatian HQ, who had fought with them in the International Brigades in Spain. Alexander Simic was interrogated at length by Dr Vladimir Bakaric, the Political Commissaar (who subsequently became President of Croatia) before being allowed to establish radio contact with SOE headquarters in Cairo and arrange the subsequent missions of Major William Jones to join Simic at the Croatian HQ and that of Captain Bill Deakin to Tito's Headquarters in May 1943.

He was joined the following September by Brigadier Fitzroy Maclean, an SAS officer and also a Conservative Member of Parliament and former diplomat, with good language skills. Maclean subsequently sent a "blockbuster report" to Foreign Secretary Anthony Eden, recommending that Britain should transfer support to Tito and sever links with Mihailović. In 1943 the SOE in England and the Foreign Office wanted to continue support for Mihailović, although as these organisations had only limited access to decrypts they were not so well-informed on the situation there. The SOE headquarters in Cairo (which was frequently at odds with the London headquarters), MI6, the Directorates of Military Intelligence and Operations, the Chiefs of Staff and ultimately Churchill himself, wanted to switch support to Tito.

== Churchill's sources ==
Churchill's main source was the intelligence decrypts from Bletchley Park which he saw "raw", as well as intelligence reports and digests. After receiving a signals intelligence digest in July 1943 he wrote that "it gave a full account of the marvellous resistance by the followers of Tito and the powerful cold-blooded manoeuvres of Mihailović in Serbia". Churchill announced his decision to support Tito to Soviet leader Joseph Stalin, much to his surprise, at the Tehran Conference in November 1943 and publicly in an address to Parliament on 22 February 1944. The address referred to reports from Deakin and Maclean for justification, as the Ultra decryptions from Bletchley Park were secret even after the war.

Maclean discussed Yugoslavia with Churchill in Cairo after the Tehran Conference. Maclean reported that "the Partisans, whether we helped them or not, would be the decisive political factor in Jugoslavia after the war and, secondly that Tito and the other leaders of the movement were openly and avowedly Communist and that the system which they would establish would inevitably be on Soviet lines and, in all probability, strongly oriented towards the Soviet Union". Churchill said that as neither of them intended to live there after the war, "the less you and I worry about the form of Government they set up, the better. That is for them to decide. What interests us is, which of them is doing most harm to the Germans". However, Maclean had also noticed Tito's "independence of mind" and wondered whether Tito might evolve into something more than a Soviet puppet.

While in England in the spring of 1944, Maclean discussed Yugoslavia with some of the British officers who had been attached to General Mihailović's Headquarters. One of the meetings was at Chequers and was presided over by Churchill himself. "It was common ground that the Cetniks, though in the main well disposed towards Great Britain, were militarily less effective with the communist Partisans and that some of Mihailović’s subordinates had undoubtedly reached accommodation with the enemy." Some who knew him best, "while liking and respecting him as a man, had little opinion of Mihailović as a leader", but the Chetnik detachments in Serbia at least could be a significant force with "new and more determined leadership and with better discipline." Maclean was also asked to Buckingham Palace to brief King George VI on the Yugoslav situation. He found him as well-informed on the situation as anyone else he had met back in England, and said he "took an entirely realistic view of it".

== British Intelligence sources ==
Most of the Signals intelligence obtained by Bletchley Park on the Balkans was initially from Luftwaffe morse code traffic encoded by Enigma; initially the general Luftwaffe Red key, then various German Army keys. They also decrypted various teleprinter links for high-level traffic: Fish (Vienna-Athens) then Codfish (Straussberg-Salonika), plus medium and low grade hand cyphers. Abwehr, Sicherheitsdienst and railway communications were intercepted and decrypted, providing evidence of resistance activities. For the German policy on Yugoslavia, communications to Tokyo from the Japanese ambassador, General Oshima Hiroshi, were also useful. With the primitive communications infrastructure and the disruption of land communications, the German forces in Yugoslavia relied heavily on radio communications, which, unknown to themselves, were insecure. A 1945 comment was that "never in the field of Signals intelligence has so much been decrypted about so little".

While the volume of messages was not great, Bletchley Park also intercepted messages from Tito and from the separate Slovene Communist Party to Georgi Dimitrov, the Secretary-General of the Comintern in Moscow. The messages to Dimitrov continued even after the Comintern was officially dissolved in June 1943.

The volume of Enigma decrypts from the Soviet Fronts and the Balkans declined substantially from the summer of 1944, but it was more than offset for the Soviet Fronts by success with Fish links.

== Discovery of collaboration ==
During Operation Weiss against the Partisans in 1943, the Italian forces used Italian-officered Chetnik units against the communist Partisans despite German objections. Consequently, the German Operation Schwarz against the Chetniks and Partisans was kept secret from the Italians. Pavle Đurišić, one of Mihailović’s principal commanders, fell out with Mihailović as he wished to join the Germans against the Partisans, which Mihailović refused to contemplate. Both Axis operations were followed by Bletchley Park in decrypts from the Abwehr (German military intelligence). A decrypted report from General Alexander Löhr, the commander in chief of the German Army Group E in the Balkans, reported on 22 June that 583 German soldiers and 7,489 Partisans had been killed, with the probability that the Partisans had lost another 4,000 men. Chetnik losses were put at 17, with nearly 4,000 taken prisoner. The contrast between the two resistance movements was stark. However, the decrypts, "far from providing evidence of Cetnik-German collaboration, continued to leave no doubt that at least at the highest level the Germans remained set on Mihailović's destruction. In July Hitler had suggested that the C-in-C South East [Löhr] should put a higher price on the heads of Mihailović and Tito."

The most significant report of Chetnik collaboration was the text of a treaty between Vojislav Lukačević, one of Mihailović’s principal commanders, and the German Military Commander in southeast Europe, Hans Felber in September and October 1943, In the treaty, which was copied to Churchill, Lukačević agreed to a cessation of hostilities in his area of southern Serbia and joint action against the communist Partisans.

== British missions ==
It was indeed all too clear to everyone of us who served with the partisans that they had existed in very concrete and combatant form before we had ever appeared upon the scene—and even, in the days when we were supplying the chetniks, in spite of our mistaken efforts—and that they would have existed, and probably have triumphed, whatever course we had chosen to take.

— Basil Davidson

Deakin's mission to the Partisans was called Operation Typical, and it represented the British General Headquarters in the Middle East. The first parachuted supplies dropped to the Partisans had a very marked propaganda effect despite some bizarre episodes, e.g. a planeload of Atrobin for treating malaria, and a supply of badly needed boots, but all for the left foot. In May 1943, a signal from Cairo ordered that medical supplies, which had been loaded onto a Handley Page Halifax at Derna were to be left behind, as their despatch would infringe British obligations to the Royal Yugoslav government. The plane's crew complied, but loaded all the military items, e.g., boots, clothing, guns and ammunition, that they could loot at the airfield onto the aircraft.

Deakin welcomed Mission Davidson on 16 August 1943, and an American representation on 21 August 1943 when Captain Melvin O. (Benny) Benson of the Office of Strategic Services (OSS) arrived, remaining in Yugoslavia for four months. Benson noted in his report "the giving of credit to the Cetniks for Partisan victories and otherwise referring to them as Patriots, in an attempt to include the Cetniks with the Partisans." The crediting of Partisan attacks to Chetniks was also being reported on the BBC. Captain Benson was later replaced by Major Linn (Slim) Farish.

The sending of the Maclean mission on 17 September 1943 placed the relations between Tito and the British on a more formal and senior level. Fitzroy Maclean was the personal representative of the Prime Minister, and his arrival marked implicitly the de facto recognition of the Yugoslav National Liberation Army, as the Partisans were formally known.

Maclean wondered whether officials in Cairo "quite realised the difficulties of travel in German-occupied Europe", when he was told in an official signal that he was to go to Cairo immediately but that the Partisan delegation could follow later if required... (it turned out that the British delegation was returning from the conference at Teheran via Cairo). While away down the coast Maclean was amazed to receive a garbled message from Cairo, with a clear sentence "King now in Cairo, Will be dropped to you at first opportunity." He thought that as part of London's gradual rapprochement policy between King Peter of Yugoslavia and the Partisans, the King was to be "dropped headlong into the seething centre of the Jugoslav cauldron." Later he was told that the message referred to their new signals officer, whose surname was King.

When the Italians surrendered the mission received a signal from the British General Headquarters in the Mediterranean regarding the Italian forces, which assumed that "the British mission attached to Tito's headquarters was in some queer fashion in operational command of operational ‘guerrilla’ units." Similar orders were sent to Colonel Bailey at Mihailović’s headquarters and to the commanders of British missions in Greece and Albania, and the episode revealed "the extent to which our mission had not succeeded in conveying to our superiors the reality of the situation in Partisan-held territory."

== Switching support to the Partisans ==
The fact remains that the decision to send liaison officers and military stores to the partisans was one which the Foreign Office manifestly disliked; and it is common knowledge that this decision was obtained only after the military authorities (then in Cairo) had demonstrated, from information which could not be denied or ignored, that the partisan war effort was overwhelmingly greater than that of the chetniks.

— Basil Davidson

The change in Allied support in Yugoslavia from the Chetniks to the Partisans in 1943 was because they were a more effective ally. The public justification at the time was the reports from Maclean and Deakin; the real source was the signals intelligence decrypts, but they were secret at the time and remained so until the 1970s when the work of Bletchley Park was made public. The change was driven by Churchill and (British) Army Intelligence, but was not due to any supposed influence from Randolph Churchill or James Klugmann.

From the beginning of the war in south-eastern Europe, there were clear ideological differences between largely conservative British establishment (government, senior military officers and civil servants, and the leadership of SOE) and mainly left-wing resistance movements on the ground. The establishment had obligations towards kings and governments in exile whom it was committed to restoring to throne and power. The resistance fighters while happy to take up arms against the foreign invaders, often suffered from crudely militaristic tyrannies imposed by those same reactionary kings and governments throughout 1920s and 1930s, and were unwilling to fight for their restoration to power.

Churchill's son Randolph was on one of the missions to Yugoslavia. Evelyn Waugh accompanied Randolph Churchill, and Waugh put in a report about Tito's persecution of the clergy, which was "buried" by Foreign Secretary Anthony Eden. No evidence is given for the suggestion made in the article on Draža Mihailović that Randolph Churchill privately influenced his father to support Tito, and in any case he was recruited by Maclean for his mission after the Teheran Conference, when the decision to support Tito had already been made.

James Klugmann was a Communist and was undoubtedly a Soviet intelligence agent and linked to the Cambridge Five. He joined the Yugoslav section of SOE Cairo in 1942, where he advocated and lobbied for Tito. But it was stated that "Whatever lobbying may have been taking place in Cairo, it would have been the overwhelming evidence of the Bletchley Park decrypts, Churchill's favoured source of intelligence, which persuaded Britain's wartime leader that Tito and his Partisans were a much more effective, and reliable, ally in the war against Germany."

Captain Bill Deakin, who led the first military mission in 1943 and was caught up in the Battle of the Sutjeska (hence the title of his book) had been Churchill’s researcher and librarian in the thirties.

== American missions ==
The relationship between the British and American intelligence and special operations services was complex. Under the terms of 'London Agreement' signed in June 1942 all Office of Strategic Services (OSS) missions in Europe were under the SOE command. Similarly, the US authorities regarded Yugoslavia as a British responsibility. However, SOE still had concerns with the American post-war hegemony of big business in the Balkans. Consequently, direct contacts between the YGE and the US representatives was monitored and discouraged. This included King Peter's request in 1942, for the Americans to supply long range aircraft by which the Yugoslavs themselves could deliver arms to their resistance movement.

== Soviet missions ==
Until mid-1942, Soviet official position and propaganda followed the British model of supporting the YGE, with whom it had re-established the diplomatic relations, and Mihailović as its legitimate representative. Although in direct contact with Tito's partisans via the Comintern, they were reluctant to encourage the revolutionary drive for fear of antagonizing the Western Allies on whose aid Soviet Union depended for survival. The first official Soviet mission led by General Korneyev (Korneev) arrived on 23rd Feb 1944.

== Allied bombings ==
The United States Army Air Force (USAAF) and Royal Air Force (RAF) bombed many Yugoslav cities and towns during the Axis occupation. These attacks included intensive air support for Partisan operations in May–June 1944, and a bombing campaign against transport infrastructure in September 1944 as the Wehrmacht retreated from the Balkans. This latter operation was known as Operation Ratweek.

== Aftermath ==
When George Musulin organized the 1944 final rescue of 500 American airmen called Operation Halyard, Draža Mihailović sent a political mission to Bari, Italy, aboard an American plane. The arrival of Adam Pribićević (now former President of the Independent Democratic Party of the Kingdom of Yugoslavia), Dr. Vladimir Belajčić (former Justice of the Superior Court of the Kingdom of Yugoslavia), Ivan Kovač (a Chetnik representative), and Major Zvonko Vučković (one of the principal Chetnik commanders) caused the British concern since they had already chosen whom to back. At the Bari stopover, Ivan Šubašić, who signed the Treaty of Vis, also known as the Tito-Šubašić Agreement, earlier that year, met with the members of Mihailović's political mission but the Prime Minister-in-exile said nothing about the agreement he signed months earlier compromising the Kingdom of Yugoslavia. Pribićević and his team remained in the West after the war ended, like thousands of other soldiers who managed to escape.

== Sources ==
- Cripps, John (2001). "Mihailović or Tito? How the Codebreakers Helped Churchill Choose (Chapter 13 pp237-263)". In Smith, Michael; Erskine, Ralph (eds.). Action This Day. London: Bantam. ISBN 0-593-04910-1.
- Davidson, Basil (1980). Special Operations Europe. Victor Gollancz Ltd, London. ISBN 0-575-02820-3
- Deakin, F.W.D. (1971). The Embattled Mountain. Oxford University Press, London. ISBN 0-19-215175-4.
- Hinsley, F.H.; et al. (1984). British Intelligence in the Second World War: Its Influence on Strategy and Operations. Vol. 3 Part 1 (Chapter 33. HMSO. ISBN 0-11-630935-0.
- Hadži-Jovančić, Perica. "Losing the Periphery: The British Foreign Office and Policy Towards Yugoslavia, 1935-1938" Diplomacy & Statecraft (March 2020) 31#1 pp 65–90.
- Lindsay, Franklin (1993). Beacons in the night: with the OSS and Tito's partisans in wartime Yugoslavia. Stanford, California: Stanford University Press. ISBN 0-8047-2123-8.
- MacLaren, Roy (1982). Canadians Behind Enemy Lines, 1939-1945. Vancouver and London: University of British Columbia Press. ISBN 0-7748-0147-6.
- Maclean, Fitzroy (1949). Eastern Approaches. Jonathan Cape, London.
- McConville, Michael (2007). A Small War in the Balkans. Uckfield: The Naval & Military Press Ltd. ISBN 978-1-847347-13-8.
- Rootham, Jasper (1946). Miss Fire. London: Chatto & Windus.
- Street, Brian Jeffrey (2005). The Parchute Ward. Brian Jeffrey Street. ISBN 1-4116-5360-2.
- Williams, Heather (2003). Parachutes, Patriots, and Partisans. C. Hurst & Co. (Publishers) Ltd, London, ISBN 1-85065-592-8
