= Mission Davidson =

World War II Special Operations Executive

Mission Davidson was a World War II Special Operations Executive (SOE) military expedition to Yugoslav Partisans led by Basil Davidson, a peacetime journalist, Sergeant William Ennis and a wireless operator Sergeant Stanley Brandreth. Codenamed "Savannah", the mission landed by parachute at Petrovo Polje in central Bosnia on 16 August 1943. They were welcomed by the local British Liaison Officer, Major William Deakin, who took Davidson to meet Marshall Tito. Once he explained that his ambition was to get into Hungary, Tito suggested Davidson joins General Kosta Nađ and his troops on their way towards Belgrade.

== Background ==
Davidson was a journalist, and in the autumn of 1939 he worked as the Paris correspondent for The Economist. He returned to London and was shortly approached by the SOE for a post in the Balkans. He left for Hungary via Yugoslavia in January 1940. On the long train journey he was accompanied by a fellow SOE colleague and sacks of explosives for which they bribed the Hungarian customs not to inspect. They arrived safely to Budapest and delivered the sacks to the British legation building. Davidson soon set up an above-board news agency to deliver British news to the local press and radio, and a clandestine operation "to promote resistance" to the subsumption of Hungary into the German war machine. He organised the printing and distribution of leaflets written by George Paloczi-Horvath suggesting the existence of a large anti-Nazi organisation. By the autumn of 1940, the flow of news from London ceased, and Davidson started making-up his own, greatly exaggerating British military might and German and Italian frailties and losses. Although in the safety of Budapest, he found the news of London being ferociously bombed and Britain's survival at stake difficult to take.

Things went from bad to worse, and when the British ambassador (most likely Owen O'Malley) found the sacks of plastic explosives and magnetised metal casings in the embassy basement, he ordered it be thrown away. Davidson realised that they will no longer be able to disrupt German oil and raw material shipping on the Danube. By March 1941, through Antal Ullein-Reviczky, his contact at the Hungarian Foreign Office, he realised that the escalation of war was imminent and that he had to flee. On 3 April he boarded the train to Belgrade, Yugoslavia.

== The escape ==
On 6 April, Davidson was in Belgrade's Hotel Majestic when the German saturation bombing started. Operation Punishment was in full force and much of the city was left in ruins. The SOE members joined a convoy of over one hundred evacuees led by the British ambassador Sir Ronald Campbell heading slowly towards the Adriatic coast. They reached Herceg Novi and managed to evacuate the most exposed members, including George Paloczi-Horvath, using a Sunderland flying boat. Ambassador Campbell remained with the rest of the group and tried to label the remaining SOE members as Press Attaches hoping that they would be treated as diplomats, although they had no such passport or other evidence. A British submarine was able to reach Herceg Novi, but the Italian troops had already taken the town and the group was in their custody. They were loaded onto trucks and driven to Albania for internment. Finally, they were exchanged for Duke of Aosta, the Italian commander in Ethiopia who had been captured by the British Army in East Africa. Davidson eventually reached Gibraltar. Together with the locally posted officers, he was surprised at the news of German invasion of Russia on 22 June and the timing and reasoning behind it.

Davidson returned to London and spent the next twelve months at the SOE HQ in Baker Street before being posted to the Middle East.

== In Cairo ==
Davidson travelled between Cairo, Jerusalem and Istanbul as the fortunes of the war in Africa were changing. In July 1942, he de-briefed Stanislav Rapotec, who recently arrived to Istanbul from a covert mission to Yugoslavia. In October, he was promoted to Major and appointed the Acting Head of SOE Yugoslav Desk in Cairo assisted by Lieutenant James Klugmann and Major William Deakin. They ultimately reported to Brigadier C M Keble, who was in charge of all operational sections of SOE Cairo.

The remnants of the Royal Yugoslav Army (RYA) rebranded as the Yugoslav Army in the Fatherland (Chetniks) and led by Colonel Draža Mihailović, although frequently accused of complicity with the enemy and reluctance to fight, continued to receive British assistance and military missions.

Against all the evidence of chetnik complicity with the enemy, high policy insisted on sending more British missions to chetnik groups; and no fewer than nine such missions were despatched from April 1943 onward through the summer. All of these tried to make the chetniks fight; none of them succeeded. Each suffered sore frustration and was lucky to survive.

— Basil Davidson

At the same time, SOE officers travelled to Canada to recruit mission volunteers among Yugoslav emigrants. The rumours about an active Partisan resistance movement continued as well as an inexplicable presence of numerous German divisions, desperately needed on the Eastern Front, stuck in parts of the country not known for any recognised opposition. It became clear that there was much fighting on the ground. By January 1943, intercepted and decoded German Military Security Service (SD) radio signals detailed continuous fighting between the Partisans and the Germans.

One SD unit advised another that a strong partisan force was concentrated on the Foča-Kalinovik road and chetniks were being called to reinforce a German operation against them. Another unit appealed for help against partisans who were preparing an offensive from the direction of the Glamoč mountain. A third SD unit at Banja Luka warned of new partisan brigades in action against German units between Jajce and Kotor Varoš. A fourth indicated the location, as the SD thought, of partisan headquarters in Croatia. And so on and on, detail piling upon detail.

— Basil Davidson

Keble asked Davidson to work closely with Deakin and plot all SD reported Partisan positions on a map. Using the German confidential sources it shortly became obvious that "The Partisans were active in most regions of Yugoslavia. They were strong, effective and aggressive. They were a formidable fighting force in constant use".

On 28 January Deakin and Keble met Winston Churchill in Cairo and showed him their map of Partisan activity. Churchill asked for a memo which Keble duly provided - named "Operations in Yugoslavia". The memo stated that aid to Mihailović should continue in areas where his troops are known to be active. It stated that 'Other resisting elements' in Slovenia and Croatia were holding down thirty divisions in areas which are vital to both Italian and German communications - without having received any external aid at all. Their leadership was politically 'extreme left' but the rank and file were 'not necessarily politically minded'. It claimed that it was inaccurate to adopt the German branding of the whole movement as 'communist'. Finally, it asked for a few long-range Liberator aircraft so that the aid could be delivered to both sides. They received four smaller Halifax bombers instead.

It was thanks to Davidson's map that the first two missions of Yugoslav Canadians were successfully parachuted blind into the occupied territory, hoping to stumble across local Partisans on 20 April. Both Operation Hoathley 1 and Operation Fungus reached the targeted groups and reported back to Cairo HQ. The team prepared the first British Liaison mission, and on 26 May six soldiers led by Deakin successfully dropped to the Partisan GHQ at Black Lake in Montenegro. Codenamed Operation Typical, they landed in the middle of a large German offensive - Operation Schwarz - which aimed to surround and destroy the Partisan forces. They followed the GHQ out of the encirclement and less than three months later Davidson joined them.

== Arrival ==
Shortly after the landing, Davidson met the battle-hardened partisan leadership around Tito's command table "an affair of rough-hewn planks" where "his counsellors sat on logs ranged on both sides". In addition to Vlatko Vladimir Velebit who was assigned to work with the British mission, there were Arso Jovanović, Marko Aleksandar Ranković, Veljko Pavle Ilić and Kosta Nađ. Most communications were done in a "hotch-potch of German and French"

None of them had had experience of Anglo-Saxon manners of indifference; small wonder they often found us incomprehensible, took our affectation for indecision, suspected funk in our reluctance, feared sarcasm in our understatement, saw weakness in our admiration, under-rated our intelligence. Only their own patent courage and disinterest won them our forgiveness... For us it was all too easy to forget that we had armed their enemies and fought a word-war against them; but it was not so easy for them to forget it... This question of sincerity was to remain a shadow over friendship: it was so easy for either of us to see a purely selfish motive in the other's conduct.

— Basil Davidson

Approximately ten days later, Davidson joined Nađ's HQ slow move towards Belgrade so that he could reach Hungarian border. His additional task was to welcome and assist other SOE agents get into Hungary via Yugoslavia. Steve Markos, a Canadian agent, infiltrated himself successfully via this route, and was able to send "valuable reports about German and Hungarian armies' movements and about factories making war materials" back to Davidson for onward transmission to Cairo.

== Journey ==
The Mission had a long way on foot and horseback over the mountainous terrain of central Bosnia, often intersected with river valleys with limited crossings, strongly guarded by enemy troops. They paused in the village of Maslovare, where they learnt about Italian capitulation, which enabled the partisan movement to expand their territory and strengthen their fighting capability. Their first major challenge was to cross the river Bosna and the key road and railway lines that run alongside it, whilst under aerial reconnaissance. After just missing an armoured train, the column reached the river at a spot where it was divided into branches by shingle spits. Mainly on foot and holding onto each other, the troops crossed the deep river in a single file and reached the eastern bank. From there, they continued onto Gradačac, and Srebrenik before reaching Tuzla. The long journey gave Davidson an opportunity to understand the origins and motivation of the Partisan movement, local attitudes and customs as well as the poverty, illiteracy and communal tensions. By now, he had met many senior Partisan commanders including Todor Vujasinović Toša, Vladimir Popović and Sulejman Filipović as well as Canadian miners George Diklić and Stevan Serdar who arrived in April 1943 as part of Operation Hoathley 1.

== In Srem ==
In October, the mission crossed the river Sava and arrived at Sremska Rača, an encircled enclave that a small group of Partisans managed to keep for the time being. It was an opportunity to see Partisan civic, military and Party administration at first hand.

In the village itself there was an Odbor, or committee, of elected villagers who were responsible for local government in all its aspects, from taking of decisions on what the village should grow, when and where the cattle should be put to pasture, and who should mend the fences (questions the village had always decided by show of hands), to the newer and infinitely more delicate problems of liaison with the people's army. In its most developed form the village Odbor as it worked in Srem was a remarkably efficient and all-inclusive organization; in Racha it was necessarily in a simple form, but the main elements were there.

— Basil Davidson

The days were spent in conversation with local fighters, including a senior officer Savo Orović, discussing news, half-truths and rumours which were plentiful. Their plan to move north across Danube into the Hungarian controlled territory of Bačka suffered a set-back as the enemy offensive, by "Vlasov troops", pushed them onto Jamena, and back across the Sava into northern Bosnia. There, they worked with the commander Danilo Lekić in order to communicate with the British HQ and arrange for further drops of military and medical materiel. By December, they were chased out again, crossed the Sava and finally arrived to Fruška Gora overlooking Danube.

Davidson worked closely with the local Partisan unit, observing the burnt out and heavily damaged villages of Prnjavor, Graboš, Rakovac, Ledinci, Sviloš, Neštin, Susek, Banoštor, as well as others. He joined them in action to blow up the railway link between Beočin cement works and the main railhead, while continuing onward to log the positions of the 24 barrage balloons that were flying above key railway bridge across Danube before returning to the base at Jazak.

In-between the operations, Davidson thought about the circumstances in which the Partisan movement had developed and the reasons he thought it had strong local support:

In the days before the movement grew strong enough to offer an alternative structure of social behaviour, it was therefore every man for himself... To be Serbian in Srem at that time was to qualify for a concentration camp or a grave. Unrecorded numbers of Serbian peasants were taken into Mitrovitsa and other centres and shot down in heaps; and neither age, infirmity nor innocence were spared. Terrible things were done. It was clear that the old society was gone, and could scarcely return; but it was not yet clear what would come next...the realization came at different times in different parts of the country - what moral force could claim their allegiance, could bind them together, in the establishment of a new society.

— Basil Davidson

In January 1944, the Mission was told that the situation in Bačka had worsened and that the infiltration would be impossible. They decided to return towards Bosut and Sremska Rača. There they learnt that the British party further south had been ambushed. Sergeants Enis and Pavichich were killed and Captain Jeffries, Sergeant-Major Evans and Sergeant Chudich were taken prisoner. The intelligence and enemy movements indicated an even bigger intervention, and by late February the Partisans had to withdraw farther back to North-eastern Bosnia.

We could not know, equally, what beastliness these troops would commit in Racha; but as a matter of principle it was arranged that all the young people, liable to be arrested or raped or shot or simply driven away into Germany for slave labour, should cross Sava in good time and shield behind Lekitch's formations. The enemy might burn a few houses, but the old people could not be dangerous or useful to him and he might be expected to let them be. In any case there were no two ways about this: the old people had to stay. The village was their whole life; and they could not leave it... They waved to us as we went out of the village, standing in silent groups around their cottage doors and murmuring only a little between themselves. Their young people were going with us, and they were pleased.

— Basil Davidson

On 11 March, Davidson heard German mortar attack facilitating their crossing of the river Sava from Bosnia into Srem. It was done by the 13th SS Division (Handschar). His mission marched further south and joined the 16th and 36th Partisan divisions at Koraj. There, they organised additional war aid drops as well as personnel reinforcements, Captains Ted Howe and Irwin and a wireless operator, Corporal Wardle. On 4 April the team started their return to Srem.

== Rača murders ==
Returning to Sremska Rača, Davidson encountered the war at its worst. The Serb civilians left behind, too old or sick to move had been slaughtered by the SS.

They found a scene of unrelieved frightfulness. The corpses of 220 human beings, of which 83 were women and fifty were old men and the remainder children too young to have crossed the Sava in our retreat, were lying about the village, in little heaps in backyards, in the shallowest of graves, hidden under sheaves of maize stalk, or simply abandoned in the road. In the village of Bosut, three miles away, they found the corpses of 75 women, 45 children and 38 old men; and the story was much the same in Morovitch and two other villages. A later calculation showed that a total of 460 old men, women and young children had been murdered in these villages, apart from several who could not be accounted for. In most cases we found that they had had their throats cut. Seventy or eighty houses had been burnt.

— Basil Davidson

Davidson went to his old house in the village and found it in ruin, with both his hosts killed and their bodies dumped in the back garden.

== Bačka and back ==
The mission found Fruška Gora in April looking very different to the dark, muddy and wet place they left in December. They quickly established the communications and were able to arrange for aid drops to Šuljam where they were staying. Soon they moved onto Neštin hoping to cross the Danube into the Hungarian-occupied Bačka. They did this in a leaky RAF rescue rubber boat, circular and designed for emergency landings in the sea and "hopelessly impractical when floating free". The group paddled and pumped the dinghy vigorously and were able to cross unnoticed by the enemy bunkers strewn across the bankside. They quickly established the contacts and were able to reach the local town of Bačka Palanka where they were welcomed by the local organiser Leposava Andrić "Baba".

Soon after, the news of the Normandy landings had spread throughout the movement, and the promises of the Second Front were finally realised. This was of "inestimable moral value to the movement" as the end of the war was finally in sight. Davidson returned to Fruška Gora and continued to work on organising the air-drops. Germans could not abandon Srem as it was the main transport route for the incoming goods and supplies to their troops in Greece. On June 8, the Partisans realised that the Germans are bringing reinforcements and that they had to leave the villages and hide deep into the forest. Those who could not leave had to hide in underground shelters waiting for the enemy offensive to end. Some felt that it was the "last one".

The mission moved further south and via Šašinci and Ašanja arrived to their new headquarters in the village of Popinci. They were chased by the Germans who torched the nearby village of Pećinci in reprisal. By mid-July, the Partisans were back in Fruška Gora, fighting to reclaim their lost ground. Davidson now arranged for the first airborne evacuation of the 56 wounded fighters and left with them to southern Italy.

== Epilogue ==
After a short treatment for dysentery, Davidson was back to the same airstrip on September 8. The sense of German loss of control was evident and he was able to station himself in the town of Novi Sad and wait for further instructions unmolested by either German or Hungarian authorities. From there, he moved back to Srem and met up with Kosta Nađ once again. On October 17, they flew together out of Srem and further east into Banat behind the Soviet troops and setup the new military and civilian authority led by Ivan Milutinović. It was his first opportunity to see the Soviet infantry, mostly made of Ukrainians, in action and the new civilian authorities and order the Partisans were trying to establish.

This included some locals who disagreed with the new order:

The rejoicing that went with liberation was not quite unanimous. We found that as soon as we got into the towns. The peasants were for us, wholeheartedly (after all, it was their movement) but this was not entirely true of the people who had stayed in the towns... The middle-class which had submitted to enemy occupation (even when, as rarely, it had not collaborated with the enemy) found that the new distribution of power would largely pass them over... They poked derision at the mistakes the new administration, unused to government, inevitably made. They were condescending when they had the courage for it; otherwise they were servile and false... The position in Novi Sad, in this respect at least, was not unlike the position in any other occupied and now liberated town of Europe.

— Basil Davidson

Shortly afterwards, Basil Davidson returned to London and continued his career in journalism.

== Sources ==
- Churchill, Winston S. (1952). The Second World War, Volume V - Closing the ring. London: Cassell & Co. Ltd.
- Davidson, Basil (1946). Partisan Picture. Bedford: Bedford Books Ltd.
- Davidson, Basil (1980). Special Operations Europe Scenes from the Anti-Nazi War. London: Victor Gollancz Ltd. ISBN 0-575-02820-3.
- Deakin, F. W. D. (2011). The Embattled Mountain. London: Faber and Faber Ltd. ISBN 978-0-571-27644-8.
- MacLaren, Roy (1982). Canadians Behind Enemy Lines, 1939-1945. Vancouver and London: University of British Columbia Press. ISBN 0-7748-0147-6.
- Williams, Heather (2003). Parachutes, Patriots, and Partisans. London: C. Hurst & Co. (Publishers) Ltd. ISBN 1-85065-592-8.
