= Mission Rogers =

World War II Special Operations Executive

Mission Rogers was a World War II Special Operations Executive (SOE) medical and military expedition to Yugoslav Partisans in Dalmatia, western Bosnia and Slovenia. The group was led by Major Lindsay Rogers and included Sergeant William (Bill) Gillanders RAMC and an RAF Sergeant Ian McGregor. Codenamed "Vaseline" the mission left southern Italy in a Royal Navy submarine and reached the island of Vis in late November 1943.

== Background ==
After the Allied victory in North Africa, and their advancement in southern Italy, it became logistically easier to assist anti-Axis fighters throughout the Balkans. By this time, Yugoslav Partisans led by Marshall Tito made significant wins and territory gains against both Italian and German war machine. British Government, although initially hesitant, decided to send their first expedition led by William Deakin in May 1943, and the second one four months later, led by Brigadier Fitzroy Maclean.

The partisan warfare demanded agility and near-constant movement of troops which made medical provisioning very difficult. At the same time - frostbite, typhoid, scurvy, serious shrapnel and gunshot wounds required surgery, patient isolation and periods of hospitalisation, almost impossible to provide in such a volatile situation.

"Casualties from wounds, disease and frostbite were heavy. For the Partisans, to whom mobility was a prime consideration, the question of what to do with their wounded was a major problem. If they carried them with them, they hampered their movements. If they abandoned them, they met a terrible death at the hands of the Germans. Apart from this, they were short of doctors and lacked medical supplies almost completely. As a result, men were dying like flies."

— Maclean, p. 430

The Partisans desperately needed medical materiel, medicament and equipment, as well as experienced medical professionals to triage, operate and monitor recovering fighters and civilians. As General Kosta Nađ, one of their most senior officers confirmed:

"A surgeon was more valuable to us than a division!"

— Street, p. X

Major Ian Mackenzie (RAMC), an experienced surgeon, joined Deakin's mission after parachuting to Petrovo Polje on 15 August 1943. Working with Olga Humo as his interpreter, he was able to operate on the wounded fighters under continuous enemy action. He met and developed a "warm and close understanding" with the Partisan Chief of Medical Staff General Gojko Nikoliš. Deakin realised the significant "moral credit" that the British mission received for Mackenzie's presence, and the importance of the care for the wounded:

"The morale of the army was shown to be dependent, in an intimate and mutual bond between the fighting Partisan and his wounded or sick comrade, on its ability to protect the defenceless and to preserve the unity and order of the whole main body under operational conditions."

— Deakin, p. 43

== Mission Rogers ==
=== On Vis ===
Upon arrival on the island, the three medics engaged with local doctors and converted an empty villa into a hospital settling for the winter, although under daily Stuka bombardments. The wounded kept coming, now with frostbites and gangrenous injuries. At the same time, stories of even greater medical needs of Partisans in Lika started circulating. The trio asked to be relieved, so they could move inland towards them. They carried their stores and left Vis in the dead of night on a small fishing boat, heading north while trying to avoid German E-boats. They passed the Kornati and Dugi Otok until they finally reached Dalmatian mainland.

=== Mainland ===
After some time wandering in the frozen landscapes of Lika, the group reached Plitvice, and the regional Partisan HQ led by General Ivan Gošnjak. They were briefed by the local British Liaison Officer (BLO), Captain Owen Reed, who took them to see the general. They started assisting the local doctors immediately, and a few days later, they were invited to a medical conference in Glina, some 100 km further north, a two days' journey. The conference, attended by Gojko Nikoliš, was interrupted by a German incursion, and the delegates moved to Topusko, and later to Slunj. The conference nevertheless continued and was addressed by Vladimir Nazor, a poet and politician who talked about medical staff sacrifices that he saw during the fighting.

=== Bosnia ===
Shortly after returning to Lika, Rogers got an invitation from Marshall Tito to come and see him at his Bosnian HQ at Drvar. The journey took a few days, combining a captured German car, horse riding and long marches on foot through deep snow. Rogers and his escorts passed through Babin Potok, Korenica, Udbina, Mazin and Martin Brod before reaching Drvar. Here, Rogers reported to the British Military Mission and met Brigadier Maclean, Randolph Churchill, Andrew Maxwell, Major John Clarke and a Signals officer called King.

The following day, together with Colonel Lavoslav Kraus, he reported to Marshall Tito, who wanted him to relocate to Bosnia and establish field hospitals there. Tito asked him how the Partisans could improve their medical situation. Speaking through an interpreter, (most likely Olga Humo), Rogers responded: "I told him the main needs were three. First, better food for the wounded. Second, evacuation to Italy where they could rest in peace and without the constant fear of attack and murder. And third, the wider dissemination of modern knowledge in the treatment of war wounds." Tito agreed and replied: "There are three things that I want you to do. Help our wounded here in Bosnia; ask, as only you can ask, that our wounded be evacuated from all over the country to Italy, and tell the world of our suffering."

Shortly afterwards, Maclean had told Rogers to take charge of a Military Mission at Petrovac relieving its American commander Linn "Slim" Farrish who had to go to Italy. Soon after Farrish left, some thirty downed American airmen, exhausted and sickly, arrived asking for evacuation via the nearby airfield, which was organised sometime later.

Rogers returned to his medical work and started operating both on wounded soldiers and local civilians at an improvised hospital at Ataševac. Ian McGregor left to join the Balkan Air Force and was replaced by Stanley Cameron. One day, they were visited by Gojko Nikoliš who told them that they would be running a "three-week course in surgery" for a group of Partisan doctors and nursing staff, picked from nearby brigades. The hospital was also visited by John Talbot, a Reuters correspondent, who told Rogers about the Anti-Fascist Youth Congress about to take place at Drvar. Rogers attended the Congress and listened to speeches by Tito, General Koča Popović and Randolph Churchill.

The area came under a frequent aerial bombardment as the Germans looked for Partisan convoys, field hospitals and a locomotive used to clear the local railway track with a snowplough. The hospital itself was bombed and all the patients, including the one "mid-operation" and unconscious, had to be dispersed in the surrounding forest. The following morning Drvar came under a large-scale airborne attack with gliders and parachute troops looking for Tito and his HQ. Unbeknown to Rogers, a meticulously planned and executed Operation Rösselsprung was underway. The following morning, Germans re-supplied their troops by parachuting more ammunition and mortar shells and Drvar fell. Tito and his HQ fled in time, and together with the British and Soviet Missions reached Glamoč, from where they were airlifted to Bari, Italy. Rogers and his team followed the same path.

=== Italy ===
Rogers spent the following few weeks running around between Bari and Naples, and preparing for his next mission. He raised the case for more sick and wounded Partisans to be evacuated to Italy, and a dedicated hospital for tuberculosis sufferers at San Fernando. By coincidence, his Canadian colleague and brother-in-arms, Doctor Colin Dafoe was also there. The two men "fought and operated" together in North Africa, and now they were both being sent to the Balkans, Rogers to Slovenia and Dafoe to Eastern Bosnia. Finally, with all their medical stores prepared and packed Rogers, Gillanders and Stanley boarded a DC-3 aircraft at Brindisi aerodrome on 14 July 1944 and few hours later parachuted to Črnomelj.

=== Slovenia ===
Rogers reported to the local Allied Mission, made up of a mixture of American and British officers, and waited for his assignment. They moved from Črnomelj to Semič and onto Ajdovec, visiting the field hospitals along the way. The hospitals had to be extremely well concealed as the German troops were never far away:

"After we had been walking the forest road for almost an hour, Igor stopped, as though searching for something among the small trees on the roadside. We pushed our way through the low undergrowth, covering our tracks with dead branches, and then found, leading off at right angles on the stony forest floor, a series of "stepping stones". Igor carefully turned each stone over, exposing its bare side for us to step on, and so we crossed from one to the next. Then, as we passed, the mossy surface would be turned back again so that no sign was left. Thus we went for fifty yards until we were well screened from the main route, and our track started again. This method of conspiration was repeated several times, and then another method adopted."

— Rogers, pp. 157-158

Finally, the trio got the agreement to open their own hospital in the forest near Ajdovec. Within a few days, Partisan carpenters had built the huts, bunks and shelves, ready to take the first patients. Very soon, a dozen of wounded soldiers arrived and needed to be operated on. The following weeks were spent in organising materiel drop-offs, evacuations of severely wounded and a short visit to Bari looking for more equipment. After his return, Rogers continued with his medical work, hiding from the Germans and arguing with Partisan Commissars. His dedication and competence did not go unnoticed and soon he was invited to meet Josip Vidmar and Boris Kidrič, the two most senior Partisan politicians in Slovenia. He was escorted by a courier into a deep forest and after a long walk arrived at the Slovene National Liberation Committee (SNOS). In addition to Vidmar and Kidrič, he also met Josip Jeras, the painter Božidar Jakac, the sculptor Nikolaj Pirnat and his ex-wife Nada Kraigher, Boris Kraigher and a popular Partisan commander called Franc Rozman "Stane". The gathering was also attended by a BBC journalist called Kenneth Mathews.

By November 1944, as the snow started and evacuation flights stopped, Rogers and Gillanders continued with their medical work. The concentration of German troops and Yugoslav quislings in the area continued to grow, as they were withdrawing from the south of the country. This put the field hospitals at an ever greater risk. The evenings were spent with some rest, talks and singing Slovenian songs. The wounded kept coming. Bill Gillanders and their theatre nurse Ivica started a relationship, and were determined to marry. However, the level of distrust towards the "capitalist" army representatives and the "communist" leadership of the country and the army grew. The accusations of espionage, in what was very dangerous and volatile time were common. The relationship between Bill and Ivica did not go much further as he was quickly repatriated. One evening, the news broke that the well-liked General Stane was killed while handling a PIAT grenade recently supplied by the British. He was replaced by General Dušan Kveder.

Rogers continued to work, this time alone. As the spring was approaching, he noticed increased German army activity. One Sunday, he decided to visit baths at the nearby Dolenjske Toplice and catch-up with its owner, Anna. Suddenly, Anna's house was visited by Gestapo, who insisted on searching it. She was able to push Rogers into a secret hiding inside the house, from where he could hear the conversation outside:

"Then the door opened, and the Gestapo entered the house. They went into the kitchen, four of them, their heavy boots echoing along the uncarpeted corridor. They looked into her cupboards and took all her glasses and knives and forks, and then came upstairs and went into the bedrooms. I pulled back the magazine of my automatic pistol and put down the safety catch, expecting every moment to be found. They opened her wardrobe and found some sheets and pillow cases. They took them, they took her clothes hanging on the hooks and her old possum skin coat, and then marched out of the house. I breathed again and changed position and put up the safety catch."

— Rogers, p. 249

== Aftermath ==
In early May 1945, as the war was nearing the end, Lindsay Rogers left Slovenia, his friends, colleagues and patients, who gave him a great send-off party. His work was hugely respected by the Partisans, their commanders and political authorities and he was awarded Order of Bravery of Yugoslavia and Order of Merit of Yugoslavia.

== Sources ==
- Deakin, F. W. D. (2011). The Embattled Mountain. London: Faber and Faber Ltd. ISBN 978-0-571-27644-8.
- Maclean, Fitzroy (1991). Eastern Approaches. London: Penguin Books. ISBN 978-0-141-04284-8.
- Rogers, Lindsay (1957). Guerilla Surgeon. London: Collins.
- Street, Brian Jeffrey (2005). The Parchute Ward. Brian Jeffrey Street. ISBN 1-4116-5360-2.
