= Peretz Rosenberg =

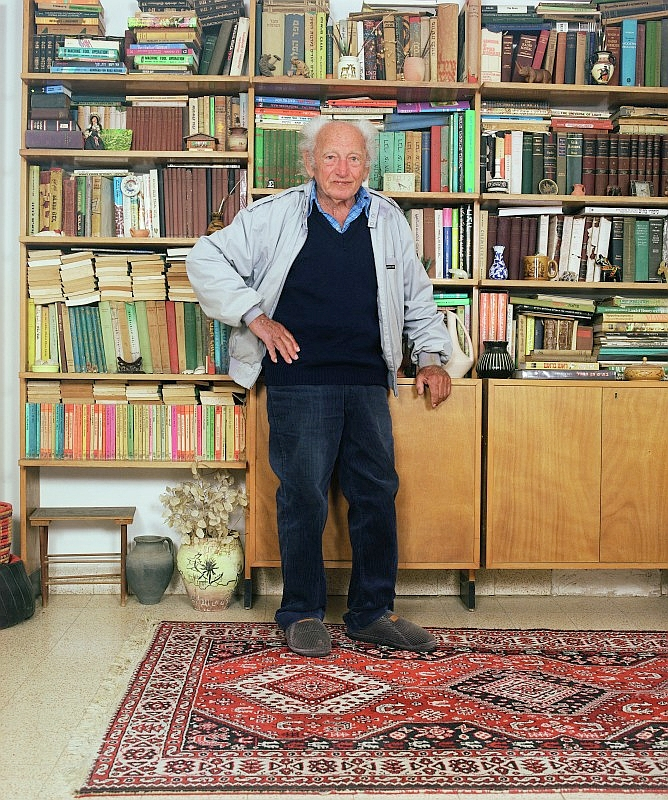
Peretz Rosenberg

Peretz Rosenberg (Hebrew: פרץ רוזנברג; September 11, 1919 - October 25, 2008) was one of the early parachutists of Mandatory Palestine. As the radio operator of special forces leader William Deakin, he was parachuted into Yugoslavia in 1943 on a mission to reach the headquarters of Tito. After World War II, he became head of the clandestine radio service of the Haganah. Rosenberg was the inventor of many agricultural water-saving devices.

== Biography ==
Peretz Rosenberg was born in Hungary while his parents, Yechiel Meir and Hella Rosenberg from Płońsk, Poland, were passing through en route to Palestine in 1919. David Ben-Gurion, later prime minister of Israel, was a frequent guest at his grandfather's house. The family settled in Jerusalem and then Tel Aviv. Rosenberg attended Herzliya Hebrew Gymnasium and joined the Haganah at the age of 16 where he gained expertise in wireless communications. In May 1939, he was sent to Romania as part of the Haganah's Gideonim unit to join the crew of the S.S. Atrato 7, an illegal immigration ship eventually seized by the British Mandate authorities near the coast at Shefayim and forced to sail to Haifa. Rosenberg managed to evade arrest by escaping in a supply van.

Rosenberg married Sarah Lieberman, daughter of Hebrew children's book writer Zvi Lieberman. The couple had three children, two boys and a girl. Their eldest son, Gideon, a physicist, was named for the Gideonim unit. The family initially lived in Moshav Nahalal, moving to a home of their own in Beit Shearim a few years later.

== Military and security career ==
As the German Afrika Corps approached Palestine and the country prepared for a possible German invasion (a period later known in Israel as the 200 days of dread), Rosenberg joined a group of twenty radio operators to hone his knowledge of Morse code in a training course of the Palestine Scheme (also known as the Moshe Dayan network), which operated under British auspices. In 1942, Rosenberg volunteered for the British army and traveled to British headquarters in Cairo together with Yaakov Shapira and Rehavam Amir to train Serbo-Croatian agents who were being sent to parachute behind enemy lines as part of the World War II British Commando operations. In February 1943, Rosenberg became an instructor at the signals training school in Egypt. The head of the Jewish Agency in Cairo instructed him to obtain information about the fate of Jewish communities in Yugoslavia. In May 1943, after undergoing paratrooper training, Rosenberg, using the code name “Corporal Rose,” was dropped in the vicinity of Zabljak in the Durmitor mountain range in Montenegro. He was part of a British commando and intelligence force under William Deakin tasked with linking up with the partisan group commanded by Josip Broz Tito, later president of Yugoslavia. Rosenberg served as the radio operator of the unit. It was the first joint SOE-SIS (Secret Intelligence Service) mission to Tito. In the mission, codenamed Operation Typical, six soldiers flew from Derna airfield on 27 May 27, 1943 and parachuted to Black Lake in Montenegro at the height of the German offensive known as Operation Schwarz whose objective was to destroy the partisan forces. The group was led by Colonel William Deakin and Captain William F Stuart, together with two radio operators, Walter Wroughton and Rosenberg. Due to his technical expertise, Rosenberg helped Tito's men maintain their communications equipment, which led to the establishment of close ties. In November 1943, Rosenberg attended the second conference of the Anti-Fascist Council for the National Liberation of Yugoslavia in the Bosnian town of Jajce where Tito proclaimed the council the supreme executive authority of Yugoslavia. From the conference, Rosenberg traveled back to the Adriatic coast with a group of wounded partisans. They boarded a British torpedo boat that took them to southern Italy, and from there they flew to Cairo. Rosenberg returned to Nahalal, where he was living at the time. After the establishment of the State of Israel, when the Israel Police was formed, Rosenberg was appointed head of communications operations.

== Arms development ==
In the early days of the 1948 Arab-Israeli War, Rosenberg served in the Science Corps of the Israel Defense Force and engaged in arms development. Aharon Remez, the first commander of the Israeli Air Force, requested his assistance in establishing a wireless communications system for aircraft. He was credited with the successful landing of a plane transporting weapons, Balak 1, at an abandoned British airstrip at Beit Daras in March 1948.

== Water conservation devices ==
Upon completing his electronic engineering studies at the Technion, Rosenberg returned to farming at Beit Shearim and began to design devices for irrigation and water conservation. One of his inventions was a timer for water taps which closed the tap automatically at a preset time, or shut down if low pressure was detected due to a burst pipe. Rosenberg went on to found Ein-Tal, a company specializing in advanced irrigation solutions for greenhouses, orchards and open field agriculture in arid and semi-arid climates. The company, later taken over by his son, is based in Caesarea.

== See also ==
- Jewish Parachutists of Mandate Palestine
- List of Israeli inventions and discoveries
- Science and technology in Israel
- Mossad LeAliyah Bet
