= Operation Fungus =

World War II Special Operations Executive Mission to Yugoslavia

Operation Fungus was one of the two Special Operations Executive (SOE) exploratory missions to Yugoslav Partisans during the World War Two. Both Operation Fungus and the second mission, Operation Hoathley 1, flew out on the night of 20 Apr 1943 from Derna airfield. The missions' objective was to establish who the Partisans were, who their leader was, and whether and how they could be utilised to further the Allies' military ambitions. They also served as each other's backup, in case one failed to reach the Partisans or fell into enemy's hands.

The mission consisted of an Anglo-Yugoslav British army soldier Alexander Simić-Stevens and two Yugoslav Canadians, Petar Erdeljac and Paul Pavlić, who were recruited by the SOE and trained in clandestine operations at Camp X on the Lake Ontario, near the US border. They carried two radio sets but no written instructions or identifiable uniform or rank. Prior to leaving, they were briefed by William Deakin, of Cairo SOE, who assured them that they would only be sent if the chances of success were realistic.

== Background ==
During the Second World War, both the SOE and its military counterpart, the SIS, operated in Canada and the United States in order to recruit European immigrants as potential agents for deployment in their native countries. The policy was approved as these were often bilingual young men who had escaped economic or political hardship in their homelands. Some had even fought in the Spanish Civil War on the Republican side.

Once selected, they were sent to Camp X for training and then dispatched to their respective regions. Those intended to infiltrate into Yugoslavia were sent to Cairo, in preparation for the parachute drop. Their main task would be the acts of sabotage on German communication lines and transport of oil, raw materials, troops and war materiel.

== The drop and the enlargement ==
The Fungus group was dropped "blind", without a prearranged rendezvous into Croatian region of Lika, near Drežnica. The intention was for them to connect with the local population and try and locate the Partisan troops. Previous SOE intelligence suggested that there were resistance fighters in the area. They were lucky, and shortly after landing they established radio contact with SOE Cairo HQ, confirming that they have reached the Partisan Command for Croatia at Brinje. Erdeljac was immediately recognised as an old comrade from Spain by the Croat commander Ivan Rukavina. Simić-Stevens on the other hand was thoroughly questioned by the political commissar, Vladimir Bakarić.

Once the Partisan leader, Tito, was informed via radio that the two British missions had arrived, unexpected and uninvited, he instructed the Partisan commanders to look after them and ensure that they did not "undertake some provocation which would compromise the Partisans in the eyes of the international public". This was in response to a previous mission, Operation Hydra, which resulted in death of two British officers, Maj Terence Atherton and Sgt Patrick O'Donovan, most likely at the hand of a royalist Chetnik in April/May 1942. In fact, Simić-Stevens, had been Atherton's assistant editor on the South Slav Herald for five years in pre-war Belgrade. For the other two members, who claimed Canadian Communist Party membership, Tito consulted the Comintern, who advised caution.

Simić-Stevens was allowed to contact Cairo regularly albeit under supervision from 28 Apr 1943. The HQ had asked if the Partisans would receive a British sabotage team in order to disrupt the railway lines. After a positive response, the first uniformed British mission to the Partisans arrived on 18 May 1943. The group consisted of Maj William Jones a 50-year-old Canadian, a Scots Fusilier Capt Anthony Hunter and Sgt Ronald Jephson, an RAF radio operator. Jones, a First World War veteran, previously wounded and with the use of only one eye quickly became popular with the local troops.

== Activities ==
Fungus team quickly became a radio-relay station between Tito's HQ in Montenegrin mountains and the SOE's Cairo HQ who were keen to expand the co-operation. On 17 May 1943, Tito agreed to receive a British mission at Partisan Supreme Headquarters (SHQ) and requested the RAF bomb Axis airfields and garrisons surrounding his troops. The mission, led by Deakin, was named Operation Typical and landed at Durmitor mountains on 28 May 1943, just as the Axis troops were tightening the encirclement of the SHQ, prior to the final push of their Operation Schwarz.

Around the same time, Jones went to Slovenia to focus on sabotaging the Ljubljana-Trieste railway, a strategic line of great importance for the Italian front which offered many good targets in shape of bridges and viaducts. Hunter remained in Croatia, commanding a patrol of L.R.D.G. Later, he moved onto Montenegro as a British Liaison Officer (BLO) to Peko Dapčević, the commander of the Second Proletarian Division. He was most likely the "British officer" who witnessed the Italian Venezia Division surrender to Dapčević at Berane in Sep 1943. He was killed later in Normandy landings.

== Sources ==
- Davidson, Basil (1946). Partisan Picture. Bedford: Bedford Books Ltd.
- Deakin, F. W. D. (2011). The Embattled Mountain. London: Faber and Faber Ltd. ISBN 978-0-571-27644-8.
- MacLaren, Roy (1982). Canadians Behind Enemy Lines, 1939-1945. Vancouver and London: University of British Columbia Press. ISBN 0-7748-0147-6.
- Maclean, Fitzroy (2009). Eastern Approaches. London: Penguin Group. ISBN 978-0-141-04284-8.
- Williams, Heather (2003). Parachutes, Patriots, and Partisans. London: C. Hurst & Co. (Publishers) Ltd. ISBN 1-85065-592-8.
