= Rehavam (given name) =

Rehavam or Rehoboam (Hebrew: רחבעם) is a masculine given name. Notable people with the name include:

- Rehoboam, king of the United Kingdom of Israel
- Rehavam Amir (1916–2013), Israeli ambassador, civil servant, and parachutist
- Rehavam Ze'evi (1926–2001), Israeli general and politician
