= Mission Dafoe =

World War II Special Operations Executive

Mission Dafoe was a World War II Special Operations Executive (SOE) medical and military expedition to Yugoslav Partisans in Eastern Bosnia. The group was led by Major Colin Scott Dafoe, a Canadian-born surgeon, and included two young British Sergeants; Frank, a trained operating-room orderly and Chris, an anaesthetist "with limited experience". Code named "Toffee" the mission left Bari airfield on 12 May 1944. and the trio was parachuted to their destination, the village of Čanići, where the Partisans, joined by Captain Wilson the local commander of the British Mission and the British Liaison Officer (BLO), were eagerly waiting.

== Background ==
As the Allies continued their advancement in southern Italy, it became logistically easier to assist anti-Axis fighters throughout the Balkans. By this time, Yugoslav Partisans led by Marshall Tito made significant wins and territory gains against both Italian and German war machines. The partisan warfare demanded agility and near-constant movement of troops which made medical provisioning very difficult. At the same time - frostbite, typhoid, scurvy, serious shrapnel and gunshot wounds required surgery, patient isolation and periods of hospitalisation, almost impossible to provide in such a volatile situation and affecting the soldiers' spirit.

"The morale of the army was shown to be dependent, in an intimate and mutual bond between the fighting Partisan and his wounded or sick comrade, on its ability to protect the defenceless and to preserve the unity and order of the whole main body under operational conditions."

— Deakin, p. 43

British Government eventually approved the sending of RAMC officers to help. One of the first ones in the field was Major Ian Mackenzie (RAMC), an experienced surgeon, who parachuted to Petrovo Polje on 15 August 1943. Three months later, he was followed by a New Zealand surgeon, Major Lindsey Rogers and his team - Sergeants William (Bill) Gillanders (RAMC) and Ian McGregor (RAF).

Dafoe knew Rogers as the two men were posted together in Tunisia in 1943. The fate would bring them together again, this time in a small village of Castellana, south of Bari, in April 1944, as both were preparing to go to the Balkans, Rogers for the second stint.

"Every day Dafoe and I were down to the store gathering up sufficient instruments and drugs to set up a reasonable well-equipped hospital over there. With my previous experience I as able to cut out a lot of unnecessary stuff and concentrated, after the bare surgical essentials, on clothes, soap, candles, lamps, and things which make a wounded man comfortable. As the years crept on, it became more and more apparent how little equipment one really needed in war surgery."

— Rogers, p. 135

== Arrival ==
After two failed attempts, caused by the bad weather, Major Dafoe, his assistants and their canisters with supplies finally landed. Once gathered, they were joined by Corporal Ernest Lincoln who took them to the Partisan 3rd Corps HQ in Dukići near Jadar. There they met Captain Wilson's interpreter, a Canadian miner called George Diklić who arrived in April 1943 as part of Operation Hoathley 1. The following day Dafoe realised that his carefully selected and packed medical supplies were being opened and distributed by the Partisans before he had a chance to assemble them into a functioning hospital. Furious, he asked to see the Partisan commander and protest. Assisted by Diklić, he was received immediately by the Generals Kosta Nađ and Jovan Vukotić, as well as their political commissar Vladimir Popović. The commanders apologised and instructed their Medical Officer, Doctor Moni Levi, to return the supplies. On his return, Dafoe met Mehmed Ramovic "Miki", a twenty-year-old student Partisan with good command of English, who became his local guide and interpreter.

== The first hospital ==
Dafoe was assigned to a large field hospital at the nearby village of Mihajlovići. Dr Levi took him there and introduced him Dr Ivo Baboselac, the elderly colonel in charge. He saw the wounded partisans malnourished and suffering from avitaminosis, lying on the floor in several peasant huts. He realised that most required urgent surgical attention and noted in his diary:

"The filth and uncleanliness of the patients, the rooms and even the surrounding grounds. Pigs seemed to be everywhere, wallowing in the mud. The smell of the latrines - or lack of them. The untidiness of the nurses. Admittedly they had suffered and nothing was stable. But that didn't explain everything. Why couldn't they even wash the patients?"

— Street, p. 73

The answer to his outrage was that "There is no medical materiel!".

Assisted by the local commissar, Marko Ivić, the group prepared their camp and built the tents and the fire pit. They were provided with horses and were able to visit nearby locations, including underground storage and shelter where the patients and nurses would be hidden during the enemy offensives. Dafoe was shocked with "the darkness, the damp, the shortage of food and potable water, the dismal sanitary conditions and the mental strain". There was a lot of work to be done. He instructed Marko to clean up the grounds, dig a latrine and cut a ditch to redirect a small stream that made the place muddy and attracted the wallowing pigs. He and his team, in the meantime, thoroughly cleaned up and disinfected the two operating rooms - floors, walls and ceilings. They started operating immediately after. The hospital by now had 150 beds, and a constant stream of new patients with fresh or long-neglected wounds often in need of amputation. They were joined by Jordana Herlinger "Jordy", the daughter of a famous surgeon Dr Ivo Herlinger who helped set up the hospital. Her mother Zlatka and sister Mira also came to visit, thanking Dafoe for taking Jordana "under his wing". Additional staff joined nurses as well as co-ordination commissars, including Milutin Đurasković "Đura". One day, Ismet Mujezinović, a famous artist introduced himself. Dafoe was glad that the two man could converse in French. The British medics quickly became well-known and were interviewed by J H C Talbot, a Reuters war correspondent who came to visit them. They were also invited to village fetes and gatherings. Here, Dafoe met Pop Savo Savić an Orthodox priest in charge of the nearby Lovnica church, as well as HQ's own priest Pop Blažo Marković.

== New hospital ==
Dafoe soon realised that the existing hospital was too cramped and dirty and that he would need to build a new one. The group selected a nearby plum orchard in which wooden beams and old parachutes were used to make two well-camouflaged new wards. There was an improvised "disinfection centre" outside where "heads were shaved, dirty clothes put through a disinfector, and patients bathed before being carried away to the orchard". One day, a US Flying Fortress crashed nearby. The pilots baled out, and the aircraft was soon stripped of anything useful. Even the surviving Perspex windows were repurposed for the new ward.

In late-June 1944, Dafoe and the team were visited by Ian McGregor, who left Rogers's mission and was now looking to secure an airfield nearby for the evacuation of wounded to southern Italy. It was quickly built near the village of Osmaci and Dafoe was told to triage the patients and move those ready to leave accompanied by Dr Baboselac. On the first night, eight DC-3s landed and took around 300 patients, on the second night more wounded fighters were evacuated, together with McGregor who had to continue his work elsewhere in the region. On the third night, three out of six air-planes turned back, but the remaining ones made it, and after much haggling managed to evacuate around 100 wounded, rather than 72 which was the original limit for the three aircraft.

== Visit to Lovnica and the first shoot-out ==
One morning, Miki took Dafoe to the old church in Lovnica, which had been damaged by enemy action, and an outbuilding which was turned into a makeshift Partisan hospital. Pop Savo welcomed the visitors to the church and showed them the frescoes, the damaged library and the visitors' book which among others had an entry by King Peter II of Yugoslavia. The priest also introduced his son, Brano Savić, who was a local Partisan commander. The word got around quickly, and the local villagers gathered and started dancing, now joined with Frank and Chris.

On a warm July day, a courier came over and warned Dafoe that a group of Chetniks was approaching the hospital and that they would need to evacuate. Sure enough, as the packing started and patients were prepared for the move, the enemy gunfire got much closer. Jordy and other nurses picked up the precious medical instruments and run into the hills, while other Partisans carried away the patients in their stretcher-beds to the underground shelter. Some patients were able to hobble away on their own. Dafoe came under fire himself and managed to shoot a few rounds from his Marlin pistol in response. Both Miki and he soon realised that their situation was hopeless and withdrew into the hills. Luckily, a brigade from the 3rd Corps HQ arrived and chased away the Chetniks. The following morning, the ransacked hospital was visited by Vladimir Popović who promised that it would be returned to function as soon as possible. True enough, Jordy and the nurses restored the site by the end of the day. Sadly, not long after due to enemy action, the whole area had to be abandoned again, and Dafoe and the team had to move into the mountains, leaving her and the patients in the underground shelter.

== On the run ==
Dafoe was soon getting used to the word "Pokret! (Get going!)" with which Partisans ordered the move of their troops, civilians, wounded and stockpiles. "It was a word that typified the Partisan organisation - always moving, seeking some way by movement out of their difficulties...ready to keep moving, if necessary, until the enemy dropped from exhaustion trying to follow them." The following weeks were spent wandering around in the directions of Kladanj and Vlasenica, under frequent enemy fire. Captain Wilson maintained radio-link with Bari and was able to arrange for a few DC-3 drops of food and materiel. Additional people arrived also, including Captain Gerrald Holmes, a new BLO for the Partisan 12th Corps. Sadly, his wireless operator, Corporal Straw died after his parachute got caught on the top of tall spruce. He was buried locally, with the service led by Pop Blažo Marković, and replaced later by Jeffrey Eden. As they continued to move, bad news came from the old hospital. The underground shelter had been discovered and all the patients and medical staff were mercilessly killed.

The risks were huge and at one point the column passed so close to the German troops that they had to move in silence - "wrapping the animal's hooves with shreds of clothing". Eventually, they were able to circle back towards Mihajlovići and visit the site of the ransacked hospital. Frank and Chris went with horses to look for instruments and material that was strewn around but could be salvaged. In the meantime, Dafoe agreed to assist the doctors Đorđe Dragić and Vlatko Ajzensteter who were running the 38th Division's hospital nearby. After performing some initial operations, dr Dragić invited him to meet the Division commanders - Majors Milos Zekić and Husein Krupić, Captain Zvonko Grakalić and their political commissar Vladimir Rolović. On one of the visits to the 3rd Corps HQ, Dafoe was introduced to their chief wireless operator Salom Šuica. The team was then told to move back to Čanići, the village they landed in May, sadly now burnt-out and "virtually unrecognisable".

Wireless schedules continued and Holmes and Eden reported that "the enemy was evidently moving toward the Adriatic" - expecting an Allied invasion. On 23 August, huge amount of gunfire and shouts of jubilation could be heard. The news broke that Romania had capitulated and that the Soviet troops are likely to march towards Belgrade. The enemy action continued and Dafoe's team together with the 38th Division and 3rd Corps moved to the high plateau of Milan Mountain.

== Onto Tuzla ==
The following few weeks were spent on a constant move, meandering between enemy troops and occasionally settling-down in small villages for the night. Medical work continued unabated and the team was told that they were going towards Tuzla. On 13 September, in the village of Tarovo, Dafoe gifted his silk-printed maps to his Partisan hosts, who greatly appreciated the gesture. They were now joined by the 27th Division and 11th Division who fought their way across Bosnia on their push towards Belgrade. After reaching the village of Skugrići, they were hoping to arrange an airlift of the wounded from a nearby plateau, but unfortunately, they ended up surrounded with Chetnik and German troops and had to break out once again. The City of Tuzla was liberated on 17 September. Doctor Dragić, whose family still lived there, insisted on escorting Dafoe into the city. The doctor was recognised by the local crowds who started gathering around the new arrivals. Finally, they managed to reach his old house, where his mother, wife and son were waiting to greet them. Dafoe and Grakalić spent the night there while looking for a more formal accommodation.

As the situation stabilised, a new 200-bed hospital has been prepared, and Dafoe was expected to run it. Unfortunately, he was recalled to Italy and flew out of Osmaci in mid-October. Before he left, Vladimir Popović presented him with a medal, "The Order of Service to the People" set against a silver wreath.

== Epilogue ==
Dafoe had not forgotten his initial shock at the first Partisan field hospital he had seen. Speaking on the CBC on 13 August 1945 he added:

"Here we saw the results of total war in gruesome detail - a sight which I still find hard to believe. In about twenty, one-room peasant houses were crowded together 350 seriously wounded Partisans. They lay on bare wooden floors, with closed windows. They were crowded together for warmth with but only one blanket for every two patients... Most pitiful of all was the fact that about one-third of the patients were women and young boys; for by the beginning of 1944 nearly 25% of the Partisan army consisted of women... The death rate at the hospital was about six per day."

— MacLaren, pp. 152-153

== Sources ==
- Deakin, F. W. D. (2011). The Embattled Mountain. London: Faber and Faber Ltd. ISBN 978-0-571-27644-8.
- MacLaren, Roy (1982). Canadians Behind Enemy Lines, 1939-1945. Vancouver and London: University of British Columbia Press. ISBN 0-7748-0147-6.
- Rogers, Lindsay (1957). Guerilla Surgeon. London: Collins.
- Street, Brian Jeffrey (2005). The Parchute Ward. Brian Jeffrey Street. ISBN 1-4116-5360-2.
- Williams, Heather (2003). Parachutes, Patriots, and Partisans. London: C. Hurst & Co. (Publishers) Ltd. ISBN 1-85065-592-8.
