= Operation Hoathley 1 =

SOE intelligence-gathering mission in Yugoslavia during World War II

Operation Hoathley 1 was one of the two Special Operations Executive (SOE) exploratory missions to the Yugoslav Partisans during World War II. Both Hoathley 1 and the second mission, Operation Fungus, flew out on the night of 20 April 1943 from an airfield Derna, Libya. The missions' objective was to establish who the Partisans were, who their leader was and if and how they could be utilised to further the Allies' military ambitions. They also served as each other's backup, in case one failed to reach the Partisans or fell into the enemy's hands. The mission consisted of three Yugoslav Canadians who were recruited by the SOE and trained in clandestine operations at Camp X on the Lake Ontario, near the US border. It was led by Stevan Serdar who was joined by George Diklić and Milan Družić. They wore no identifiable uniform or rank.

== Background ==
During World War II, both the Special Operation Executive (SOE) and its military counterpart, the Secret Intelligence Service (SIS), operated in Canada and the United States in order to recruit European immigrants as potential agents for deployment in their native countries. The policy was approved as these were often bilingual young men who had escaped economic or political hardship in their homelands. Some had even fought in the Spanish Civil War on the Republican side.

Once selected, they were sent to Camp X for training and then dispatched to their respective regions. Those intended to infiltrate into Yugoslavia were sent to Cairo, in preparation for the parachute drop. Their main task would be the acts of sabotage on German communication lines and transport of oil, raw materials, troops and war materiel.

== Drop ==
The Hoathley 1 group was dropped "blind", without a prearranged rendezvous into Eastern Bosnia, near town of Šekovići. The intention was for them to connect with the local population and try and locate the Partisan troops. Previous SOE intelligence suggested that there were resistance fighters in the area. They were lucky, and shortly after landing they were able to join the Partisan Bosnian Corps at the Javornik mountain. On 11 May 1943 their first signal was picked up in Cairo, reporting their safe landing and that they were on the run. They had become a part of a complex and brutal civil war and the war against the invaders.

== Engagement ==
Once Partisan leader Josip Broz Tito was informed via radio that the two British missions had arrived, unexpected and uninvited, he instructed the Partisan commanders to look after them and ensure that they did not "undertake some provocation which would compromise the Partisans in the eyes of the international public". This was in response to a previous mission, Operation Hydra, which resulted in death of two British officers most likely at the hand of a royalist Chetnik in April–May 1942. For those who claimed Canadian Communist Party membership, Tito consulted the Comintern, who advised caution.

All three members of the group were miners, able to use explosives competently. They also investigated and reported on Chetniks' collaboration with the Germans near Zvornik, and the Italians near Višegrad in May 1943.

== Merging into Operation Typical ==
One month after the two missions had landed, the first official, and uniformed, SOE/SIS mission was dispatched from the same airport on 27 May 1943. Led by Colonel William Deakin and named Operation Typical, they joined Tito's headquarters and followed him out of the encirclement at Tjentište. Deakin met up with the group in Kladanj on 28 June 1943 and merged them into his mission. The enlarged group now had three radio sets and were able to communicate with Cairo with better resilience, as regular schedule had to be kept. This enabled them to organise further military aid drops in the area.

On 7 July 1943, Serdar used recently dropped British plastic explosive to interrupt rail transport of coal, hoping to deprive other trains of fuel and frustrate enemy's troop movements. On 18 July and 29 July 1943, he witnessed and reported on the destruction of parts of the strategic Sarajevo–Višegrad line. On collaboration with the occupiers, they further reported on 29 July 1943 that the German command were using Chetniks as auxiliaries, for attacks on the Partisans and for guarding the railway near Tuzla. On 15 August 1943, they reported that some Chetniks were armed with German rifles and supplied by food and pay.

== Sources ==
- Davidson, Basil (1946). Partisan Picture. Bedford: Bedford Books Ltd.
- Deakin, F. W. D. (2011). The Embattled Mountain. London: Faber and Faber Ltd. ISBN 978-0-571-27644-8.
- Williams, Heather (2003). Parachutes, Patriots, and Partisans. London: C. Hurst & Co. (Publishers) Ltd. ISBN 1-85065-592-8.
