= Operation Bullseye =

World War II Special Operations Executive Mission to Yugoslavia

Operation Bullseye was the code-name of the first Special Operations Executive (SOE) mission to Yugoslavia since its occupation by the Axis forces. It was led by Capt D.T. Bill Hudson with the objective to discover what was happening in Yugoslavia and co-ordinate all forces of resistance there. The mission also included three Royal Yugoslav Army (RYA) officers from Montenegro: Maj Mirko Lalatović, Maj Zaharije Ostojić and Sgt Veljko Dragićević the wireless transmitter (W/T) operator. The group boarded the submarine HMS Triumph in Malta and reached Petrovac on the Montenegrin coast on 20th Sep 1941.

== Background, logistics and the first contacts ==
The quick and intense Axis Blitzkrieg Operation Punishment in April 1941 had caught Yugoslav government and the army unprepared. Within a fortnight, the army had capitulated, King Peter II and the Royal Government left for exile in London together with the SOE agents posted in the country. Disjointed snippets of news of uprisings, resistance and civilian suffering were reaching both British and Yugoslav Government-in-Exile (YGE) who realised that they needed a more comprehensive picture and had arranged for a direct mission to the region. Col S.W. (Bill) Bailey, Head of the SOE Balkan section, instructed Hudson to contact all resistance, regardless of national, religious or political belief.

Given the pressures of the North African campaign, lack of available aircraft and distance from the Egyptian airfields, it was decided that the infiltration would be done by a submarine. Julian Amery, an SOE agent and the son of L.S. Amery, then Secretary of State for India, stated that it was his father's intercession that made a submarine available.

Capt Hudson was a 31 year-old consultant mining engineer who had lived in Serbia for several years before the war. He was fluent in the language and had valuable experience of conditions there. Maj Lalatović was a Royal Yugoslav Air Force (RYAF) officer who had flown with a squadron of planes from Nikšić (Montenegro) via Greece to Cairo in April 1941. Maj Ostojić was on the General Staff of the RYA who escorted Prince Paul to Greece in April 1941 and then travelled onto Cairo.

Once disembarked, the party were picked up by local partisans and taken to Radovče north of Podgorica. Using one of the two available radio sets, they reported to the SOE W/T station in Malta on 26 Sep 1941 that they were met by a local band, led by Arso Jovanović and 'professor' Milovan Djilas. On 9 Oct 1941 Hudson received a signal from Cairo (via Malta) to move to Suvobor in Western Serbia and deliver safe ciphers to Col Draža Mihailović and his Chetnik movement who had been sending un-encrypted radio messages. It was at this time that the two different approaches to resistance and its timelines between the communist partisans and nationalist chetniks became apparent. On 13 Oct 1941 Lalatović and Ostojić sent the message to Malta (in French):

"Colonel Mihailović is receiving orders to refrain from sabotage except against railway tracks, locomotives, etc., where explosives are not needed, so that the population will not be too exposed to reprisals. The group has been ordered to confine itself for the time being to preparations and collecting material with the aim of coordinated and well-organized action at a moment which will be ordered later."

— Deakin, p. 132

Three days later, Hudson, on his way to Serbia, sent the following telegram:

"The communists who are well organized are now leading an action in Montenegro. They want everybody to unite in the fight against the occupying authorities. Numerous national elements are standing on one side and are waiting. Must urge on nationalists to organize for the struggle."

— Bullseye telegram, No 25, 16 Oct 1941, Deakin, p. 131

== Locating local resistance leaders and attempts at reconciliation ==
The mission was accompanied by Jovanović and Mitar Bakić - another senior Montenegrin communist, and via partisan held territories in Sandžak and Western Morava valley reached Užice around 25 Oct 1941 where they met partisan leadership including Josip Broz Tito, their commander-in-chief. Shortly afterwards Hudson moved to Mihailović's HQ at the village of Brajići near Suvobor. His host was aware of his reports favourable of Montenegrin partisans and threatened to break off relations in case Hudson intended to go to Užice again.

In Brajići, Hudson was a bystander during the talks between Mihailović and Tito, and had realised that the two cannot reconcile easily. Mihailović, encouraged by the reports of Ostojić and Lalatović that he had the official backing of the YGE, and promise of British aid, demanded the partisans submit to his command. He also believed in biding his time until his movement was strong enough to destroy the communists, resist the Germans without the fear of reprisals or the Anglo-American allies had invaded the region. Tito, on the other hand, demanded an immediate fight against the occupiers, no subordination but common operational activities with chetniks or at the worst - their promise that they would leave partisans alone in their war against the Germans. The talks failed.

On 29 Oct 1941 Mihailović sent a telegram asking for help "while the weather is good" so he could form an army corps "in a short time" and gave the impression that an offensive against the Germans was imminent. At the same time, spurred by his advisers, especially the two new arrivals, he instigated chetnik attacks on partisans near Užice on 2 Nov 1941. One week later, on 9 Nov 1941, he received the first British aid sortie from Malta.

Fearing the escalation of conflict between the two groups, and worried that the military aid would be used to fight partisans rather than the Germans, on 13 Nov 1941 Hudson asked for it to be suspended unless Mihailović attempted to incorporate all anti-fascist elements under his command. He volunteered to go to Užice to assist and asked the British Government to influence partisan leadership to work under Mihailović's command via Radio Moscow message which was broadcast shortly afterwards.

On 20 Nov 1941 Hudson was present at chetnik-partisan negotiations in Čačak, reporting that "partisans are stronger" and have "no confidence in Yugoslav officers who were responsible for the collapse". He also stated that Mihailović would "first liquidate partisans with British arms, before turning seriously to the Germans". Shortly afterwards, he left Mihailović's HQ to visit Tito at Užice, just as the Germans had attacked the city in Operation Užice on 29 Nov 1941. He followed partisans' withdrawal via Zlatibor mountain range, all the way to Uvac and then decided to return to Mihailović at Ravna Gora on 8 Dec 1941. His host, who reported him missing to London on 1 Dec 1941 was about to withdraw towards Montenegro. He refused to see Hudson and denied him the use of radio communications, finally leaving him behind as a lone fugitive in peasant clothes.

Cut off from the outside world, Hudson made his way to southern Serbia and spent the following four winter months in Ivanjica surviving mainly on potatoes and fully dependent on local population. Worried about his fate, in Feb 1942, the SOE organised Operation Hydra, led by Maj Terence Atherton to discover what had become of him. Sadly, Atherton was killed two months later, and it was Hudson who ended up investigating his "rescuer's" murder instead.

== Rapprochement with Mihailović ==
Around the same time, in Apr 1942, Mihailović contacted Hudson and asked him to join his HQ in Sandžak. Hudson accepted and traveled mainly in Italian run lorries. London was informed of his survival, promoted him to the rank of Major and awarded him the Distinguished Service Order (DSO) in Jun 1942. The following few months, Hudson spent inspecting local chetnik units and reported on their commanders' frequent collaboration with the Italian occupiers.

In Aug 1942, Lieut Lofts and two British W/T operators arrived in order to provide more regular and secure communications with Cairo and London. This enabled both Mihailović and Hudson to make their cases separately. The former ignored questions about partisans' strength and locations and refused to take sabotage action on the Belgrade-Niš railway while trying to conceal his collaboration with the Italians while the latter was preparing the 'tell all' report.

In early Sep 1942, Hudson reported:

"In general, the partisan organization is miles ahead of Mihailović's, and, after chasing each other round Yugoslavia, the final scene will probably take place in Belgrade. Mihailović intends to set up a military dictatorship after the war, and this had been accepted by the Montenegrin leaders since the communist withdrawal from this region (in the spring of 1942)."

— Deakin, p. 152

Even after the direct appeal by General Harold Alexander (Commander-in-chief of the Middle East Command) to sabotage Axis communications, Mihailović refused to act. Finally, after living in the country for over a year, on 15 Nov 1942, Hudson sent a considered summary on the situation:

- Mihailović is dependent on local commander Pavle Djurišić, whom he has secretly promoted and supported financially and endorses his policy of collaboration with the Italians. Sabotage against Italians would lead to reprisals and termination of their support and food supplies. Mihailović insists that the Italians will collapse shortly.
- Chetniks in Serbia could organize derailments at points where the Germans would not be able to take reprisals on Serb villages, but no serious attempts have been made to investigate the possibilities of this. The poor sabotage results are due to lack of willingness on Mihailović's part and the lack of energy. It should be made clear to Mihailović that continued support to him from the BBC is dependent on his readiness to undertake sabotage.
- Once satisfied that the final victory is certain, Mihailović will join the 'grand finale' against the Axis, until then he is capable of coming to secret understandings with either Italians on Germans. I do not know whether Mihailović has an agreement with the Axis involving his inactivity in Serbia or their anti-communist drive in North West Bosnia.

== Mission expansion ==
In addition to enhanced communication channels, towards the end of 1942, the SOE sent a high ranking official (Head of SOE Balkan section) Col S.W. (Bill) Bailey to co-ordinate all SOE activities in the region (including Albania, Hungary, Romania and Bulgaria) and report on the military value of chetnik movement as a whole. He was also to persuade Mihailović to undertake active sabotage, study his political intentions and propose how British policy of creating a united resistance front could be implemented.

Similar to Hudson, Bailey was a mining engineer with pre-war experience in Yugoslavia. In early 1942, he was on a mission to the USA and Canada, together with Capt William Stuart from the SIS (who later became co-chief of Operation Typical and was killed during German bombardment of Tito's HQ in May 1943), trying to recruit Yugoslav ex-pats for potential engagement in the Balkans. Many of the recruits already had military experience in the Spanish Civil War, and were sent to Britain, and later to Cairo for further training.

Bailey parachuted to Mihailović's HQ at Gornje Lipovo (Montenegro) on 25 Dec 1942. One of his tasks was to improve the relations with Mihailović by informing him of events outside the country (esp. in North Africa) and how these had largely been responsible for the meagre flow of aid so far. He was also to convince Mihailović to fit into the overall Allied strategy of being regional communications centre should the Allies be forced to evacuate the Middle East. In his earliest communications, Bailey concurred with Hudson's opinion on the impossibility of reconciling Mihailović and the partisans or his collaboration with anti-Axis groups in Croatia, who were not under his command. He also reported that about 4,000 professed communists led by Tito had proclaimed an 'independent republic' at Bihać, supported by another 10,000 fighters who could potentially switch their support to Mihailović later. Given the irreconcilability of the two groups, Bailey proposed partisans move to Croatia, leaving all Serbian-majority areas to Mihailović's command. That way the two armies should have little to fight over and would focus on fighting the Axis instead. He warned that Mihailović would accept the loss of British support in pursuit of the liquidation of partisans in Serbian territory. The Foreign Office realised that the plan could lead to the breakup of Yugoslavia after the war, and it was never put in action.

Overall, early reports indicated that Bailey got off to a good start with Mihailović, who agreed to receive British sub-missions to his regional commands, such as Mission Greenwood-Rootham in Eastern Serbia, and pass agents onto other countries. It turned out that Hudson's standing with Mihailović was much better than he had anticipated. Unfortunately, Bailey's inability to pause BBC broadcasts praising the partisan resistance, or to increase the supply drops (affected by the lack of serviceable long-range aircraft and poor weather) meant that the relationship began to deteriorate quickly.

Finally, at a christening in Lipovo, on 28th Feb 1943, Mihailović made a speech highly critical of "perfidious Albion", requiring the Serbs to fight to the last, without adequate aid, his only source of supply being the Italian occupiers. He stated that his main enemies were the "partisans, Ustashas, Muslims and Croats - in that order" - and only when he had dealt with them, he would turn his attention to the Germans and the Italians. Bailey reacted on the spot and later reported the content of the speech to London which caused a major furore between the British Government, YGE and Mihailović whose list of priorities was in reverse order of what was expected. This led to a near-complete breakdown of the relationship between the British mission and Mihailović.

== Switching the support ==
In Mar 1943, as the Axis troops and their collaborators pushed partisan forces from Bihać in North-west Bosnia to Herzegovina in the south, Mihailović left his HQ to take direct command, and spent the next few weeks in Kalinovik, Konjic and Foča. On 6 Apr 1943, Bailey reported that chetniks were openly collaborating with the Italians in Foča area and that Mihailović had refused all access to the British mission.

Around the same time, the Axis defeat at Stalingrad and North Africa, made the collaboration with resistance groups in the Balkans more important. British PM Winston Churchill had obtained ten Halifax bombers to add to the four Liberators and ease the delivery of military aid and in Apr 1943 sub-missions with Mihailović's commanders throughout Serbia were established. On 27 May 1943, Operation Typical, the first dedicated mission to partisans' HQ was dropped at the height of a large German offensive Operation Schwarz which aimed to destroy them. Both missions by now had American (OSS) representatives, Bailey's had Capt Mansfield, and Deakin's had Lieut M.O. Benson.

Over the next few months, the situation remained complex. Mihailović continued to collaborate with the Italians and remained focused on fighting the partisans. His troops refrained from attacking the Axis for fear of reprisals and he was still unhappy about the lack of British aid. Partisans, on the other hand, continued to fight Germans, Italians, Ustashe, Chetniks and others, while professing their commitment to the Soviet cause. The British government then decided to back both sides with equal support, sending a senior officer to each HQ, Brigadier Charles Armstrong to Mihailović and Brig Fitzroy Maclean to Tito.

The two brigadiers arrived at the time of Italian surrender and saw the two armies' behaviour in its aftermath. At Berane, place of Venezia Division's HQ, its commander General Oxilia agreed with Mihailović's representative and Bailey to come over to Allies' cause together with his troops and arms. Tito's 2nd Proletarian Division, led by Peko Dapčević, arrived shortly afterwards and persuaded Oxilia to join the partisan side instead. This was seen as a great loss of reputation, arms and territory by Mihailović.

Armstrong was present on 5 Oct 1943 when Mihailović's troops overtook the German garrison in Višegrad allowing Maj Archie Jack to blow up a large railway bridge nearby. Together with blowing up of four railway bridges at Mokra Gora this was the first significant and overt anti-German action by Mihailović's troops since the beginning of the war, although in Bosnia rather than Serbia as originally planned. BBC broadcast attributed successes of Mokra Gora and Višegrad raids to partisans, further angering Mihailović, who returned to his previous priorities of fighting partisans and ignoring the occupiers and the British Liaison Officers (BLOs).

On 8 Nov 1943, the British Foreign Minister Anthony Eden met King Peter II and the new Yugoslav PM Purić and told them that the British intended to ask Mihailović to carry out certain specific military operations and that a failure to accede to this request would stop British aid. The task was to destroy railway bridges in the Ibar and Morava valleys. Mihailović had agreed, but the request was withdrawn at the last moment. At the same time Churchill had access to intercepted highly secretive German messages and thus knew that the partisans continually resisted and fought. On 10 Dec 1943, he declared that he wanted Mihailović removed by the end of the year. Two months later, on 25 Feb 1944, he sent a message to Tito informing him that the British missions were being withdrawn from Mihailović.

== The withdrawal ==
As ordered, both Bailey and Hudson left Mihailović's HQ for Cairo via Bari. Bailey travelled via Mihailović's sympathisers to the coast and was evacuated on 14/15 Feb 1944, Hudson who travelled via partisan's town of Berane left on 28 Mar 1944. Their withdrawal from the region meant the end of Operation Bullseye after two and a half years.

Sgt Veljko Dragićević, who had offered to stay with the Montenegrin partisans in Sep 1941, had been persuaded not to do so. His hosts were worried that his officers would think that they had brainwashed him. Instead, he joined them two months later and eventually became a Communications Chief at the Supreme Headquarters. Sadly, both he and his wife were killed during the Operation Rösselsprung, the German raid on the town of Drvar on 25 May 1944.

== See also ==
- Stolice conference, 26 September 1941

== Sources ==
- Davidson, Basil (1980). Special Operations Europe, Scenes from the Anti-Nazi War. London: Victor Gollancz Ltd. ISBN 0-575-02820-3.
- Deakin, F. W. D. (2011). The Embattled Mountain. London: Faber and Faber Ltd. ISBN 978-0-571-27644-8.
- Djilas, Milovan (1980). Wartime With Tito and the Partisans. London: Martin Secker & Warburg Limited. ISBN 0-436-12971-X.
- West, Richard (2009). Tito and the rise and fall of Yugoslavia. London: Faber and Faber Ltd. ISBN 978-0-571-25581-8.
- Williams, Heather (2003). Parachutes, Patriots, and Partisans. London: C. Hurst & Co. (Publishers) Ltd. ISBN 1-85065-592-8.
