= Africa (1984 TV series) =

1984 television documentary series

Africa: A Voyage of Discovery was a series about the history of Africa with Basil Davidson. It was produced in a collaboration between Channel 4, the Nigerian Television Authority and RM Arts in 1984 and consisted of eight parts in four episodes. The film received the Gold Award from the 1984 International Film and Television Festival of New York. Each part is around an hour long.

- Different But Equal
- Mastering of a Continent
- Caravans of Gold
- The King and The City
- The Bible and the Gun
- The Magnificent African Cake
- The Rise of Nationalism
- The Legacy
