= Rehavam Amir =

Israeli ambassador, civil servant and former parachutist

- רחבעם עמיר
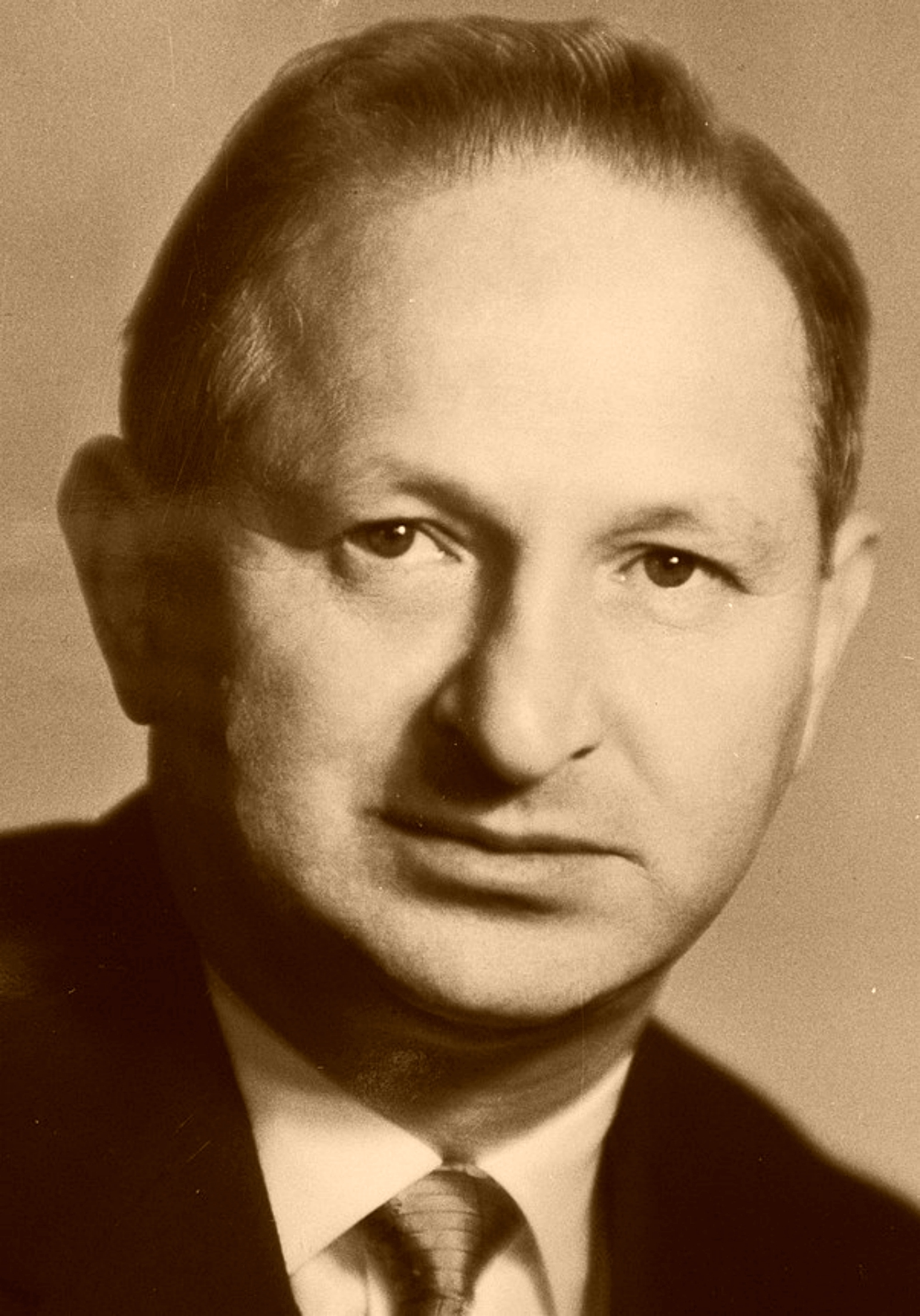
- Rehavam Amir, civil servant and former parachutist

Israeli Ambassador to the United Kingdom
- In office 1953–1958

Israeli Ambassador to Poland
- In office 1958–1961

Israeli Ambassador to Thailand
- In office 1971–1975

Israeli Ambassador to Finland
- In office 1979–1982

Personal details
- Born: Rehavam Zabludovsky; January 1, 1916 Vilnius, Lithuania
- Died: April 4, 2013 (aged 97)
- Citizenship: Israel
- Spouse: Avital Brandstatter

Military service
- Branch/service: British Army
- Years of service: 1941-1944
- Rank: Lieutenant
- Unit: Special Operations Executive

Rehavam Amir (Zabludovsky) (Hebrew: רחבעם עמיר; January 1, 1916 – April 4, 2013) was an Israeli ambassador, civil servant and former parachutist with the Hagannah.

== Biography ==
Rehavam Zabludovsky (later Amir) was born in Vilnius, Lithuania (then under German occupation). His parents were Malka (née Silman) and Yitzhak-Eliezer Zabludovsky. He studied in a Tarbut High School and continued to the Teachers' College in Vilnius. In 1935, having received an Aliya certificate sponsored by his uncle, the poet Kadish-Yehuda Silman, Rehavam came to Eretz-Israel, then Palestine under the British Mandate. He arrived in Jerusalem and stayed with relatives in the neighborhood of Beit HaKerem. There he completed his studies in the local Teachers' College under the directorship of Ben-Zion Dinur. Upon graduating, Rehavam went to teach in Yavne'el (then a frontier settlement) in Galilee, where he met his wife, Avital Brandstatter. In 1939, he moved to Tel Aviv and taught at the Gretz Elementary School.

== Military career ==
Amir joined the Hagannah in late 1936. He participated in one of the Hagannah's first wireless operators' courses that was conducted clandestinely in kibbutz Ayelet HaShahar in Upper Galilee. While teaching in Yavne'el, Amir served as the contact between Yavne'el and Hagannah headquarters.

In 1941, Amir was requested to head a Hagannah communication course held in the Oriental Bazaar in Tel Aviv for members of the Moshe Dayan Network. Participants in the course were taught professional wireless operations by experts such as Peretz Rosenberg. Upon completion of the course, Amir was invited to the home of Eliyahu Golomb, head of the Haganah who told him about the possibility of being sent beyond enemy lines in Europe. He was asked whether he would be willing to go as a British soldier to reach the Jewish communities in occupied Europe.

In the winter of 1941 he was sent to British HQ in Cairo where he established a school for wireless operators whose trainees were Yugoslav volunteers from Slovenia who had been captured by the British in the Western Desert. Amir's Hagannah commanders, Eliyahu Golomb and Reuven Zaslani (Shiloah), supported the venture. Thus Amir returned to Cairo in February 1942 to command the course and undergo further training. He completed a parachutist course conducted by the British "Inter-Services Liaison Department" (ISLD), a cover name for MI6.

Over the following months there were various delays in carrying out the mission. Only in October 1943, about a month after his marriage to Avital, did his orders come through. Amir boarded a boat from Alexandria to Bari in Italy. Once there, he made contacts with other units from Eretz-Israel already stationed in Salerno. He transferred to them money from the Jewish Agency. Back in Bari in late December, he boarded a Motor Torpedo Boat (MTB) that took him to the isle of Vis in the Adriatic Sea. This was the only island in the Adriatic to be under the control of Tito's Partisans or Allied forces. There he joined another ISLD representative and they set up direct radio contact with HQ in Bari. During Amir's three-month stay on the island he made contact with various forces that passed through, amongst them other volunteers from Eretz-Israel, commandos, as well as a group of two hundred Jewish refugees from Yugoslavia who had been assisted by the Partisans to reach Vis. Amir told them about the soldiers from Eretz-Israel and the refugee camps that had been established in the liberated area in southern Italy. He assisted their transfer to Bari and to the camps.

In the spring 1944, Amir returned to Bari in preparation for his original mission. He was promoted to Lieutenant. During the night of May 12/13, 1944, Lieut. Allan, as Amir was known by his code name, parachuted into the "Fourth Zone", an area south-east of Lubliana, Slovenia, under Partisan control, but surrounded by the Germans. Amir's official assignment was to find a lost British mission that had previously parachuted into the area, but had gone astray and had not been contacted. He was also assigned to improve the radio communications systems at the Partisans' headquarters and to further train them in communications and encoding. He was also instructed to establish independent wireless contact with the HQ in Bari and, unofficially to find fleeing Jews in order to help them escape to safety and freedom. Amir spent the summer months with the Partisans, marching from camp to camp. In September 1944 he left for Bari but returned to Slovenia with further technical equipment and supplies. At the end of 1944, having been three times behind enemy lines, Amir returned to Eretz-Israel.

Looking back upon the tasks Rehavam Amir said:

We were all of a generation that had been educated to fulfill the missions that were thrust upon us. I do not remember one of our fellow emissaries who looked for publicity or craved a battle. Most of us were young regular guys ... each and every one of us regarded [the mission] as a great privilege and unhesitatingly answered – Yes!

Amir remained in the SHA"I (the Hagannah Intelligence Service), at first in Tel-Aviv and later in Haifa. While in Haifa he was also headmaster of the Reali elementary school. Upon the establishment of the State of Israel in May 1948, he was appointed Military Governor of Acre and the Western Galilee.

== Diplomatic career ==
Rehavam Amir joined the senior ranks of the Foreign Ministry as head of Personnel/Administration. In that capacity he was responsible for the logistically complex operation of transferring the ministry from Tel-Aviv to Jerusalem in the summer of 1953. This was carried out in one night with everything - all offices and departments - functioning the following day.

In August 1953, Amir was appointed Israel's Consul-General to the United Kingdom. Together with his wife Avital and daughters Shulamit and Dalia, the family moved to London for five years.

In late 1958, Amir was appointed Head of Israel's Legation to Poland. It was during this period that evidence of the Holocaust was being uncovered and the sites of the extermination camps were as yet hardly known. Amir and his diplomatic staff were amongst the first Jewish visitors to the camps after World War II. At this time, Poland's PM Władysław Gomułka enabled Jews to leave Poland. Having completed another three years tour of duty in Poland, Amir returned home to Israel and held several posts in the Foreign Ministry. In 1963, he transferred to the Prime Minister's Office upon his appointment as David Ben-Gurion's Advisor for Arab Affairs. Upon Ben-Gurion's resignation he continued to work with PM Levi Eshkol. In 1964, Amir coordinated the visit of Pope Paul VI to Megiddo and Nazareth.

From 1965 to 1968 Amir served in the Jewish Agency as Director of Jewish Education in the Diaspora. In 1968 he returned to the Foreign Ministry and served as Israel's Consul-General in New York City until 1971.

From 1971 to 1975 Amir served as Israel's Ambassador to Thailand. In December 1972, Amir's talents and competency were once again put to the test when the PLO's Black September attacked the Israeli embassy in Bangkok and took all the occupants as hostages. Rehavam and Avital were attending a ceremony at the Royal Palace thus they were not among the hostages and could therefore conduct the negotiations with the kidnappers. Following the intense negotiations, including the King of Thailand's personal insistence that no blood be shed, and with the rare and courageous cooperation of the Egyptian Ambassador, (at the time Israel had no relations with Egypt), the hostages were finally released without use of force or anyone being hurt.

In 1975, returning to Israel once again, Amir was appointed Chief of Protocol responsible for official visits of foreign dignitaries: US President Jimmy Carter and Egypt's President Anwar Sadat's historic visit to Jerusalem in 1977. From 1979 to 1982 Amir served as Israel's Ambassador to Finland.

Upon retirement from the Foreign Ministry, Amir continued to be active for many years, voluntarily advising Teddy Kollek, Mayor of Jerusalem, serving on the Board of the David Yellin Teachers' College, ERA"N and the Board of Governors of Ben-Gurion University of the Negev.

== See also ==
- Jewish Parachutists of Mandate Palestine

== Sources ==
- Interviews with Avital and Rehavam Amir
- Mission of Hope, Ministry of Defence, 1995, p. 19-28. (in Hebrew)
