= George Paloczi-Horvath =

George Paloczi-Horvath (1908–1973) was a Hungarian writer, best known for his 1959 autobiography book The Undefeated.

He was born in 1908 to a privileged Hungarian family. As a young journalist, he reported on the rise of fascism in Europe and became a dedicated anti-Nazi. When the German army marched through Budapest in 1941, he fled the country under an assumed name, ending up first in Cairo and, after the war, in London. He returned to Budapest in February 1947, where he edited a magazine and joined the Communist Party. But he was soon arrested as a spy, and spent the next five years in prison. He was subjected to solitary confinement and torture. He was finally released in 1954, and after the Hungarian Uprising in 1956, he left the country for good.

Paloczi-Horvath settled in Richmond, London with his family, and earned his living as a freelance writer and journalist. He published The Undefeated in 1959; the book won the Atlantic Editors' Non-Fiction Prize and the Prix de la Liberté, and has been reprinted by Eland Books. He also wrote political biographies of Nikita Khrushchev and Mao Zedong.

He died of a heart attack in 1973.
