= Mission Lindsay =

World War II Office of Strategic Services Mission to Yugoslavia

Mission Lindsay was a World War II Office of Strategic Services (OSS) military expedition to Yugoslav Partisans in Slovenia, sent in May 1944. The group was led by Major Franklin Lindsay and included Lieutenant Gordon Bush, Lieutenant Schraeder - the weather officer, and Corporal James Fisher - the radio operator. It was a part of the wider, Maclean Mission, which arrived in September 1943. The mission left Brindisi airfield in an RAF Halifax bomber and together with cargo of guns, explosives, radios and medical supplies parachuted in Dolenjska, near the village of Semič on 14 May 1944. The fifth member, Corporal Edward Welles, was left behind in Italy in order to assemble the additional equipment that the group would ask for, once they had arrived to Slovenia. Eventually, he joined them in mid-August.

The primary purpose of the mission was to disrupt railway transport between Northern Italy, Austria (still part of the Third Reich), Hungary and the Balkans. Reducing the movement of troops, weapons, fuel and raw materials (such as oil, bauxite, copper, zinc, lead and chrome) would damage German military ambitions and its war industry. They were to execute this via sabotage and demolition - blowing-up railroads, bridges and viaducts throughout their assigned area.

== Background ==
As the Allies continued their advancement in southern Italy, it became an imperative to reduce German reinforcements and resupplies coming from Eastern and South-Eastern Europe. The Slovenian Alps were an ideal natural barrier to these movements, with Ljubljana Gap making a narrow strait. At the heart of it was Zidani Most, a railway junction where three key branches of the railroad met, linking Germany with Port of Trieste and the Italian front as well as Hungary, Romania, Serbia and Greece. Any disruption here was bound to harm the Third Reich's military might.

"Our immediate mission was to cut the rail lines that run through the Southeastern Alps, in order to block the transfer of German reinforcements from Austria, Hungary and the Balkans to the Italian front, as the Allied armies approached Rome and pushed further north. With their advance, the blocking of those same lines would later become a key to helping bottle up German divisions in the Balkans.

— Lindsay, pp. 10-11

Schraeder was sent to set up a weather observation station near the local airfield used by Luftwaffe. This was to provide the Allied air forces with a better picture of the weather over German-occupied Europe in order to assign next targets to their bombers. It would also enable Allied meteorologists to compare the observations with the encrypted German ones taken at the same time and location, thus help break the German military weather codes.

"This would make it possible to read all of the German weather reports from occupied Europe as soon as they were sent, a feat I later heard was ultimately accomplished.

— Lindsay, p. 34

== Arrival ==
The quartet landed safely, together with their equipment and were picked up by the local Partisans, who escorted them to their headquarters. There they met Captain James Goodwin, an American head of the Allied Liaison Mission, and Lieutenant George Wuchinich, a Serbian-American OSS officer. They agreed with the local commanders that they would progress further north into Styria, which was officially still part of the Third Reich and get closer to the key railroads. They were accompanied by a young Partisan lieutenant, Vlado Valenčak, as an interpreter and link with the locals, and a British Lieutenant Dan Gatoni, who was searching for a Major McNeff of MI-6 who had gone to the region previously but was not heard from.

They passed the village of Maravce, and after a short rest reached a farm near Gornji Grad on 6 June. There they met local commander, Viktor Avbelj "Rudi" and secured a parachute drop location before moving to Pohorje, into safer, higher and less populated mountainous area. Here they found Major McNeff, as well as Vuchko Vuchkovic who was sent by the Special Operations Executive (SOE) during the previous winter and had not been heard from since. In the meantime, Lieutenant Bush went on a separate expedition further south to try and damage the mainline railway link between Zagreb and Ljubljana.

== Blowing up the railroads and first reviews ==
Upon reaching the regional HQ, the team joined local Partisan commanders in poring over the maps and choosing the most suitable targets for their operation. They chose the key dual-track line that linked Austria with Italy, as well as its single-track western branch. If they were successful that would leave only one, single-track connection to Treviso, the line that was already full to capacity. The targets were: a 350-foot stone viaduct near Mislinje, a 700-foot tunnel at Lipoglav and two bridges, one at Zbelovo, the other at Tremerje. They also received a "four bombers" worth of drop of explosives and tools.

Partisans wanted their own demolitions unit, consisting of former miners experienced in handling explosives, to lay down the charges. Mislinje viaduct was patrolled by the German troops, who had 1,700 men in the 6 miles radius - most of whom could reach it within 30 minutes. This night they were surprised not to have encountered guards on the viaduct. They dug up holes next to the three of the seven massive stone columns that held it up. They buried 650kg explosives into them, and used further 200kg at the arched top of the nearby tunnel, wired it up and detonated it.

As soon as the explosion was heard, the Partisans opened fire onto the nearby garrison to prevent the Germans from counter-attack. Once the dust had settled, they noticed that the three columns were damaged but remained standing. Still under German cross-fire, they were able to reload the remaining 250kg of explosives and detonate it an hour later. This finally toppled them and the railway was no longer usable or easily repairable.

The other three targets were even more challenging. They were heavily guarded, and required the removal of the German troops prior to the intervention. The bridge at Zbelovo remained standing as the 150kg charge did not explode but merely burned out. The one at Tremerje was also standing as the brigade was "too weak and poorly armed to overcome the garrison". Finally, with the tunnel at Lipoglav, the Partisans were more successful and were able to execute two smaller explosions, one at each end and put it out of use for a few weeks.

It soon became obvious that the actions were not as effective as they should have been and that a huge risk and loses in being in position to lay down the explosives, were not followed by a good demolition work. In its report, the local Partisans reported

"The entire operation was well conceived, yet badly executed. The preparations themselves were poor. The demolition job was completely overlooked. No calculations were made as to the amount of explosives needed for the demolition of specific objectives... It also became clear that the miners are still incapable of executing such works, that they are not trained sufficiently for it, and that demolition of such targets is still beyond their powers."

— Lindsay, p. 86

Despite this, the Partisans were able to completely block the railroad for five weeks at the height of the summer 1944 war. Meanwhile, Lieutenant Bush returned and confirmed that his group had managed to block the southern mainline for a week by "filling deep cuts with rock blown down by explosive charges from either side".

== First liberated area ==
The following weeks were spent on the move, actively escaping German expeditions and encirclements, which made it difficult to organise further air-drops. Eventually they ended up in Upper Savinja Valley and by 3 July managed to get a drop from a single aircraft at Mozirska. Corporal Welles finally arrived in mid-August, together with a British SOE officer - Major Roberts who was a part of Lieutenant Colonel Peter Wilkinson's group intended for infiltration into Austria.

In time, Lindsay got an opportunity to understand the Partisan movement and meet some of its key political and military leaders, including Mile Kilibarda, Jože Borštnar, Alojz Kolman Marok, Dragomir Benčič Brkin and Franc Primožič. They were mainly part of the 14th Division, which was now strengthening the Partisan presence in Styria. Once, he asked Aleš Bebler, a prominent local leader, how they gained the confidence and support of the local population. His response was that it took at least six months to "prepare the people politically before any armed units could be sent".

"Preparing the people politically meant sending in clandestine workers who would recruit civilians into the Liberation Front, hold small secret meetings, recruit informers in the local police and military units, and gradually build a supportive underground structure. It also meant creating a secret counterintelligence organization to uncover and eliminate enemy penetrations into the Partisans' own organization."

— Lindsay, p. 110

Encouraged by their successes, the division commanders decided to attack German garrisons in Luče, Ljubno and Gornji Grad on 30 July. In order to prevent German reinforcements, they blockaded and mined roads, bridges and the local railroad, and launched a diversionary attack on the Litija garrison, some twenty miles south. The attacks were successful and had created the very first liberated territory inside the Third Reich itself. On 13 August, they attacked and destroyed the German garrison at Rimske Toplice and cut-off an important railroad.

On 19 August, the mission received instructions from Brigadier Fitzroy Maclean, which was in fact Marshall Tito's order to be forwarded to the local Partisan commanders, concerning Operation Ratweek – a co-ordinated all-out attack on the rail and road communications across the Balkan. The order was sent via SOE channels in order to prevent it from being intercepted by the Germans. The objective was to ensure that the 24 remaining German divisions south of Slovenia are unable to withdraw towards Germany and aid the resistance to Soviet and Anglo-American troops attacking from the East, South and West of the Third Reich.

The mission agreed the key local targets with the Partisans for the operation scheduled to start on 1 September. These included a bridge and rock cuts on the main Vienna line, and five kilometres of track they would remove and destroy. They were still very short of explosives, with Lindsay constantly reminding the supplier - "Unless you get explosives to Fourteenth Div their action will be minor. They plan to attack again tunnel and bridge but can't do it with bare hands". In the end, the explosive had been delayed and the operation was limited - some tracks were cut, retaining walls destroyed and three smaller bridges were blown. After the June's intervention - tunnels and bridges were much better guarded. Finally, Lindsay arranged for the Allied air-attacks to destroy key bridges at Maribor and Zidani Most.

On 11 and 12 September, the Partisans launched a successful attack on Mozirje and two other nearby garrisons expanding the liberated the whole valley. In late October, large German troops entered the valley, and torched the houses and stole the livestock. Upon their retreat, those whom the Partisans were able to capture were sent to their barracks stripped of their clothing and boots.

== Attempt to expand into Austria ==
Being well inside the Reich's territory the mission was an excellent launch pad for penetrating into Austria and Hungary. It was with this in mind that Lt Col Peter Wilkinson and Major Alfgar Hesketh-Prichard procured Tito's approval for the new destination. In May 1944, Lt Col Charles Villiers was dropped to the area and together with others, worked with the local Koroska Odred to make contact with the Austrians. Additionally, Captain Charles Fisher arrived with twelve men in September the same year in order to strengthen the link, together with the senior local Partisan commander Franc Leskošek Luka. After many attempts, no Allies-friendly group in Austria could be identified or contacted and the attempt failed.

== Strained relationship ==
As the 1944 was nearing the end and both Anglo-American and Soviet troops were making great progress towards Berlin, it became likely that the Partisans would want to expand their territory not only to the pre-1941 border, but also incorporating nearby areas of Austria and Italy with significant Slovene and Croatian population. This was in direct conflict with the allied plans for the two countries. While the mission was mainly interested in reporting on German large troop and materiel movements able to impact situation on the Western or Italian fronts, the Partisans were living day-by-day focusing on the small incursion and local German troops that were causing them the most danger. Additionally, the Partisans were aware of the American military missions to their royalist Chetnik troops and were concerned about the information going back to their enemies via this route.

Finally, a mixture of ideological differences, wartime distrust, fear of espionage, poor weather and difficult communication and logistic channels led to disagreements and misunderstandings. This was explained in one of the Force 399 memos:

"The following are the principal snags which have hindered us supporting Frank [Lindsay]:

(a) Weather - Stajerska [Styria] is a notoriously bad weather area;

(b) Range - 60 Group has been unable to reach Stajerska from Brindisi and 267 Squadron is normally committed elsewhere. The squadron has no bomb racks [to carry rifles and machine gun containers] and they cannot be fitted without withdrawing aircraft from service for 120 hours."

— Lindsay, p. 186

== The German defector ==
On 24 October Lindsay received the instruction to prepare for a high-secrecy mission to Zagreb and arrange the surrender of the German Lt General Edmund Glaise von Horstenau, their military plenipotentiary there. The mission had been agreed with Lt Col Howard Chapin and Col Ellery Huntington and approved by Tito. His current tasks would be handed over to a British officer, Captain Douglas Owen. On 6 December, in the mist of a German offensive, Lindsay, Ed Welles and Jim Fisher started their perilous overland journey to Zagreb. After a few days of snow covered paths they crossed the river Sava and reached Trebnje, after which they continued onto Slovenian HQ at Semič.

There they met other Maclean Mission representatives, Captain Jim Goodwin and Lt Col Peter Moore, who debriefed on the state of play in the local area. They also pointed out that the Partisans' approach towards them was deteriorating. Yugoslav capital, Belgrade, had been liberated two months prior with the aid of the Soviet Red Army, and the communist leaders of the movement became more vocal in their support.

On 18 December, they continued their journey crossing into Croatia and eventually reaching the town of Glina, where they were picked up by an American representative who drove them to the Croatian HQ at Topusko to join OSS Lt Col Lanning "Packy" McFarland whose jeep was delivered via a C-47 landing few days before. They also met the local Partisan commanders, Ivan Gošnjak and Vladimir Bakarić, who had informed him that General Glaise had been arrested by the Gestapo two weeks earlier and is no longer contactable.

Lyndsey spent the following couple of months with the British Mission at Topusko, headed by Major Randolph Churchill:

"The Partisans were flattered to have the prime minister's son with them but they were put off when he told them what he thought of them, which was seldom flattering. He was one of the most aggressively rude men I ever met. He once told me that whenever anyone was rude to him he was immediately three times as rude in return. He was sure to win out. No one could possibly best him."

— Lindsay, pp. 235-236

On 19 February 1945, Lyndsey was flown out to the Allied HQ at Caserta, Italy and told that his new post would be to replace Lieutenant Colonel Charles Thayer as head of the American military mission in the recently liberated Belgrade.

== Belgrade mission ==
Lindsay arrived to war-torn Belgrade and met his mission commander, Brigadier MacLean, for the first time, noticing that the British officers had "many close school and family ties". He also realised that the alliance with the Partisan hosts had further deteriorated and became formal, and there were "no longer close and friendly relations that had existed in the early days in the forest".

On one occasion, he participated in a luncheon given by the US General Ira Eaker, where he met the head of the Soviet military mission Major General A F Kiselev, Tito's chief of staff, Arso Jovanović as well as Tito himself. General Eaker also brought Thornton Wilder, as a cultural adviser for the Partisan's production of Wilder's play "Our Town".

By now the local US military mission provided much of political, economic and order of battle reporting. It consisted of Navy Lieutenant Robert Miner, Captain Eugene O'Meara, academics and local language experts Michael Petrovich and Alex Vucinich, as well as Sergeant Yeiser and Captain William Cary. From there, they observed and reported on the establishment of the new Yugoslavia and its interim government.

== Trieste crisis ==
As the end of the war was in sight, the Partisans made it clear that they considered large part of the former Austro-Hungarian province of Venezia Giulia populated with significant Slovene and Croatian population an inalienable part of the future Yugoslavia. Additionally, some saw their claim to the territory as the winning side of the Second World War, analogous to its annexation by the Italians after the First World War. The area, in their view, covered Istrian peninsula, and the cities of Rijeka, Pula, Gorizia, Trieste and Monfalcone.

In late February 1945 Field Marshall Harold Alexander visited Tito in Belgrade and agreed the future demarcation line between the two armies and understanding that the Port of Trieste, and all the northbound rail and road communications would be under his control and disposal. This was crucial to the Allied advancement into Austria and Germany.

Nevertheless, Yugoslav Fourth Army entered the territory and established itself on the left bank of the river Soča all the way down to its estuary, taking over all the key cities. In order to avoid significant conflict, Alexander sent his chief of staff Lieutenant General William Morgan and Brigadier General A L Hamblen to Belgrade to ask the demarcation follow the rail/road line between Trieste and Austria with the Yugoslavs withdrawing their troops two to ten miles to the east of it. Their newly formed civilian authorities to the west would remain in administrative power. The talks were also attended by Air Vice Marshall A S G Lee, who had replaced Fitzroy Maclean as head of the British military mission. Lindsey drafted the common agreed conclusions signed by both sides. The agreement established the Morgan Line.

The situation was complex, as Yugoslavs demanded the full political and military control of the Venezia Giulia province, including Trieste. Their arguments were numerous. In their view, they had liberated the territory from the Germans, suffered tremendous losses at the hands of the Italian and German occupation forces, there was a significant Slovene and Croat population in the area and Italy had only held it by the right of conquest at the end of the First World War. On the international level, they had compared it to the Allies' rights to occupy or annex parts of Germany. They had also believed that Stalin and the Soviet Union would support them, which turned out not to be the case. Stalin had bigger issues on the demarcation line between the US and Soviet forces inside Germany as well as his assistance to the Italian Communist Party, which had a wide support and could possibly win the elections. Eventually, the territory was split between the two countries, with Italy retaining Trieste with its surroundings and Yugoslavia incorporating the remaining area.

In June 1945, the US Military Mission in Belgrade closed and Lindsey was appointed political adviser to General John Harding, the military governor of the Trieste territory, at the castle of Duino. He continued there until moving to Paris to work for Averell Harriman, the European head of the Marshall Plan.

== Epilogue ==
Ever since leaving Styria on 6 December 1944, Lindsay was anxious to find out what happened to those he left behind. Eventually he was able to meet up with Robert Plan, one of the survivors and locate Captain Owen's radio messages.

German attack on the Partisan units was carried out by the notorious 13th SS Mountain Division on 4 December in an attempt to reclaim the area which they had lost in August. Three days later they had taken Mozirje, and Rečica landing strip the following day. The Partisans had dispersed into the higher levels of the mountains with only one remote drop area at Mala still under their control. On 15 December, Owen signalled that they were on emergency schedule at Menina Mountains. By then, the whole Savinja valley was recaptured by the Germans who pretended to offer an amnesty to those who surrender. Those who did were locked up in Luce and summarily executed shortly afterwards.

Major Matthews, Lieutenant Edward Parks, Captain Charles Fisher and his radio operator Robert Plan, Owen and his radio operator Campbell were still there. Germans had used 15,000 battle-hardened troops, while Partisan numbers fell under 2,000 fighters. The situation was getting desperate with the mixture of constant movement, deep snow and bad weather conditions, which meant that the first aid with radios, batteries, clothing and food was dropped on 20 February 1945 - more than two months after the offensive had started. During that time, Matthews, Parks, Fisher, Hesketh-Prichard, Rosenfeld and Knoth were all killed, the latter two as wounded in Partisan hidden hospital in Mozirske Planine - a unit of the 14th SS Division discovered it and set it alight with the wounded still inside. Eventually, the Partisans were able to regain the initiative and return.

== Sources ==
- Djilas, Milovan (1980). Wartime. London, England: Martin Secker & Warburg Limited.
- Lindsay, Franklin (1993). Beacons in the night: with the OSS and Tito's partisans in wartime Yugoslavia. Stanford, California: Stanford University Press. ISBN 0-8047-2123-8.
- Maclean, Fitzroy (2009). Eastern Approaches. London: Penguin Group. ISBN 978-0-141-04284-8.
- Williams, Heather (2003). Parachutes, Patriots, and Partisans. C. Hurst & Co. (Publishers) Ltd, London, ISBN 1-85065-592-8
