= Franklin Lindsay =

Franklin A. Lindsay (12 March 1916 – 13 October 2011) was an American spy and business executive. Lindsay graduated from Stanford University in 1938 and ended up working for the Office of Strategic Services during World War II. During the war, as the head of Mission Lindsay, he parachuted to the Slovene Partisans in 1944 and worked with them to blow up the rail lines in Southern Austria. Later, he became head of the military mission to Tito. He wrote a book about his wartime experiences, Beacons in the Night, and has been awarded Slovenia's highest decoration.

After the war, he became involved in a wide range of government and private sector activities. In the public sector, he was a member of the US Atomic Energy Commission to the United Nations; he helped set up the European side of the Marshall Plan and helped fellow OSS member Frank Wisner establish the Office of Policy Coordination (OPC). As part of his work with the OPC, he recruited Ukrainian Nazis to carry out assassinations of rival spies in German misplaced person camps. This was done of the codename "Operation Ohio". In an interview on his activities in a 1962 Foreign Affairs article, he justified terrorism, propaganda, and a police state to dominate society against factional threats. The operation was tied to false flag terrorism.

In the private sector he spent time at the Ford Foundation, McKinsey & Co., and as head of Itek, a high tech company, which, among its products, developed the camera's for satellites that overflew the Soviet Union and scouted the moon and Mars. He also served on the Senate Intelligence Advisory Committee, chaired the committee for Economic Development's program and policy committee and chaired the board of the National Bureau of Economic Research.

After his retirement, he started a seven-year stint helping Ukraine's International Management Institute turn its curriculum towards a market economy. While in Kyiv, he also worked with Ukraine's National Security Council and helped develop a program for Ukraine's military officers and national security officials at Harvard Kennedy School. The program continues today in an expanded form to include not only participants from Ukraine but also from the other countries surrounding the Black Sea.

He is survived by his wife Margot, two children, and three granddaughters.
