= Colin Scott Dafoe =

Canadian surgeon

Doctor Colin Scott Dafoe (21 November 1909 – 29 July 1969) was a Canadian surgeon, best known for his work with Marshal Josip Broz Tito's Partisans in Yugoslavia during the Second World War. His three-men medical team was parachuted to Eastern Bosnia on 12 May 1944, and he remained in the country for the following six months. Mission Dafoe was a World War II Special Operations Executive (SOE) medical and military expedition to assist Yugoslav Partisans in Eastern Bosnia.

Dafoe was born in Madoc, Ontario, the son of a prosperous hardware merchant. The Dafoe family was well established in the area and had already produced one visibly successful son in John Wesley Dafoe, editor-in-chief of the Manitoba (later Winnipeg) Free Press from 1901 until his death in 1944. There were also at least two notable physicians in the family: an uncle, Dr William Allan Dafoe, who was to influence Colin Dafoe's decision to pursue a medical career, and Dr W.A Dafoe’s son Dr Allan Roy Dafoe, who later moved to the northern town of Callander, Ontario, where he would rise to international celebrity as the country doctor who delivered the Dionne Quintuplets on May 28, 1934.
