= Operation Typical =

World War II Special Operations Executive Mission to Yugoslavia

Operation Typical was the name of the first British mission of the Second World War fully assigned to the Yugoslav Partisans HQ and Marshal Tito, organised by the Special Operations Executive (SOE). Six soldiers flew from Derna airfield on 27 May 1943 and parachuted to Black Lake in Montenegro at the height of a large German offensive, Operation Schwarz, that aimed to destroy the Partisan forces. The group was led by Col William Deakin and Capt William F. Stuart, together with the two radio operators – Sergeants Walter Wroughton and Peretz 'Rose' Rosenberg. Canadian-Yugoslav Ivan ('John') Starčević acted as a translator and Sgt John Campbell (RM) was a cipher clerk and bodyguard.

== Purpose ==
I was to explain to the Partisan leadership the point of view maintained by G.H.Q., Middle East, namely that the war in the Mediterranean has reached a stage in which Allied offensives may be considered imminent and the synchronization of the Partisan effort therefore becomes desirable. My further instructions were to arrange for the Partisan forces to attack specific targets on enemy lines of communication with supplies and, if necessary, British personnel provided by us; to report on the military situation in the country and advise us on the selection of targets; and to convey the wishes of G.H.Q., Middle East, to the Partisan G.H.Q. and to report the point of view maintained by them.

— William Deakin

The mission insisted on sabotage operations, offering explosives and, if necessary, British demolition experts. The selection of targets varied, from disrupting German supplies to North Africa by cutting off the railway line to Greece, to shipments of Romanian oil and Yugoslav minerals (e.g. copper, chrome and bauxite) to Germany.

== Route ==
Deakin and the team followed Partisan HQ across the Durmitor range ending up in German, Italian and Bulgarian encirclement under heavy bombing. On 9 June 1943, Stuart was killed in an air-raid while Tito was wounded in the shoulder. The party broke through the encirclement at Tjentište in the middle of the night and informed Cairo HQ on 13 June 1943.

By the end of June they arranged timings and locations for the explosives and medical aid to be parachuted, while they moved onto Olovo, Kladanj and Vlasenica. On 30 July 1943 they reached Bijela Voda near Žepče, where Deakin witnessed and reported on the destruction of 14 km (8.7 mi) of railway tracks. By 4 August, the party reached plateau of Petrovo Polje, where they were able to welcome additional SOE officers being parachuted. Flight-Lieutenant Kenneth Syers (RAF) who came to replace William Stuart and the surgeon, Major Ian Mackenzie (RAMC) on 15 August and the following day, Major Basil Davidson, who was to command Mission Davidson. For safety, the group had to move to Jajce on 25 August 1943.

== Italian surrender ==
In the Armistice of Cassibile, the Italian army surrendered to the Anglo-American forces in Italy on 8 September 1943. Soon after, th British G.H.Q. instructed the mission to negotiate an armistice and carry out the disarming of the Italian troops, which was rejected by Tito who demanded the Italians surrender to the Partisans. The main race was towards Split, the Italian HQ, with the aim of disarming the Italians before the German troops reclaimed the region. On 11 September 1943, Deakin, with an American, Capt M. Benson, left for Bugojno, to join Gen Koča Popović and the 1st Proletarian Brigade on their way to Split. They arrived on 16 September 1943, and found Gen Becuzzi, the commander of the 15th Infantry Division "Bergamo" with 14,000 disarmed soldiers. Deakin and Benson, together with Lt John Burge, witnessed Becuzzi signing the terms of surrender.

After a brief speech to the citizens of Split in the main square, translated by Ivo Lola Ribar, Deakin and Wroughton returned to Jajce via Sajkovići, Grahovo and Drvar.

== Mission expansion and failed evacuation attempt ==
On 26 September 1943 Deakin reported to the recently arrived Brigadier-General Fitzroy Maclean, in Mrkonjic-Grad. The new commander, heading Maclean Mission (Macmis) felt that Deakin, after three months at Tito's HQ "should give us a better idea than anyone of what the partisans were worth". The two officers continued to assess partisans' strength, willingness to fight and aid priorities.

As German troops started to recapture the Dalmatian coast and the islands, Maclean decided to go to Cairo and agree the further course of action. He agreed to take Ribar and Miloje Milojević as emissaries of good will, subject to the Commander-in-chief and Foreign Office approvals. Maclean left Jajce for Cairo on 5 October 1943 where he presented Anthony Eden with a written report of his findings, before returning to Italy to organise the evacuation of Ribar and Milojević from an improvised airstrip at Glamoč. During Nov 1943, Maclean made three sorties trying to find and land there but each time the snowstorms, fog and thick clouds forced him to return. By now, the partisans were getting impatient and had organised their own mission in a recently captured German airplane. On 27 November 1943 as they were trying to board, the airplane came under bombardment and Ribar, together with two British officers was killed and the mission abandoned.

== Completion ==
Knowing that the airstrip was likely to be lost to the Germans, Maclean procured a troop-carrying Dakota and landed there on 2 December 1943. Without switching off the engines, they were able to take in Deakin, Anthony Hunter, Vladimir Velebit and the severely wounded Milojević and Vladimir Dedijer. Finally, they took a German Abwehr officer, Capt Meyer, who was taken prisoner at Jajce earlier. The first landing operation in German-occupied Yugoslavia had been completed, bringing Operation Typical to an end.

== Sources ==
- Deakin, F. W. D. (2011). The Embattled Mountain. London: Faber and Faber. ISBN 978-0-571-27644-8.
- Maclean, Fitzroy (2009). Eastern Approaches. London: Penguin Group. ISBN 978-0-141-04284-8.
