= Basil Davidson =

British journalist and historian (1914–2010)

Basil Davidson MC
- Born: Basil Risbridger Davidson; 9 November 1914; Bristol, United Kingdom
- Died: 9 July 2010 (aged 95); London, United Kingdom
- Occupations: Journalist and writer
- Spouse: Marion Young (m. 1943–2010)
- Military career
- Allegiance: United Kingdom
- Branch: Secret Intelligence Service; Special Operations Executive
- Service years: 1939–1945
- Rank: Lieutenant colonel
- Conflicts: World War II
- Awards: Military Cross; Mentioned in despatches

Basil Risbridger Davidson MC (9 November 1914 – 9 July 2010) was a British journalist and historian who wrote more than 30 books on African history and politics. According to two modern writers, "Davidson, a campaigning journalist whose first of many books on African history and politics appeared in 1956, remains perhaps the single-most effective disseminator of the new field to a popular international audience".

== Biography ==
=== Early life ===
Basil Davidson was born in Bristol, United Kingdom on 9 November 1914 and left school at 16 and moved to London. In 1938, he gained a job as the Paris correspondent of The Economist and later as the diplomatic correspondent of The Star. He travelled widely in Italy and Central Europe in the 1930s.

=== Wartime service ===
Davidson was recruited by the Secret Intelligence Service (SIS) and MI6, D Section. As part of his Mission, he was sent to Budapest, Hungary in December 1939 under the cover of establishing a news service. In April 1941, with the Nazi invasion, he fled to Belgrade, Yugoslavia. In May, he was captured by Italian forces and was later released as part of a prisoner exchange.

From late 1942 to mid-1943, he was chief of the Special Operations Executive (SOE) Yugoslav Section in Cairo, Egypt, where he was James Klugmann's supervisor. He parachuted into Bosnia on 16 August 1943, and spent the following months serving as a liaison with the Partisans, as he would describe in his 1946 book, Partisan Picture. Davidson moved east into Srem and the Fruška Gora in Yugoslavia. He was nearly captured or killed several times. SOE posted him to Hungarian occupied Bačka to try to organize a rebel movement there, but Davidson found that the conditions were unsuitable and crossed back over the Danube into the Fruška Gora. The Germans encircled the Fruška Gora in June 1944 in a last attempt to liquidate the Partisans there, but Davidson and the others made a narrow escape. After Soviet forces entered into Yugoslavia, Davidson was airlifted out. Davidson had enormous appreciation for the Partisans and the communist leader Josip Broz Tito.

From January 1945, Davidson was liaison officer with partisans in Liguria and Genoa, Italy. He was present for the surrender of the German forces in Genoa on 26–27 April 1945. He finished the war as a lieutenant-colonel and was awarded the Military Cross and was mentioned in despatches on two occasions.

=== Africa and writing career ===
Davidson returned to journalism after the war. He was employed initially by The Times in Paris but was widely considered to have communist sympathies after his wartime role as the Cold War began. He left in 1949 and became the secretary of the pressure-group, the Union of Democratic Control (UDC) and began to work for the left-leaning New Statesman. However, the Cold War prevented him from returning to Central Europe and instead Davidson became interested in Africa after being invited to South Africa by trade unionists opposed to Apartheid. He published several articles and books critical of white-rule in South Africa and colonial rule in Africa, passing to the Daily Herald (1954–57) and the Daily Mirror (1959–62).

He began a career as a popular writer. He published five novels and 30 other books, mainly on African history and politics. These consolidated his reputation in the United Kingdom as one of the leading popular authorities on the continent in the era of independence. His book Lost Cities of Africa won the Anisfield-Wolf Award for best book in 1960. From 1969, Davidson was involved in the Anti-Apartheid Movement and eventually became the movement's vice-president. He was a strong supporter of Pan-Africanism, especially from the 1980s, and was critical of the white-minority government in Rhodesia and of the American-backed União Nacional para a Independência Total de Angola (UNITA) in Angola. He spent long periods in Angola and in Eritrea during its war of independence from Ethiopia. In 1984, Davidson produced an eight-part documentary series for Channel 4 entitled Africa.

Although not an academic, Davidson gained a reputation as an authority on African affairs and received a number of honorary positions at universities, including the School of Oriental and African Studies. Davidson also gained honorary degrees from universities in Europe and Africa, as well as a number of civic decorations. In 1976, he won the Medalha Amílcar Cabral. He received honorary degrees from the Open University of Great Britain in 1980, and the University of Edinburgh in 1981. Davidson's Africa series won the Gold Award from the International Film and Television Festival of New York in 1984. In 2002 he was decorated by the Portuguese president Jorge Sampaio as Grande Oficial da Ordem do Infante D. Henrique.

== Selected books ==
- Partisan Picture. Bedford: Bedford Books, 1946
- Highway Forty: An incident. London: Frederick Muller, 1949.
- Report on Spain. London: Union of Democratic Control, 1951
- Report on Southern Africa. London: Cape, 1952
- Golden Horn (novel). London: Cape, 1952
- African Awakening. London: Cape, 1955
- What Really Happened in Hungary? London: Union of Democratic Control, 1956
- Lost Cities of Africa. Little, Brown and Company, 1959
- Old Africa Rediscovered. London: Gollancz, 1959
- Black Mother: The Years of the African Slave Trade. Boston: Little Brown, 1961
  - African Slave Trade: Precolonial History 1450–1850. Boston: Atlantic-Little, Brown, 1961
- The African Past: Chronicles from Antiquity to Modern Times. London: Longman, 1964
- Africa: History of a Continent. London: Weidenfeld & Nicolson, 1966
- African Kingdoms. Time-Life International (Nederland) N V, 1966
  - Africa in History. London: Weidenfeld and Nicolson, 1968. ISBN 0297764055
- The Africans: An Entry to Cultural History. Boston, Mass: Little, Brown, 1969
  - The African Genius. Boston, Mass: Little, Brown, 1969. ISBN 085255799X
- The Africans, Prentice Hall, 1969
- The Liberation of Guine, Penguin, 1969
- Black Star: A View of the Life and Times of Kwame Nkrumah, 1973. New York: Praeger, 1974
- In the Eye of the Storm: Angola's People. Garden City, N.Y.: Doubleday, 1972. 1974
- A History of West Africa 1000–1800. London: Longman, 1977
- Let Freedom Come: Africa in Modern History. Boston: Little, Brown, 1978
- Scenes From The Anti-Nazi War. Monthly Review Press, 1980
- Special Operations Europe: Scenes from the anti-Nazi war. London: Gollancz, 1980. ISBN 0575028203
- No Fist Is Big Enough to Hide the Sky: The Liberation of Guinea-Bissau and Cape Verde, 1963–74, 1981
- The Black Man's Burden: Africa and the Curse of the Nation-State. New York: Times Books, 1992
- African Civilization Revisited: From Antiquity to Modern Times. Trenton, N.J.: Africa World Press, 1991. 1995
- West Africa Before the Colonial Era. London: Longman, 1998
