= William Deakin =

British historian, veteran, literary assistant, and warden

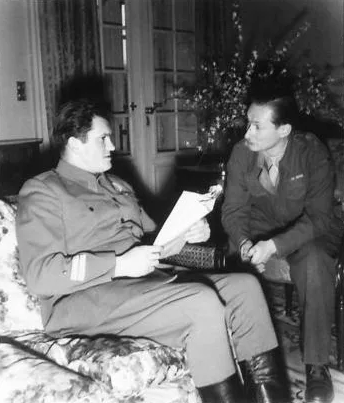
Vladimir Dedijer and William Deakin in 1945

Sir Frederick William Dampier Deakin DSO (3 July 1913 – 22 January 2005) also known as F. W. Deakin, was a British historian, World War II veteran, literary assistant to Winston Churchill and the first warden of St Antony's College, Oxford.

== Life ==
Deakin was educated at Westminster School, then at Christ Church, Oxford, where he began to develop a reputation as one of the most brilliant and dashing figures of his generation.

=== Second World War ===
In 1941 he was seconded to Special Operations, War Office, in 1941. On 28 May 1943 he parachuted into highlands of Montenegro as representative of the British GHQ in the Middle East to the central command of the Yugoslav Partisans, who were led by Josip Broz Tito. Deakin's mission, codenamed Typical, joined Tito as the Partisans were being hunted through the gorges of the Tara River between the triple chains of mountain massifs of Mount Durmitor and Ljubišnja and canyons ravines of the region by German and Italian forces during Operation Schwarz. Just below the summit of Mount Ozren, the Partisans were trapped by German aerial bombardment and forced to take cover among birch groves. In one attack, a cluster of bombs fell among them, killing Deakin's radio operator, Bill Stuart, Tito's Alsatian dog 'Luks', and wounding both Tito and Deakin.

The Operation Typical group were disbanded at the end of September 1943 and absorbed into the mission of Sir Fitzroy Maclean (aka Macmis). Before the Second Session of AVNOJ, in Jajce (1943) the (by parachutes) and hung the English mission, William Deakin stayed with the Partisans in Petrovo Polje, today's municipality of Kneževo. This field is located on a plateau between Vrbanja river and Ilomska. Deakin's impressive reporting on the situation from on the ground is considered to have had a decisive impact on British policy towards the support of resistance movements in Yugoslavia (although the significant role of intelligence decrypts was not revealed until the 1970s, see Yugoslavia and the Allies).

He was assigned the role of Literary Assistant to Sir Winston Churchill during the years 1936–40, and the period 1945–55. He was described by Churchill's biographer, Sir Martin Gilbert, as being "at the centre of the web of all Churchill's literary efforts."

=== Literary and academic career ===
Subsequently, Deakin completed several historical works, drawing upon his experiences during both the Second World War and his time with Churchill. His publications include numerous articles on Yugoslavia, as well as The Brutal Friendship, published in 1962. The latter was a detailed examination of German-Italian relations during World War II, and revealed Deakin not only as a formidable historian of diplomacy, but also, in his assessment of the death of Italian fascism, a notable political analyst. He was later editor, with his friend Alan Bullock, of two series of historical texts, The British Political Tradition and The Oxford History of Modern Europe.

In 1950, he was appointed as the first Warden (or principal) of the new St Antony's College, Oxford. He remained in this role until 1968, when he was succeeded by another historian, Raymond Carr, who had been appointed as his Sub-Warden in 1966.

In 1963 Deakin returned to Montenegro to perform research for his wartime memoir of fighting with Tito's army. His memoir was published as The Embattled Mountain, the title referring to Mount Durmitor, the environs of which Deakin and Tito's army had been pursued over by German and Italian forces; see Battle of the Sutjeska.

=== Honours ===
- Hon. Fellow of the British Academy, 1980
- Knight Bachelor, 1975
- Russian Order of Valour, 1944
- Chevalier de la Légion d’Honneur, 1953
- Grosse Verdienstkreuz, 1958
- Yugoslav Partisan Star (1st Class), 1969

== Marriages ==
He married his first wife, Margaret Ogilvy, in 1935; they had two sons, who survive him, but the marriage ended in 1940. He remarried, in 1943, to Livia Stela. They remained married until her death in 2001.

== See also ==
- Sir Fitzroy Maclean
- Special Operations Executive
- Operation Typical
- Winston Churchill
- Josip Broz
- Partisans (Yugoslavia)
- Yugoslavia and the Allies
- Atomic bomb

== Bibliography ==
- Deakin, F.W.D. (1962). The Brutal Friendship: Mussolini, Hitler and the fall of Italian fascism. Weidenfeld and Nicolson, London & Harper and Rowe, New York.
- Deakin, F.W.D. (1966). The Case of Richard Sorge. Chatto & Windus, London. (with G.R. Storry)
- Deakin, F.W.D. (1971). The Embattled Mountain. Oxford University Press, London. ISBN 0-19-215175-4.
