= Countess of Eldon =

Countess of Eldon is a title given to the wife of the Earl of Eldon. The title has been held by several women, including:

- Elizabeth Scott, Countess of Eldon (c.1750-1831)
- Louisa Scott, Countess of Eldon (1807-1852)
