= Lady Maclean's Cook Book =

British cook book

- Front cover of the 1975 edition
- Author: Veronica Maclean
- Language: English
- Genre: Cuisine
- Publisher: Collins
- Publication date: 1965 (61 years ago)
- Publication place: United Kingdom
- Media type: Hardback book
- Pages: 234
- ISBN: 0002114534

Lady Maclean's Cook Book is a book by Scottish food writer and hotelier Veronica Maclean, who was officially titled The Honourable Lady Maclean.

The book was published by Collins Clear-Type Press, in 1965, with revisions made in 1966. It was reprinted in 1967, 1968, 1970, 1973, 1975 and (in paperback) 1985.

Maclean dedicated the books to Mrs Cockerill, who taught her how to cook, but who, Maclean says, "fortunately knows she will always do it better herself".

The book is compiled from handwritten or typewritten recipes from Maclean's family and friends on their own stationery, some including the sender's letterhead, as well as her own recipes, many of which came from her travels around the world in the wake of her husband, diplomat Fitzroy Maclean.

The section headings were the work of Avril Veronica Gibb, a prominent artist.

== Background ==
In the book's introduction, written by Maclean at Creggan's Inn in Strachur, Argyll and Bute, in July 1966, Maclean explains that her husband's great-great-grandmother, Lady Margaret Maclean of Ardgour, kept a large quarto book, in which she wrote her favourite recipes, alongside the names of the friends who had given them to her. Beginning in the early 1960s, Maclean decided to do the same.

She notes that some of the recipes are very complicated or extravagant when considered for everyday use, and they should be used for special occasions. Her desire was to represent family (or country-house) cooking at its best, as opposed to classical, restaurant or grand London food.

== Chapters ==
The books is divided into the following chapters:

- Soups
- Hot first course or supper dishes
- Cold first course or supper dishes
- Hors d'oeuvres
- Fish
- Meat
- Puddings – cold
- Puddings – hot
- Scones and cakes
- Savouries
- Odds and ends

Recipes include the Duchess of Devonshire's fish soup, Lady Diana Cooper's blackcurrant leaf ice, Lady Lovat's oxtail, and Fitz's "plov from Samarkand".

A section is also dedicated to English and American equivalent measures.
