= Strachur House =

House in Argyll and Bute, Scotland

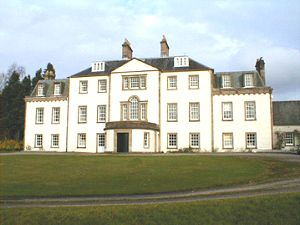
- Strachur House
- Interactive map of the Strachur House area

General information
- Location: Strachur, Scotland
- Coordinates: 56.1691°N 5.0765°W
- Construction started: c. 1770

Technical details
- Floor count: 3

Strachur House is a Category B listed building in Strachur, Argyll and Bute, Scotland. It dates from around 1770, and is a three-storey building, built mostly of coursed rubble.

The building's wings were added around 1815.

== History ==
The house was built for General John Campbell, 17th of Strachur. He was succeeded by his sister, Janet, wife of Colin Campbell of Ederline.

Lord George Granville Campbell (son of George Campbell, 8th Duke of Argyll; 25 December 1850 – 21 April 1915) and Lady Sybil Lascelles Alexander (d. 1 May 1947) were subsequent owners of the house.

Joan Campbell (5 August 1887 – 18 July 1960) lived here in the early 20th century. Ian Anstruther was sent to stay with his mother's sister during his parents' divorce.

Between 1957 and 2005, it was the home of Lady Veronica Maclean, who moved there with her husband, Sir Fitzroy Maclean, 1st Baronet. He died in 1996, aged 85. It is now the home of their son, Charles Maclean. Charles also inherited the Creggans Inn, located half a mile to the northwest from Strachur House, from his parents, who purchased both it and the house in 1957. He sold it in 2008.

== See also ==
- Campbell of Strachur
- List of listed buildings in Argyll and Bute
