= General Phipps =

General Phipps may refer to:

- Edmund Phipps (British Army officer) (1760–1837), British Army general
- Jeremy Phipps (1942–2021), British Army major general
- Henry Phipps, 1st Earl of Mulgrave (1755–1831), British Army general
- Edmund Phipps-Hornby (1857–1947), British Army brigadier general
