= Avril Gibb =

British artist and calligrapher

- Gibb pictured around 1985
- Born: Avril Veronica Gibb; 16 April 1926; Glasgow, Scotland
- Died: 6 February 2016 (aged 89); Largs, Scotland
- Occupation(s): Artist, calligrapher
- Spouse: Sir James Watson-Stewart (1980–1988; his death)

Avril Veronica Gibb (16 April 1926 – 6 February 2016), officially known as Lady Avril Veronica Watson-Stewart, was a Scottish artist and calligrapher. She specialised in medieval manuscripts.

== Early life ==
Gibb was born in Glasgow, in 1926, as an only child. Her father, Andrew Adamson Gibb, owned a pianoforte business in Cambridge Street. The family later lived in Skelmorlie.

She attended Glasgow High School for Girls, where she gained an interest in art.

Aged 21, Gibb began four years of studying at the Glasgow School of Art.

In the 1960s, she spent a period living and working in New York City, before returning to the family's Beach House in Skelmorlie to care for her parents, who were in failing health. During this period, Gibb founded a bird sanctuary at the house, and she adopted an owl. She used an owl in the logo for Hessilhead Wildlife Rescue Centre in Beith.

== Career ==
Upon graduating college in 1951, she worked with Glasgow architect Jack Coia. She created five illuminated addresses which were presented to Elizabeth II during her state visit to Scotland in 1953. One of them is now archived at Windsor Castle.

Gibb also designed and lettered many architectural features in buildings and memorials which were being built or renovated in Glasgow during the 1960s and 1970s.

She etched the glass screen present on the McTaggart Memorial Chapel in Largs Parish Church, as well as designing a plaque at Wemyss Bay railway station.

In 1965, she provided the illustrated section headings for Veronica Maclean's Lady Maclean's Cook Book.

== Personal life ==
Gibb married Sir James Watson-Stewart, 4th Baronet of Balgownie, in September 1980, the ceremony taking place at Largs Episcopal Church. She was Watson-Stewart's second wife, after Anne Elizabeth Glaister. The couple lived at Kilcreggan, Argyll and Bute. She became a widow eight years later, and returned to Wemyss Bay, living in a second-floor flat at Undercliff Court.

Around 2006, after a fall, Gibb moved Largs. Her health continued to deteriorate, however, and she moved into Moorburn Manor Nursing Home.

She was a patron of Largs Variations choir.

== Death and legacy ==
Having developed dementia in her final years, Gibb died in 2016, aged 89. A memorial service was held at St Columba's Scottish Episcopal Church in Largs on 24 February.

The Glasgow School of Art established the Avril V. Gibb Memorial Prize in her memory.
