= Carlen =

Carlen may refer to

- Carlen (surname)
- Carlen House, a historic house museum in Alabama, United States
- Carlen v Drury (1812), a UK partnership law case
