= Elizabeth Scott, Countess of Eldon =

Elizabeth Scott, Countess of Eldon (c.1754 – 28 June 1831), formerly Elizabeth Surtees, was the wife of John Scott, 1st Earl of Eldon.

== Biography ==
She was the daughter of Aubone Surtees, a banker of Newcastle upon Tyne, and his wife, formerly Elizabeth Stephenson, and was baptised at St Nicholas, Newcastle upon Tyne, on 26 November 1754. She married John Scott in Blackshiels, Scotland, on 19 November 1772. The marriage was officially blessed two months later on 19 January 1773 at St Nicholas, Newcastle upon Tyne. The couple had eloped when the earl, who was from a relatively poor Newcastle family, was training to be a clergyman. His occupation as a curate was inadequate to keep a wife and he trained instead as a lawyer. His success both in law and business was such that by the 1790s he was wealthy enough to buy the Eldon estate near Sedgefield, but the couple did not live there.

The couple had four children:

- Hon. John Scott, MP (8 March 1774 - 24 December 1805), who married Henrietta Elizabeth Ridley and had one child, John (10 December 1805 – 18 September 1854), who succeeded his grandfather as Earl of Eldon.
- Lady Elizabeth Scott (1 November 1783 or 1784 - 16 April 1862), who married George Stanley Repton, son of the landscape gardener Humphry Repton, on 27 November 1817, and had children
- Hon. William Henry John Scott, MP (c. 1794 - 1832)
- Lady Frances Jane Scott (15 June 1798 - 6 August 1838), who married the Reverend Edward Bankes (1794 - 24 May 1867) (son of Henry Bankes). They had three sons. One of their grandsons was Sir John Eldon Bankes.

== See also ==
- Bessie Surtees House
