= Peter Laird McKinlay =

Scottish medical statistician

Dr Peter Laird McKinlay FRSE FSS (1901 – 8 December 1972) was a Scottish medical statistician. His report on the effects of milk on schoolchildren brought about the introduction of Free School Milk in British Schools from the Education Act 1944.

== Life ==
He was born at Radnor Park in Dunbartonshire on 11 June 1901. He was educated at Clydebank High School. He studied medicine at Glasgow University graduating MB ChB in 1923. He received a Diploma in Public Health in 1925 and his doctorate (MD) in 1927. He then began work as a medical statistician for the Department of Health.

In 1936 he was elected a Fellow of the Royal Society of Edinburgh. His proposers were Anderson Gray McKendrick, William Ogilvy Kermack, Edward B. Ross and William Frederick Harvey. From 1930 to 1960 he was Superintendent of Statistics at General Register House, succeeding James Craufurd Dunlop.

In the Second World War he served with the Royal Army Medical Corps.

He died at Strachur in western Scotland on 8 December 1972.

== Publications ==
See In 1929 he contributed to the World Health Organization’s report on Infant Mortality

- Milk Consumption and the Growth of School Children (1930)
- Maternal Morbidity and Mortality in Scotland (1935)
