= Magdalen Eldon =

British children's author and illustrator

Magdalen Mary Charlotte Scott, Countess of Eldon OBE (née Fraser; 1 August 1913 – 27 September 1969), better known as Magdalen Eldon, was a British children's author and illustrator.

== Life ==
Magdalen Eldon was the eldest daughter of Simon Fraser, 14th Lord Lovat, and Laura (daughter of Thomas Lister, 4th Baron Ribblesdale). She married John Scott, 4th Earl of Eldon on 10 April 1934. They had two sons, the elder of whom, John, succeeded in due course to the earldom, and two adopted daughters. In 1953 she was appointed an Officer of the Order of the British Empire for her work as the Deputy President of the Devon Branch of the British Red Cross. According to Hugo Vickers:

Magdalen Eldon had a host of admirers: 'Bobbety Salisbury and King George VI adored her'. Duncan Grant wanted to paint her, the producer Max Reinhardt wanted her to take over from Lady Diana Cooper in The Miracle, but … she was 'diffident and genuinely modest about her appearance'… Lady Eldon had wished to be a nun when young. Instead she married, had two sons and later adopted two little girls. Always deeply religious, she ran retreats, illustrated religious books for children, worked for the Red Cross with a zeal that matched Edwina Mountbatten's, and was a prison visitor.

== Works ==
- The Childhood of Jesus (with Frances Phipps) (London, Collins, 1948)
- Bumble (London, Collins, 1950)
- Snow Bumble (London, Collins, 1951)
- Highland Bumble (London, Collins, 1952)
- Tobias (London, Collins, 1954)
- Tobias Two (London, Collins, 1954)
- Am I alone? A Christian's approach to the problem of loneliness (National Council of Social Service, 1960)

Eldon's most celebrated works were probably her three children's books, which she herself illustrated, about Bumble, a half-Chinese and half-Scottish Pekingese living in Devon.
