= Gee v Pritchard =

Ann Paxton Gee v William Pritchard and William Anderson (1818) 36 ER 670 is a landmark judgment of the British Court of Chancery. The case related to what matters the court could consider, court consistency and the definition of property.

== Background ==
William Gee had been the lord of Beddington Park in Surrey. William Pritchard was his son and Mrs Ann Gee was Pritchard’s step-mother.

Mrs Gee had been on good terms with her step-son (who was also Reverend Pritchard) for numerous years and had corresponded. She wrote him letters about what she thought of his life and gave him guidance. However, they ceased to be on good terms and Pritchard sought to publish the letters.

Pritchard sent the original letters back to Mrs Gee with a letter saying that he was returning the correspondence, but he had secretly made a copy of the originals. However, in a letter dated 14 May 1818, Mrs Gee was notified that Pritchard intended to publish the letters.

- Pritchard was rector at Walton on the Hill close to Beddington Park, and many parishioners were also tenants of Mrs Gee. His claim was that he sought to publish not for monetary reasons but that the various actions bought him into disrepute with the parishioners, and he needed to clear his name.
- Pritchard claimed that the letters were his sole property, and he was entitled to make such use of them as he might think proper.
- Mrs Gee sought an injunction to restrain publication of the letters as she felt the material would "wound her feelings and could have no other effect". The judgment does not give details of the letters beyond stating that they contained details of the Plaintiff’s marriage, but since the Pritchard's birth was the product of an extramarital affair and his father, Mr Gee, had been the local lord of the manor, it is probable that it would have caused considerable harm to the plaintiff it if it had been made public.

== Decision ==
The Court held the case could proceed on the fact of property but not on the idea of feelings or wounded feelings or a violation of a trust or pledge, rather an injury to a property.

Eldon LC held that "the Plaintiff (Mrs. Gee) had sufficient property in the original letters to authorise an injunction, unless she has by some act deprived herself of it". He quoted Lord Chancellor Hardwicke in Pope v Curl "for at most the receiver has only a joint property with the writer".

He repudiated an argument that the publication of letters would be restrained because their publication would be painful to the feelings of the plaintiff. He said, "The question will be, whether the bill has stated facts of which the Court can take notice, as a case of civil property, which it is bound to protect".

== Authorities ==
The judgment cited:

- Pope v Curl 2 Atk 342
- Thompson v Stanhope Amb 737
- Lady Percaval v Phipps 2 Ves & Bw
- Southey v Sherwood 2 Mer 435
- Earl of Granard v Dunkin 1 Bull and Beat 207
- Forester v Waller (1741) 4 Burr 2331

The decision has subsequently been Cited in:

- Prince Albert v Strange (1849)
