= Creggans Inn =

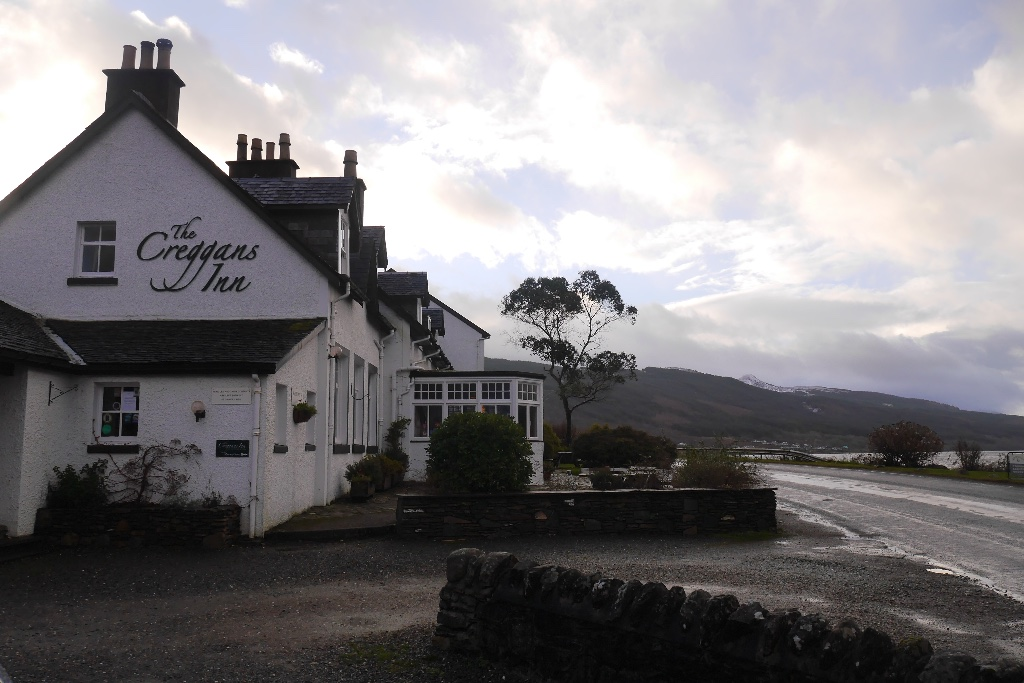
- Interactive map of the Creggans Inn area

General information
- Type: Inn and restaurant
- Location: Strachur, Scotland
- Coordinates: 56°10′32″N 5°04′59″W
- Completed: 1879 (147 years ago)

Website
- https://www.creggans-inn.co.uk

The Creggans Inn is an inn and restaurant overlooking the eastern shores of Loch Fyne in Strachur, Argyll and Bute, Scotland.

== History ==
Established by the Campbells of Strachur in 1879, the inn was built to take advantage of passengers travelling between Strachur and Inverary, on the western side of the loch, via paddle steamer. In 1898, Roger Plowden purchased the building from the Campbells. He owned the inn for twenty years, and sold it in 1918 to Lady George and Miss Joan Campbell. In 1957, the inn (and the surrounding Strachur Estate) was purchased by Sir Fitzroy Maclean, 1st Baronet, and his wife, Lady Veronica Maclean. They enlarged the building. Between 2002 and 2007, the inn was owned by the Robertson family. In 2007, Archie and Gill Maclellan became the new owners of the inn. They put it on the market in 2026 for £850,000.

The bar of the inn, which has fourteen rooms, is named MacPhunn's.
