= John Scott, 4th Earl of Eldon =

British Royal Auxiliary Air Force officer, peer and courtier

Flight lieutenant The Right Honourable The Earl of Eldon GCVO DL JP
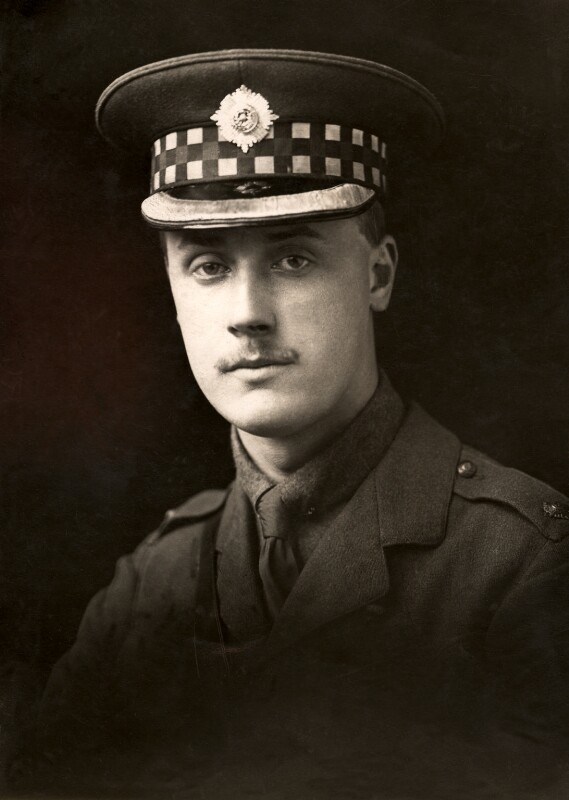
- Hon. John Scott, 1918

Personal details
- Born: John Scott; 29 March 1899
- Died: 20 October 1976 (aged 77)
- Spouse: Hon. Magdalen Mary Charlotte Fraser (after 1934)
- Children: 3, including John
- Parent(s): John Scott, Viscount Encombe; Hon. Mary Laura Fraser
- Education: Ampleforth College
- Alma mater: Magdalen College, Oxford
- Awards: Légion d'honneur

Military service
- Branch/service: Scots Greys; Royal Auxiliary Air Force
- Rank: Flight lieutenant
- Battles/wars: World War I World War II

John Scott, 4th Earl of Eldon GCVO DL JP (29 March 1899 – 20 October 1976) was a British Royal Auxiliary Air Force officer, peer and courtier.

== Early life ==
Eldon was the son of John Scott, Viscount Encombe (1870–1900), and Hon. Mary Laura Fraser (1869–1946). His younger brother, the Hon. Michael Simon Scott (1900–1938), married American heiress Ruth Brady (the second daughter of James Cox Brady and a descendant of Anthony N. Brady), died while fishing off the coast of Palm Beach, Florida.

His father was the eldest son, and heir apparent, of John Scott, 3rd Earl of Eldon and Henrietta Scott, Countess of Eldon (a granddaughter of Godfrey Macdonald, 3rd Baron Macdonald). Among his large family was aunt Lady Margaret Scott, a golfer who won the first three British Ladies Championships and uncles Michael Scott, who won the British Amateur Golf Championship in 1933, Osmund Scott, the runner-up at the 1905 Amateur Championship, and Denys Scott, also a competitive golfer. His maternal grandparents were Simon Fraser, 13th Lord Lovat and Alice Mary Blundell, daughter of Thomas Weld-Blundell.

He was educated at Ampleforth College and Magdalen College, Oxford.

== Career ==
He served in the First World War as a junior officer in the Scots Greys. On 10 August 1926 he succeeded his eccentric grandfather as Earl of Eldon, his father having already died in 1900.

During the Second World War, he served as an officer in the Royal Auxiliary Air Force as part of No. 930 (Hampshire) Squadron. He was promoted to flight lieutenant on 16 December 1941. On 8 June 1954 he resigned his commission, retaining his rank.

Between 1937 and 1952, Lord Eldon held the office of Lord-in-Waiting to George VI and held the office of Justice of the Peace for Hampshire in 1938. He was appointed Knight Commander of the Royal Victorian Order in 1952. He served as a Lord-in-Waiting to Elizabeth II between 1952 and 1968, participating in that role in her coronation in 1953, and was a Deputy Lieutenant of Devon from 1957 to 1966. He was appointed a Grand officier of the Légion d'honneur in 1960. In the 1963 New Year Honours he was made a Knight Grand Cross of the Royal Victorian Order.

== Personal life ==
On 10 April 1934, Lord Eldon was married to his cousin, the Hon. Magdalen Mary Charlotte Fraser, daughter of Simon Fraser, 14th Lord Lovat and the former Hon. Laura Lister (the second daughter of Thomas Lister, 4th Baron Ribblesdale). Together, they were the parents of three sons, only two of whom lived to maturity:

- John Joseph Nicholas Scott, 5th Earl of Eldon (1937–2017), who married Countess Claudine Maria Olga Columba Fidelis von Montjoye-Vaufrey et de la Roche, youngest daughter of Count Franz von Montjoye-Vaufrey et de la Roche of Vienna, in 1961.
- Hon. Simon Peter Scott (1939–2009), a Page of Honour to Queen Elizabeth II from 1953 to 1956 who married Isabel Dalzell de Bertodano, second daughter of Andrew Ramon Dalzell de Bertodano (eldest son of 8th Marquis del Moral) and the former Lady Sylvia Savile (third daughter of John Savile, 6th Earl of Mexborough), in 1966.

Lord Eldon died on 20 October 1976 and was succeeded in his title by his eldest son, also called John.

Peerage of the United Kingdom
| Preceded by John Scott | Earl of Eldon; 1926–1976 | Succeeded by John Scott |
