= Strachur Bay =

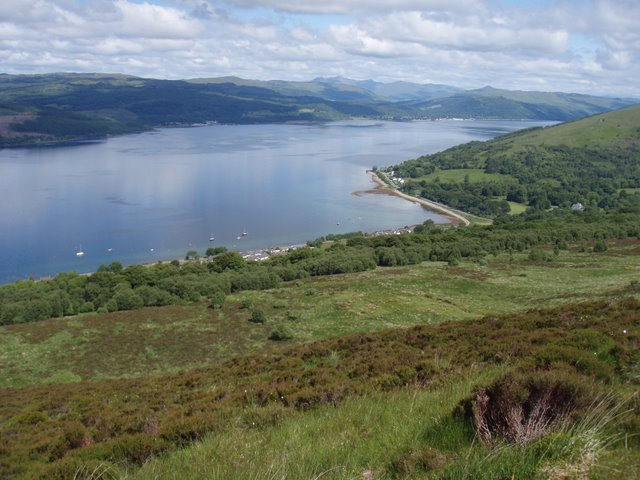
- Looking down the slopes of Meall Reamhar towards Strachur Bay

- Location within Argyll and Bute
- Location: Strachur
- Coordinates: 56.1674°N 5.08479452°W
- Type: sea loch bay
- River sources: Eas Dubh
- Settlements: Dunkeld

Strachur Bay is a coastal embayment, on a 114° orientation, on the eastern coast of the longest sea loch in Scotland, Loch Fyne located in Argyll and Bute, on the west coast of Scotland. Strachur Bay provides good anchorage, for small vessels, when the wind is from the northeast and southeast.

== Settlements ==
The village and parish of Strachur is located at the head of the bay. The bay is on the main tourist route of the Cowal peninsula, with the hamlet of St Catherines immediately north along the coast A815 road of Loch Fyne. The A886 road, which is a tourist route, starts from Strachur from the A815, and continues to Colintraive, where it splits and continues from Rubodach on the Isle of Bute and continues to Port Bannatyne. The A815 road continues past the village of Strachur, passes Glenbranter, and becomes the coast road of Loch Eck, travelling south, passes Holy Loch, passing Dunoon and terminating at Toward Point to the south of Dunoon.

Strachur House, overlooks the north end of the bay. In September 1848, the dying genius Frédéric Chopin once spent a week at the invitation of Lord and Lady Muray at the house. Lady Murray had been his first London pupil.

== Geography ==
Above Strachur Bay is the 481 metre of the Cruach nan Capull, which can be directly seem to the south when viewed at some height. Behind Strachur Bay, is the hill of Meall Reamhar at 293 metres which rises and follows the south by southeast direction of the loch. Meall Reamhar is heavily forested, on what remains of the old Glenbranter Forest. Meall Reamhar rises to a shallow peak at An Càrr at 335 metres, still following the direction of the loch, reaching Sidhean Sluaigh at 436 metres, with the tallest peak of Cruach nan Capull behind it. Behind the Cruach nan Capull is a valley has been cut by the Glean Dubh, which separates Cruach nan Capull from Meall Reamharr at 433 metres, directly behind An Càrr. Directly behind Meall Reamharr and to the east is the village of Glenbranter and glen of Glenbranter, and Glenshellish, which forks off of it. To the north by northeast direction, i.e. on the other side of valley, facing away from Glen Branter are two parallel unnamed shallow hills.

== Gallery ==
Images of Strachur Bay and the surrounding area

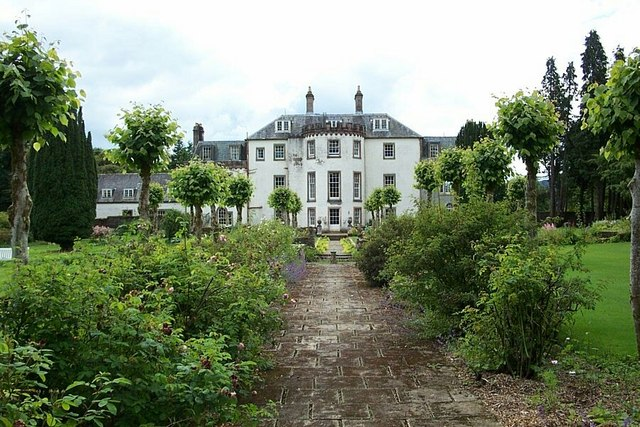
Strachur House

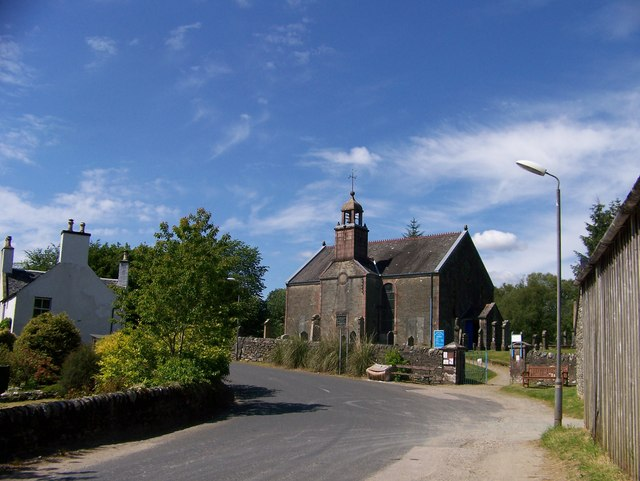
Strachur Church of Scotland The weather in this part of Scotland is always at its best at Strachur

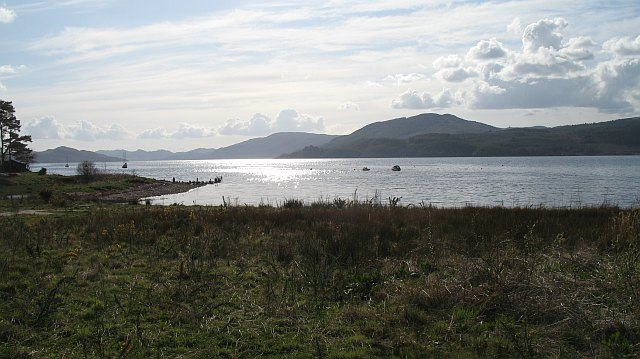
Strachur Bay Not the outflow of the Cur - that runs most of the length of Cowal, via Loch Eck to the Holy Loch, but a smaller burn. Dùn Leacainn visible across Loch Fyne.

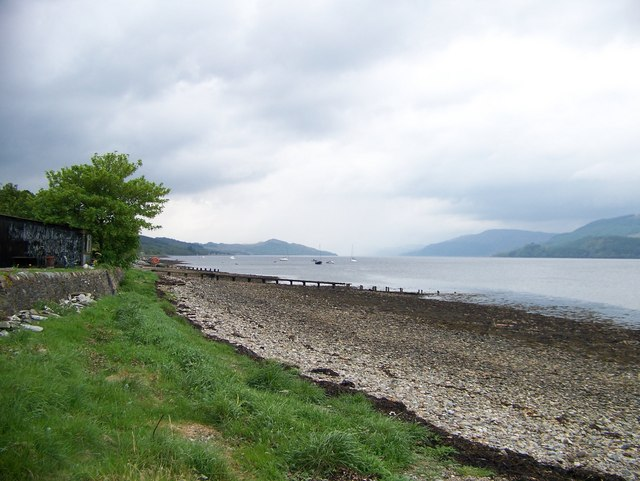
Loch Fyne from Strachur Bay

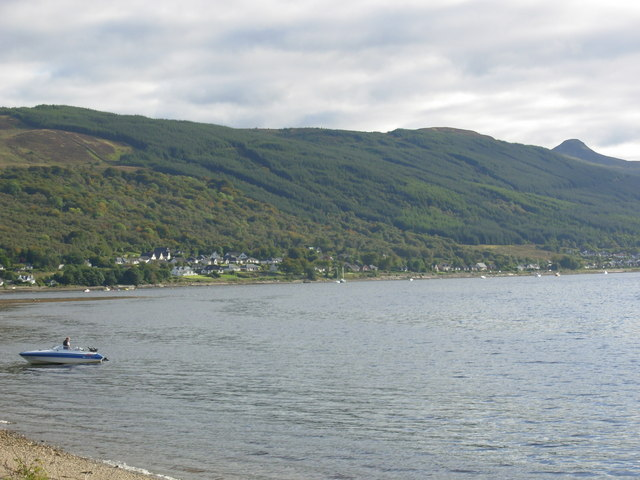
Strachur Bay on Loch Fyne
