= Jeremy Phipps =

British Army general (1942–2021)

Major General Jeremy Phipps CB
- Born: 30 June 1942
- Died: 16 March 2021 (aged 78)
- Relatives: Veronica Nell Fraser (mother); Sir Fitzroy Maclean, 1st Baronet (stepfather); Sir Eric Phipps (paternal grandfather)
- Military career
- Allegiance: United Kingdom
- Branch: British Army
- Service years: 1960–1997
- Rank: Major General
- Commands: Director Special Forces; 11th Armoured Brigade; Queen's Own Hussars
- Conflicts: Operation Banner; Gulf War
- Awards: Companion of the Order of the Bath

Major General Jeremy Julian Joseph Phipps, CB (30 June 1942 – 16 March 2021) was a British Army officer who served as Senior British Loan Services Officer in Oman from 1993 to 1997.

== Early life ==
Phipps was the son of a Royal Navy officer, Lieutenant Alan Phipps (1915–1943), who was killed ashore at the Battle of Leros. Phipps' father was one of the sons of Sir Eric Phipps, a British diplomat descended from the first Earl of Mulgrave. Phipps' mother, Veronica Nell (née Fraser; 1920–2005) was a Roman Catholic, and the daughter of Simon Fraser, 14th Lord Lovat. In 1946, she married secondly Brigadier Fitzroy Maclean, who raised Phipps, who was educated at Ampleforth and the Royal Military Academy Sandhurst.

== Military career ==
Phipps was commissioned into the Queen's Own Hussars in 1960. He was serving in the Special Air Service during the Iranian Embassy siege in 1980, and was subsequently given command of the Queen's Own Hussars. He was appointed commander of the 11th Armoured Brigade in 1986, Director Special Forces in 1989 and Senior British Loan Services Officer in Oman in 1993, before retiring in 1997.

In retirement Phipps became a Director at Control Risks Group and, from 2002, head of security at the Jockey Club. He then was hired by Aegis Defence Services.

== Death ==
Phipps died on 16 March 2021 at the age of 78. A memorial Mass was held for him on 30 September 2021 at the Brompton Oratory in London.

Military offices
Preceded by Michael Rose	Director Special Forces; 1989–1993	Succeeded by Cedric Delves
