= John Scott, 5th Earl of Eldon =

English soldier and peer (1937–2017)

The Right Honourable¨ The Earl of Eldon

Member of the House of Lords
- Lord Temporal
- In office 20 October 1976 – 11 November 1999 as a hereditary peer
- Preceded by: The 4th Earl of Eldon
- Succeeded by: Seat abolished (Note: Pursuant to the House of Lords Act 1999.)

Personal details
- Born: John Joseph Nicholas Scott; 24 April 1937
- Died: 20 January 2017 (aged 79)
- Party: Crossbench

John Joseph Nicholas Scott, 5th Earl of Eldon (24 April 1937 – 30 January 2017), was an English soldier and hereditary peer, a member of the House of Lords from 1976 to 1999. Before 1976, he was known formally as Viscount Encombe.

The son of John Scott, 4th Earl of Eldon, and his wife Magdalen Fraser, a daughter of Simon Fraser, 14th Lord Lovat, he was educated at Ampleforth College and Trinity College, Oxford, and then commissioned as a second lieutenant into the Royal Scots Greys. He later served as a lieutenant in the Army Reserve.

On 20 October 1976, he succeeded as Earl of Eldon (a peerage created in 1821) and also as Viscount Encombe (1821) and Baron Eldon (1799). He took up his seat in the House of Lords, and from 1978 sat as a Crossbench peer.

On 1 July 1961, as Lord Encome, he married Claudine de Montjoye-Vaufrey, a daughter of Count Franz de Montjoye-Vaufrey et de la Roche. They had three children:

- John Francis Scott, later 6th Earl of Eldon (born 1962)
- Lady Tatiana Maria Laura Rose Columba Fidelis Scott (born 1967)
- Lady Victoria Laura Maria Magdalene Scott (born 1968) who married sports broadcaster Mark Pougatch in 2000.

== Notes ==
Peerage of the United Kingdom
Preceded by John Scott	Earl of Eldon; 1976–2017; Member of the House of Lords (1976–1999)	Succeeded by John Scott
Preceded by John Scott	Baron Eldon; 1976–2017	Succeeded by John Scott
