= John Scott, 1st Earl of Eldon =

British barrister and politician (1751–1838)

The Right Honourable The Earl of Eldon PC FRS FSA
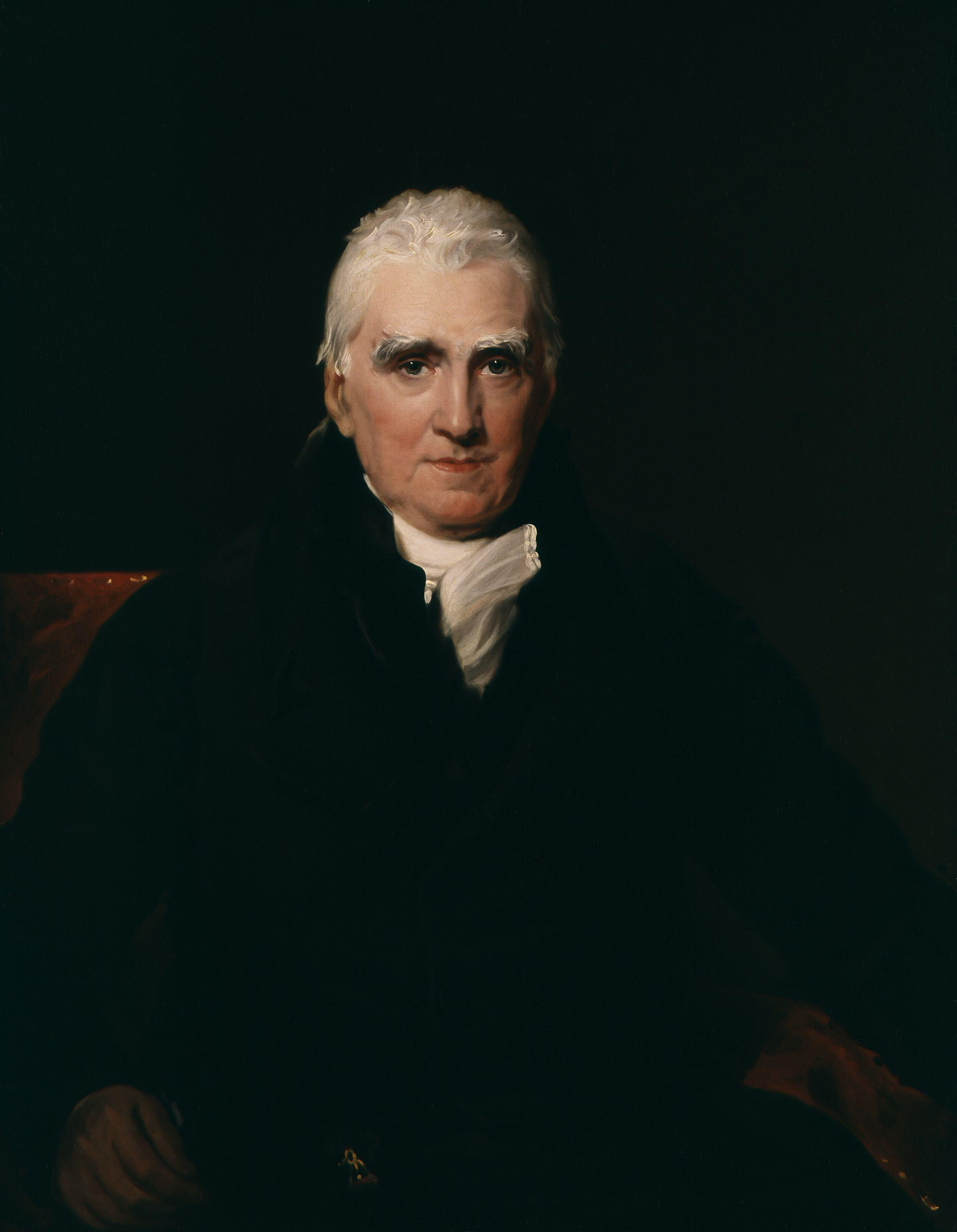
- Portrait by Sir Thomas Lawrence, c. 1826

Lord Chancellor
- In office 14 April 1801 – 7 February 1806
- Monarch: George III
- Prime Minister: Henry Addington; William Pitt the Younger
- Preceded by: The Lord Loughborough
- Succeeded by: The Lord Erskine
- In office 1 April 1807 – 12 April 1827
- Monarchs: George III; George IV
- Regent: George, Prince Regent (1811–1820)
- Prime Minister: The Duke of Portland; Spencer Perceval; The Earl of Liverpool
- Preceded by: The Lord Erskine
- Succeeded by: The Lord Lyndhurst

Personal details
- Born: 4 June 1751 Newcastle upon Tyne, England
- Died: 13 January 1838 (aged 86) London, England
- Party: Tory
- Spouse: Elizabeth Surtees (m. 1772; died 1831)
- Education: University College, Oxford

John Scott, 1st Earl of Eldon, PC, FRS, FSA (4 June 1751 – 13 January 1838) was a British barrister and politician. He served as Lord High Chancellor of Great Britain between 1801 and 1806 and again between 1807 and 1827.

== Early life ==
=== Background ===
Eldon was born in Newcastle upon Tyne. His grandfather, William Scott of Sandgate, a street adjacent to the Newcastle quayside, was clerk to a fitter, a sort of water-carrier and broker of coals. His father, whose name also was William, began life as an apprentice to a fitter, in which service he obtained the freedom of Newcastle, becoming a member of the guild of Hostmen (coal-fitters); later in life he became a principal in the business, and attained a respectable position as a merchant in Newcastle, accumulating property worth nearly £20,000.

=== Education ===
Eldon was educated at Newcastle upon Tyne Royal Grammar School. He was not remarkable at school for application to his studies, though his wonderful memory enabled him to make good progress in them; he frequently played truant and was whipped for it, robbed orchards, and indulged in other questionable schoolboy pranks; nor did he always come out of his scrapes with honour and a character for truthfulness. When he had finished his education at the grammar school, his father thought of apprenticing him to his own business, to which an elder brother Henry had already devoted himself; and it was only through the influence of his elder brother William (afterwards Lord Stowell), who had already obtained a fellowship at University College, Oxford, that it was ultimately resolved that he should continue with his studies. Accordingly, in 1766, John Scott entered University College with the view of taking holy orders and obtaining a college living. In the year following he obtained a fellowship, graduated with a Bachelor of Arts in 1770, and in 1771 won the prize for the English essay, the only university prize open in his time for general competition.

=== Elopement with Bessie Surtees ===
His wife, Elizabeth, known as "Bessie", was the eldest daughter of Aubone Surtees, a Newcastle banker. The Surtees family objected to the match, and attempted to prevent it; but a strong attachment had sprung up between them.

On 18 November 1772, Scott, with the aid of a ladder and an old friend, carried off the lady from her father's house in the Sandhill, across the border to Blackshields, in Scotland, where they were married the next day. The father of the bridegroom objected not to his son's choice, but to the time he chose to marry; it was a blight on his son's prospects, depriving him of his fellowship and his chance of church preferment. But while the bride's family refused to associate with the couple, Scott, like a prudent man and an affectionate father, set himself to make the best of a bad matter, and received them kindly, settling on his son £2000.

John returned with his wife to Oxford, and continued to hold his fellowship for what is called the year of grace given after marriage, and added to his income by acting as a private tutor. After a time, Mr Surtees was reconciled with his daughter, and made a liberal settlement of £3000.

John Scott's year of grace closed without any college living falling vacant; and with his fellowship he gave up the church and turned to the study of law. He became a student at the Middle Temple in January 1773. In 1776, he was called to the bar, intending at first to establish himself as an advocate in his native town, a scheme which his early success led him to abandon, and he soon settled to the practice of his profession in London, and on the northern circuit. In the autumn of 1776, his father died, leaving him a legacy of £1000 over and above the £2000 previously settled on him.

== Political career ==
=== At the English bar ===
In his second year at the bar his prospects began to brighten. His brother William, who by this time was the Camden professor of ancient history at Oxford, and enjoyed an extensive acquaintance with men of eminence in London, was in a position materially to advance his interests. Among his friends was the notorious Andrew Bowes of Gibside, to the patronage of whose house the rise of the Scott family was largely owing. Bowes having contested Newcastle and lost it, presented an election petition against the return of his opponent. Young Scott was retained as junior counsel in the case, and though he lost the petition he did not fail to improve the opportunity which it afforded for displaying his talents. This engagement, at the start of his second year at the bar, and the dropping in of occasional fees, must have raised his hopes; and he now abandoned the scheme of becoming a provincial barrister. A year or two of dull drudgery and few fees followed, and he began to be much depressed. But in 1780, his prospects suddenly improved by his appearance in the case of Ackroyd v Smithson, which became a leading case settling a rule of law; and the young Scott, having lost his point in the inferior court, insisted on arguing it, on appeal, against the opinion of his clients, and carried it before Lord Thurlow, whose favorable consideration he won by his able argument.

The same year Bowes again retained him in an election petition; and in the year following Scott greatly increased his reputation by his appearance as leading counsel in the Clitheroe election petition. From this time his success was certain. In 1782, he obtained a silk gown, and was so far cured of his early modesty that he declined accepting the king's counselship if precedence over him were given to his junior, Thomas Erskine, though the latter was the son of a peer and a most accomplished orator. He was now on the high way to fortune. His health, which had hitherto been but indifferent, strengthened with the demands made upon it; his talents, his power of endurance, and his ambition all expanded together. He enjoyed a considerable practice in the northern part of his circuit, before parliamentary committees and at the chancery bar. By 1787, his practice at the equity bar had so far increased that he was obliged to give up the eastern half of his circuit (which embraced six counties) and attend it only at Lancaster.

=== Member of Parliament ===
In 1782, he entered Parliament for Lord Weymouth's close borough of Weobley in Herefordshire, which Lord Thurlow obtained for him without solicitation. In Parliament he gave a general and independent support to Pitt. His first parliamentary speeches were directed against Fox's India Bill. They were unsuccessful. In one he aimed at being brilliant; and becoming merely laboured and pedantic, he was covered with ridicule by Sheridan, from whom he received a lesson which he did not fail to turn to account. In 1788, he was appointed Solicitor General, and was knighted, and at the close of this year he attracted attention by his speeches in support of Pitt's resolutions on the state of the king (George III, who then labored under a mental malady) and the delegation of his authority. It is said that he drafted the Regency Bill, which was introduced in 1789. In 1793, Sir John Scott was promoted to the office of Attorney-General, in which it fell to him to conduct the memorable prosecutions for high treason against British sympathizers with French republicanism, among others, against the celebrated Horne Tooke. These prosecutions, in most cases, were no doubt instigated by Sir John Scott, and were the most important proceedings in which he was ever professionally engaged. He has left on record, in his Anecdote Book, a defence of his conduct in regard to them.

In 1793 he was elected a Fellow of the Royal Society

== Lord High Chancellor ==
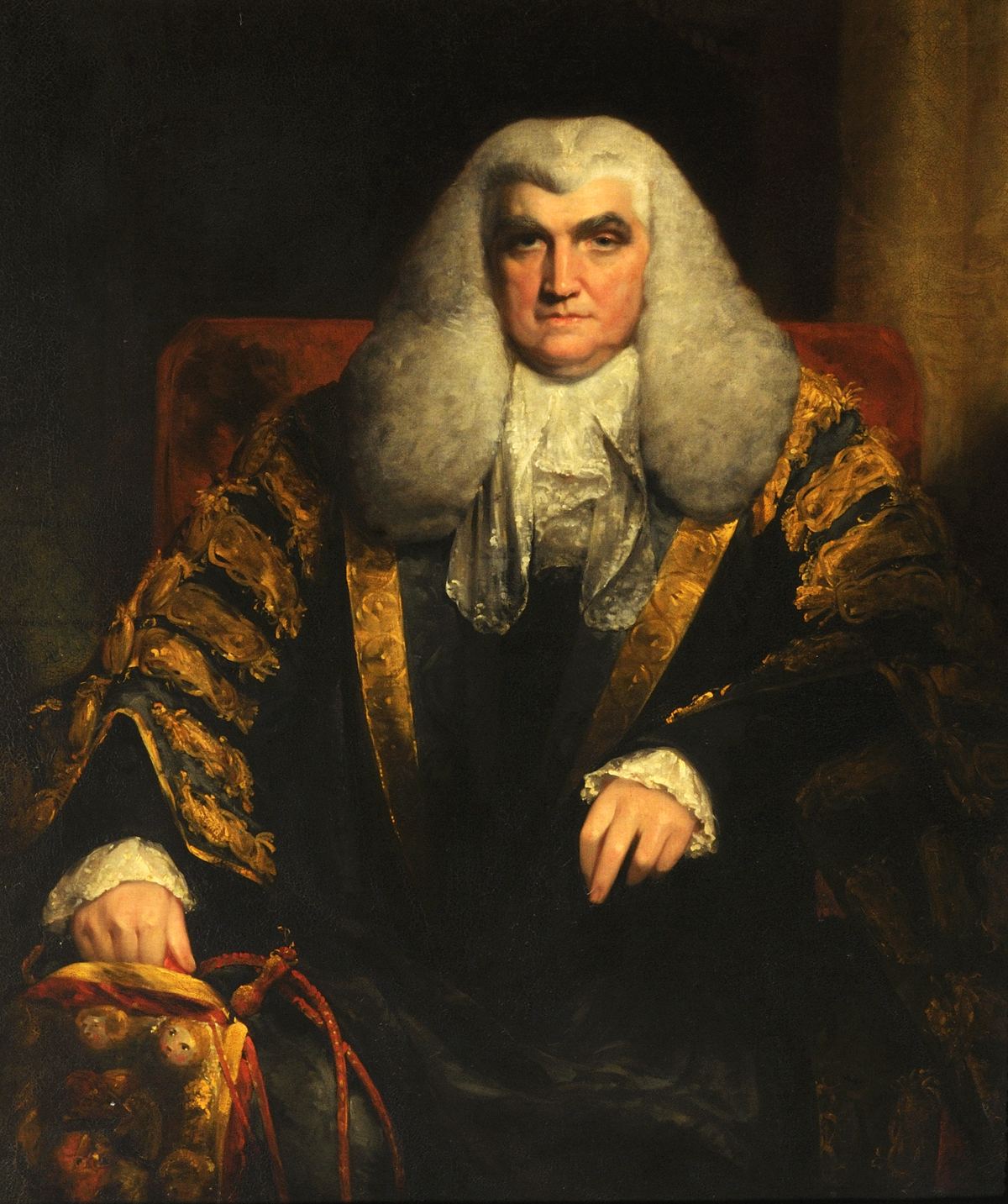
John Scott (1751–1838), afterwards 1st Earl of Eldon, Younger Brother of Lord Stowell, Fellow (1767), Lord High Chancellor of England (1801–1806) by William Cowen

In 1799, the office of chief justice of the Court of Common Pleas falling vacant, Sir John Scott's claim to it was not overlooked; and after seventeen years' service in the Lower House, he entered the House of Lords as Baron Eldon. In February 1801, the ministry of Pitt was succeeded by that of Addington, and the chief justice now ascended the woolsack. The chancellorship was given to him professedly on account of his notorious anti-Catholic zeal. From the Treaty of Amiens (1802) until 1804, Lord Eldon appears to have interfered little in politics.

In the latter year we find him conducting the negotiations which resulted in the dismissal of Addington and the recall of Pitt to office as prime minister. Lord Eldon was continued in office as chancellor under Pitt; but the new administration was of short duration, for on 23 January 1806 Pitt died, worn out with the anxieties of office, and his ministry was succeeded by a coalition, under Lord Grenville. The death of Fox, who became foreign secretary and leader of the House of Commons, soon, however, broke up the Grenville administration; and in the spring of 1807 Lord Eldon once more, under the Duke of Portland's administration, returned to the woolsack, which, from that time, he continued to occupy for about twenty years, swaying the cabinet.

During this time Lord Eldon was revered for his work in consolidating equity into a working body of legal principles. In Gee v Pritchard he wrote,

"Nothing would inflict on me greater pain in quitting this place, than the recollection that I had done anything to justify the reproach that the equity of this court varies like the Chancellor's foot."

It was not until April 1827, when the premiership, vacant through the paralysis of Lord Liverpool, fell to Canning, the chief advocate of Roman Catholic emancipation, that Lord Eldon, in the seventy-sixth year of his age, finally resigned the chancellorship in protest, being deeply opposed to the new prime minister's more liberal principles. When, after the two short administrations of Canning and Goderich, it fell to the Duke of Wellington to construct a cabinet, Lord Eldon expected to be included, if not as chancellor, at least in some important office, but he was chagrined at being overlooked at Robert Peel's insistence, in a decisive break with the High Tory past. Notwithstanding his frequent protests that he did not covet power, but longed for retirement, we find him again, so late as 1835, within three years of his death, in hopes of office under Peel. He spoke in parliament for the last time in July 1834.

In 1821, Lord Eldon had been created Viscount Encombe and Earl of Eldon by George IV, whom he managed to conciliate, partly, no doubt, by espousing his cause against his wife, whose advocate he had formerly been, and partly through his reputation for zeal against the Roman Catholics. In the same year his brother William, who from 1798 had filled the office of judge of the High Court of Admiralty, was raised to the peerage under the title of Lord Stowell.

== Personal life ==
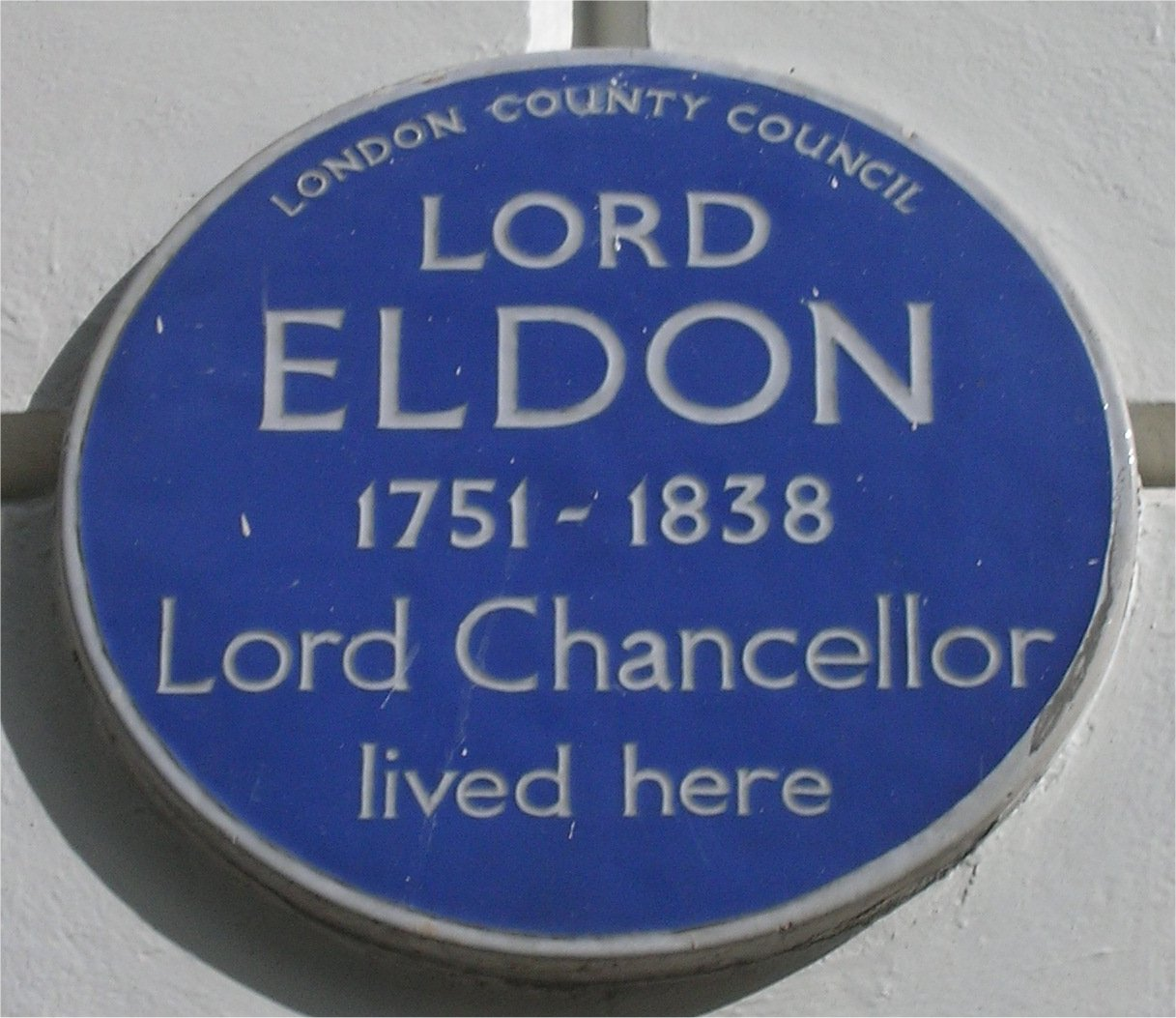
Blue plaque in Bedford Square, London

Lord Eldon's wife, the former Elizabeth Surtees, whom he called Bessie, died before him, on 28 June 1831. They had had two sons and two daughters that survived childhood:

- Hon. John Scott, MP (8 March 1774 – 24 December 1805) married Henrietta Elizabeth Ridley on 22 August 1804, daughter of Sir Matthew White Ridley, 2nd Baronet. He had one son, John (10 December 1805 – 18 September 1854), later heir to the title.
- Lady Elizabeth Scott (1 November 1783 - 16 April 1862) married George Stanley Repton, son of Humphry Repton, on 27 November 1817, and had children
- Hon. William Henry John Scott (c. 1794 - 1832) unmarried.
- Lady Frances Jane (15 June 1798 - 6 August 1838) who married Rev. Edward Bankes (1794 - 24 May 1867) (son of Henry Bankes) on 6 April 1820. They had three sons. One of their grandsons was Sir John Eldon Bankes.

Lord Eldon himself survived almost all his immediate relations. His brother William died in 1836. He himself died in London on 13 January 1838. Eldon left an estate of £2,300,000 – at a time when even estates of a million pounds were exceedingly rare. John Wade, compiler of The Black Book, or Corruption Unmasked detailed in precise figures how Eldon's "almost incredible wealth" was due to state "emoluments of which he and his family monopolize to an inordinate degree."

Eldon's title subsequently passed to his eldest grandson, John.

There is a blue plaque on his house in Bedford Square, London. He is commemorated by the naming of Old Eldon Square, in Newcastle upon Tyne, and Eldon Square in Reading.

Lord Eldon and his wife are buried in the churchyard in Kingston, Dorset.

== Legacy ==
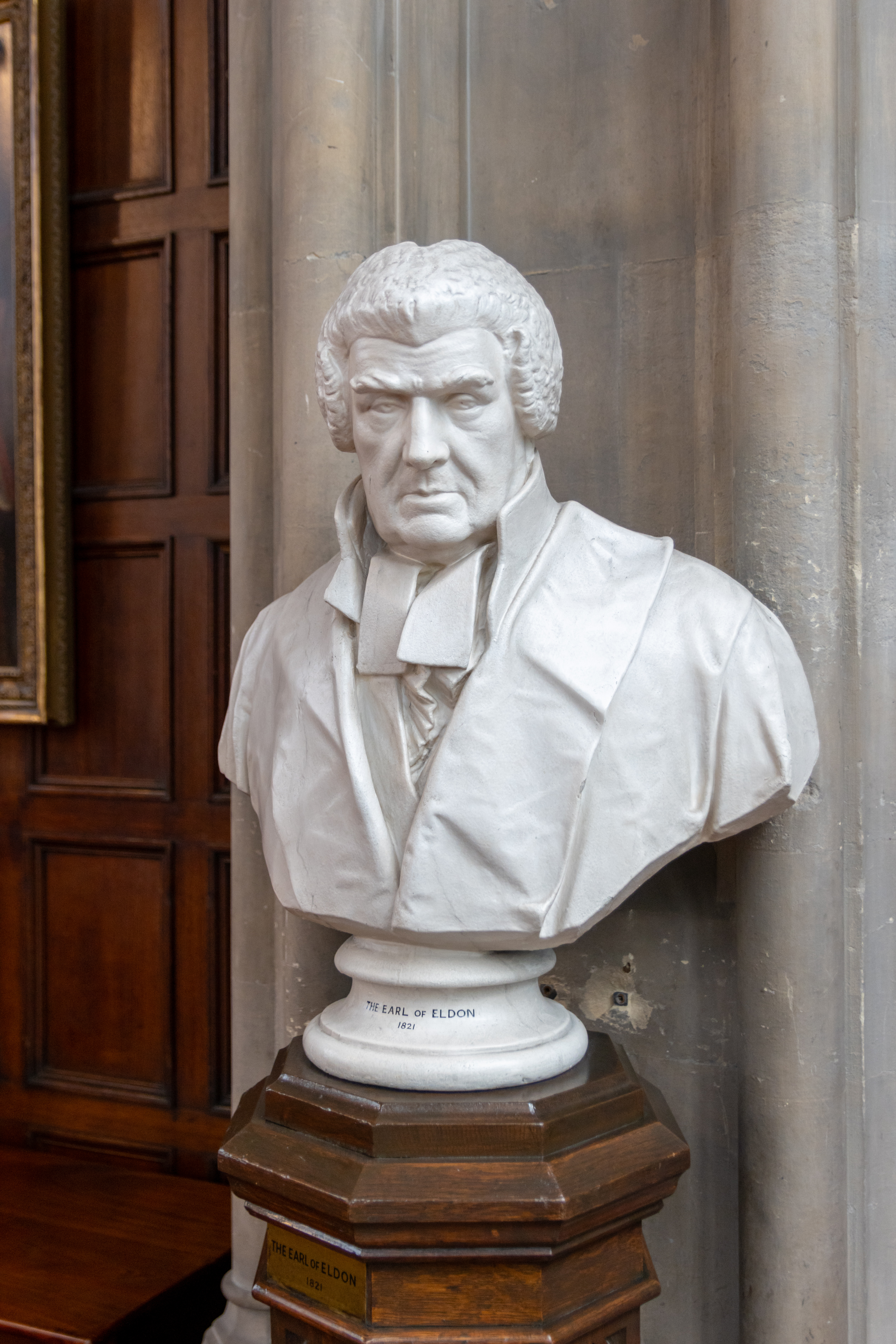
Bust of Eldon at Lincoln's Inn

=== War, peace and sorrow ===
Eldon was a loyal and tenacious supporter of the war against Napoleon; but when the prospect of a new war arose in 1823, he expressed rather different concerns: "Men delude themselves by supposing that war consists only in a proclamation, a battle, a victory and a triumph. Of the soldiers' widows and the soldiers' orphans, after the fathers and husbands have fallen in the field of battle, the survivors think not".

Shelley, however, in his Masque of Anarchy, challenged Eldon's sincerity: "Next came Fraud and he had on, Like Eldon, an ermined gown – His big tears, for he wept well – Turned to millstones as they fell".

=== Political and legal views ===
Eldon notoriously accused the political reformer Thomas Hardy of attempting to establish "representative government, the direct opposite of the government which is established here".

He himself was, however, criticised with equal force for not reforming the notoriously slow Court of Chancery, hence a cartoon of 1817 depicting him as leading a flight of lawyer-locusts descending on the law courts.

During Eldon's lifetime, journalist (George) Wingrave Cook observed: "Posterity will probably pass a severe judgement upon the memory of this statesman...there is no other instance of a man who was possessed of nearly absolute influence in the councils of the nation for a quarter of a century, and of whom it can be said that he never originated one measure that the next generation judged beneficial to his country, and never allowed one such measure to be discussed without his strenuous and generally fatal opposition."

John Wade equally noted: "there is no absurdity in law, no intolerance in church government; no arbitrary state measure, of which he is not the surly, furious, and bigoted advocate."

=== Party allegiance ===
Although labelled a Tory by the opposition and by subsequent historians, Eldon placed himself long-term in the Whig tradition, defending "a doctrine essentially similar to that which ministerial Whigs had held since the days of Burnet, Wake, Gibson and Potter". As an Ultra-Tory, protesting against Catholic Emancipation, he sat with the Whigs during the 1830 parliamentary session and in 1825, following the defeat of the Tory Sir Francis Burdett's Emancipation Bill in the House of Lords by a majority of 48, drank "the 48, the year 1688, and the glorious and immortal memory of William III". In 1831, while returning to Purbeck in an open carriage from the declaration at the Dorset county election in the company of George Bankes, he was stoned at Wareham by a mob of a hundred men. Although there were no injuries, it was stated that he might have died had not an umbrella deflected one of the stones from his head.

Nevertheless, in his unstinting opposition to the Great Reform Act as well as his belief in an unchanging Britain anchored in the values of 1688, he epitomised the reactionary values of what Palmerston called "the stupid old Tory party".

== See also ==
- Charles Dickens
- Circumlocution Office
- Charles Wetherell

== Decided cases ==
- Ackroyd v Smithson
- Evans v Bicknell (1801) 6 Ves Jun 173
- Ex parte James (1803) 8 Ves 337
- 17 Ves 320
- Higginbotham v Holme 19 Ves 88
- Lucena v Craufurd (1806) 2 Bos & PNR 269
- Carlen v Drury (1812) 1 Ves & B 154
- Gee v Pritchard (1818) 2 Swans 402
- Gordon v Gordon (1821) 3 Swan 400
- William Lawrence's suit for copyright (1822)

== Vessels named for Lord Eldon ==
Several ships were named in his honour, e.g., Earl of Eldon and Lord Eldon, and the East Indiaman Lord Eldon.

Legal offices
Preceded by Sir James Eyre	Chief Justice of the Common Pleas; 1799–1801	Succeeded by Sir Richard Arden
Unknown	Chancellor of Durham; 1787–1788	Succeeded by Sir John Mitford
Preceded by Sir Archibald Macdonald	Solicitor General; 1788–1793	Succeeded by Sir John Mitford
Preceded by Sir Archibald Macdonald	Attorney General; 1793–1799	Succeeded by Sir John Mitford
Political offices
Preceded by The Lord Loughborough	Lord High Chancellor of Great Britain; 1801–1806	Succeeded by The Lord Erskine
Preceded by The Lord Erskine	Lord High Chancellor of Great Britain; 1807–1827	Succeeded by The Lord Lyndhurst
Peerage of the United Kingdom
New creation	Earl of Eldon; 1821–1838	Succeeded by John Scott
Peerage of Great Britain
New creation	Baron Eldon; 1799–1838	Succeeded by John Scott
