= John Scott, 2nd Earl of Eldon =

British peer and Tory politician (1805–1854)

John Scott, 2nd Earl of Eldon (10 December 1805 – 18 September 1854) was a British peer and Tory politician.

== Background and education ==
Eldon was the only child of John Scott (8 March 1774 – 24 December 1805), MP for Boroughbridge, the only son of Lord Chancellor John Scott, 1st Earl of Eldon. His father died when he was only two weeks old. His mother was Henrietta Elizabeth, daughter of Sir Matthew White Ridley, 2nd Baronet. He was educated at Winchester and New College, Oxford.

== Political career ==
Eldon sat as Member of Parliament for Truro from 1828 to 1831. In 1838 he succeeded his grandfather in the earldom and entered the House of Lords.

== Family ==
Lord Eldon married Louisa, daughter of Charles Duncombe, 1st Baron Feversham, in 1831. They had one son and six daughters. She died in November 1852. Lord Eldon survived her by two years, and died in September 1854, aged 48. In 1853 he had been adjudicated a lunatic on account of "a partial dementia, exhibited in great incoherence of convocation, occasional evanescent delusions, and considerable excitement".

Parliament of the United Kingdom
Preceded by Lord FitzRoy Somerset; William Edward Tomline	Member of Parliament for Truro; 1828–1831; With: Nathaniel William Peach	Succeeded by Sir Hussey Vivian, Bt; William Tooke
Peerage of the United Kingdom
Preceded by John Scott	Earl of Eldon; 1838–1854	Succeeded by John Scott
