= Sir Fitzroy Maclean, 1st Baronet =

Scottish soldier, writer and politician

Brigadier Sir Fitzroy Maclean Bt KT CBE
- Maclean in 1970

Member of Parliament for Bute and Northern Ayrshire
- In office 8 October 1959 – 8 February 1974
- Preceded by: Charles McAndrew
- Succeeded by: John Corrie

Member of Parliament for Lancaster
- In office 15 October 1941 – 18 September 1959
- Preceded by: Herwald Ramsbotham
- Succeeded by: Humphry Berkeley

Personal details
- Born: Fitzroy Hew Royle Maclean; 11 March 1911 Cairo, Khedivate of Egypt
- Died: 15 June 1996 (aged 85) Offley, England
- Party: Conservative
- Other political affiliations: Unionist
- Spouse: Veronica Fraser-Phipps (m. 1946)
- Children: 2
- Education: Eton College
- Alma mater: King's College, Cambridge
- Occupation: Soldier; writer; politician

Military service
- Allegiance: United Kingdom
- Branch/service: British Army
- Rank: Brigadier
- Battles/wars: Second World War; Western Desert Campaign; Operation Bigamy; Allied Occupation of Iran; Operation PONGO; War in Yugoslavia; Maclean Mission; Operation Ratweek; Belgrade offensive
- Awards: Commander of the Order of the British Empire; Order of Kutuzov (Soviet Union); Croix de Guerre (France); Order of the Partisan Star (Yugoslavia)

Sir Fitzroy Hew Royle Maclean, 1st Baronet (11 March 1911 – 15 June 1996), was a British Army officer, writer and politician. Before World War II, he served as a diplomat, after which point he enlisted, and distinguished himself on several fronts. He was a Unionist Member of Parliament (MP) from 1941 to 1974.

Maclean wrote several books, including his memoirs Eastern Approaches, in which he recounted three extraordinary series of adventures: travelling, often incognito, in Soviet Central Asia; fighting in the Western Desert campaign, where he specialised in commando raids behind enemy lines; and living rough with Josip Broz Tito and his Yugoslav Partisans while commanding the Maclean Mission there. It has been widely speculated that Ian Fleming used Maclean as one of his inspirations for James Bond.

== Early life ==
Maclean was born in Cairo, Egypt, to Major Charles Wilberforce Maclean OBE DSO (1875–1953), a member of the Scottish minor nobility serving in Egypt with the Queen's Own Cameron Highlanders, and Frances Elaine Gladys Royle (1882–1954), the only daughter of George Royle, a Royal Navy officer, and Fannie Jane Longueville Snow, who wed on 12 July 1905 at St George's Church, Hanover Square, London.

== Background and education ==
Maclean was descended from the Macleans of Ardgour, a sept of the Clan Maclean, whose chiefs have as their historic seat Duart Castle on the Isle of Mull in the Inner Hebrides.

Brought up in Italy, Maclean was educated at Eton before going up to King's College, Cambridge, where he read Classics and History. He then studied in Germany before joining HM Diplomatic Service in 1933.

== In the Soviet Union ==
In 1934 Fitzroy Maclean was posted to the British Embassy in Paris. Bored with the pleasant but undemanding routine, he requested a posting to Moscow in 1937. The two and a half years he spent in the Soviet Union formed the first third of his best-known book, the autobiographical Eastern Approaches.

Maclean was in Moscow until late 1939, and was present during the great Stalinist purges, observing the fates of Bukharin and other Russian revolutionaries. Although he was stationed in the capital, Maclean travelled extensively, primarily by train, into remote regions of the USSR which were off limits to foreigners, and was shadowed by the NKVD as he did so.

== Second World War ==
When the Second World War broke out in 1939, Maclean was prevented from joining the military because of his position as a diplomat: he was Second Secretary in the Foreign Office. Therefore, he resigned from the Diplomatic Service "to go into politics". After tendering his resignation he immediately took a taxi to the nearest recruiting office and enlisted as a private in the Queen's Own Cameron Highlanders. He was soon promoted to lance corporal before being commissioned in 1941. In that year he became the Conservative MP for Lancaster.

In North Africa in 1942, Maclean distinguished himself in the early actions of the newly-formed Special Air Service (SAS), where, with Ralph A. Bagnold, he developed ways of driving vehicles over the Libyan sand "seas". Maclean was a practitioner in the T. E. Lawrence brand of fighting, and he reported directly to Winston Churchill in Cairo. A letter of introduction from David Stirling said of him at the end of this period: "He has done well on our raids. Don't be taken in by his rather pompous manner or his slow way of speaking – he is OK."

=== Persia and Iraq ===
Later that year Maclean transferred to the Middle East as part of the Persia and Iraq Command. He was "allotted a platoon of Seaforth Highlanders and instructed to kidnap" General Fazlollah Zahedi, the commander of the Persian forces in the Isfahan area. Maclean captured him and smuggled him out by plane to internment in mandatory Palestine. This incident soon led Hitler's government to withdraw support from its network in Persia.

=== Yugoslavia ===
Churchill chose Maclean to lead a liaison mission (Macmis) to central Yugoslavia in 1943. Josip Broz Tito and his Partisans were emerging as a major obstacle to German control of the Balkans. Little was known at the time about Tito: some suspected this was an acronym for a committee or that he might, in fact, be a young woman. Maclean got to know Tito well, and later produced two biographies of him. Maclean's relationship with Tito's Partisans was not always easy, partly because they were communist, while he came from an upper class Scottish background, and had witnessed Stalinism in action (see above).

As Churchill personally told him, Maclean's mission was not to concern himself with how Yugoslavia was to be run after the war, but "simply to find out who was killing the most Germans and suggest means by which we could help them to kill more."

In 1944, together with Tito, Maclean planned and implemented Operation Ratweek. It was a major Allied bombing campaign in collaboration with the local Partisan troops in order to prevent German troops retreating back and reinforcing those in central and western Europe, thus prolonging the war.

His biography of Tito reveals the admiration he held for the Yugoslav leader and the Yugoslav Communist-led anti-fascist struggle. He developed a great affection for Yugoslavia and its people and was later given permission to buy a house on the Dalmatian island of Korčula, Croatia.

Having been appointed a Commander of the Order of the British Empire (CBE) in 1944, Maclean received the Order of Kutuzov (Soviet Union) (which impressed the Soviet troops in Belgrade), and after the war the Croix de Guerre (France), and the Partisan Star (Yugoslavia). Promoted to the rank of brigadier during the war, Maclean was accorded the local rank of major general on 16 June 1947.

Maclean was one of only two soldiers who during the Second World War enlisted in the British Army as a private and rose to the rank of brigadier, the other being future fellow Conservative MP Enoch Powell.

== Later life ==
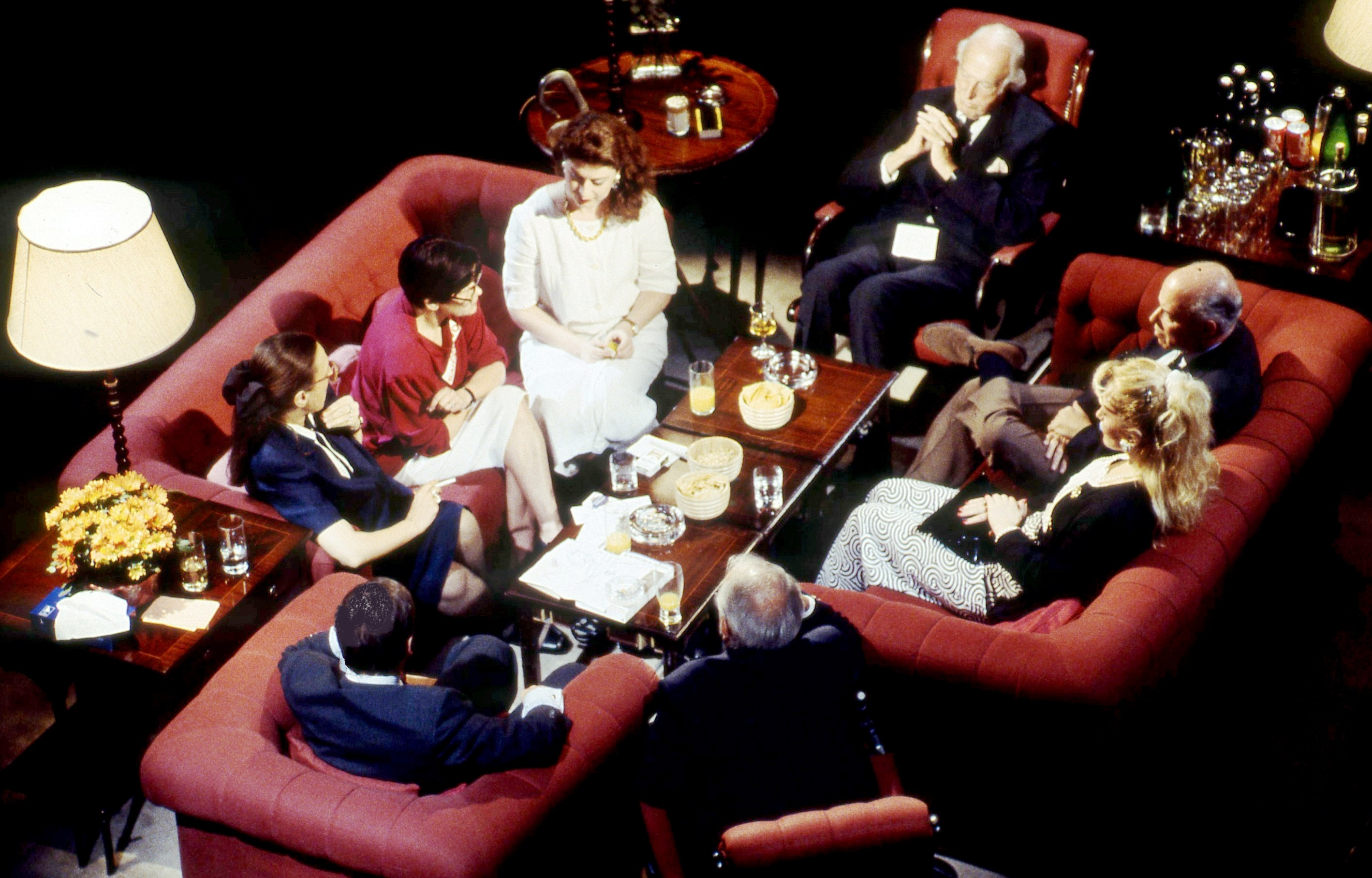
Maclean appearing (top) on television discussion programme After Dark "Bloody Bosnia" in 1993

Maclean was elected as Conservative Member of Parliament (MP) for Lancaster in the 1941 by-election. He was re-elected from Lancaster in 1945, 1950, 1951, and 1955. He served briefly as Financial Secretary to the War Office from 1954 to 1957. Harold Macmillan regretted losing him, "but he is really so hopeless in the House that he is a passenger in office... a great pity, since he is so able."

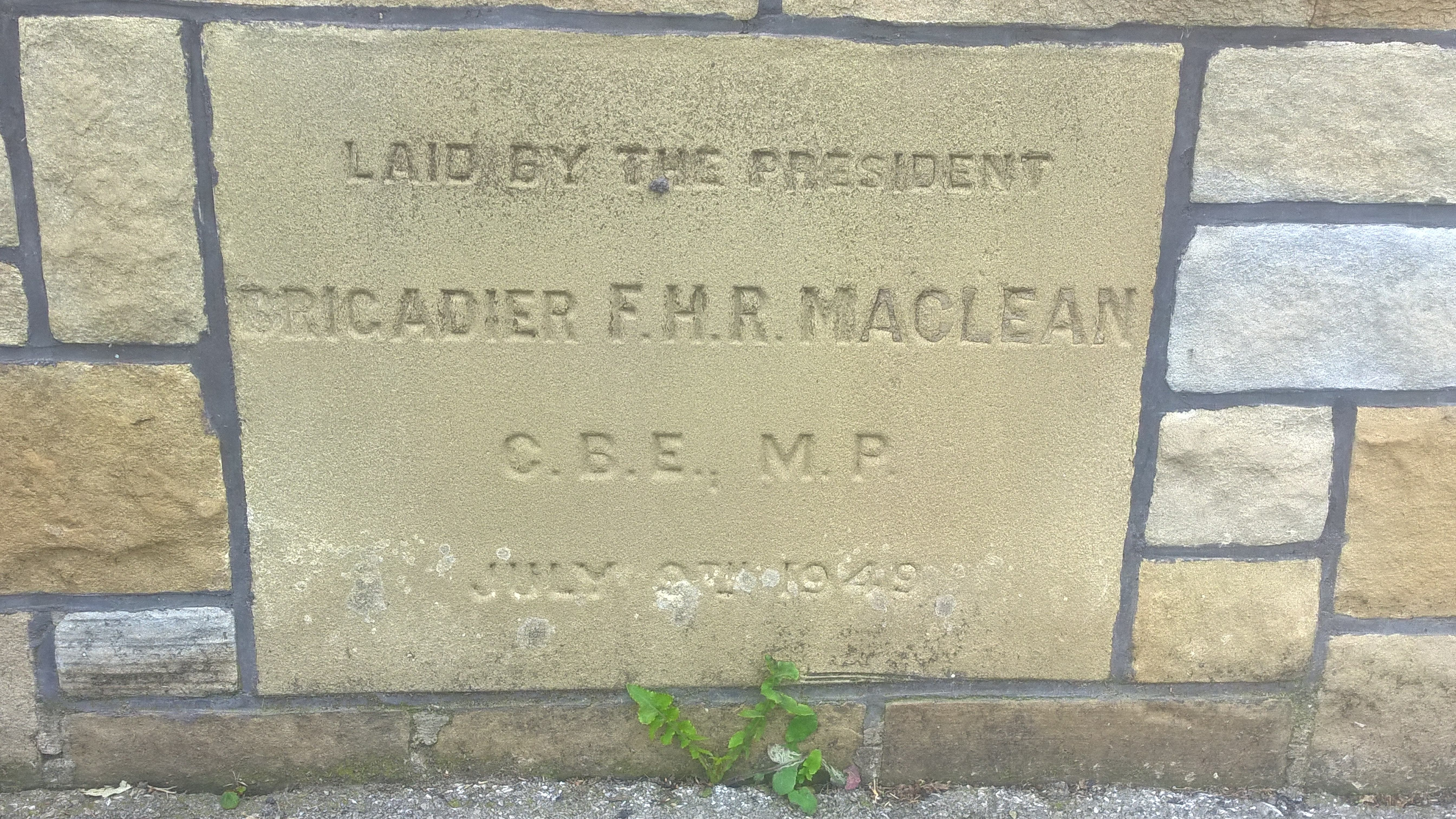
Overton Memorial Hall, Lancashire

On 9 July 1949, Maclean laid the foundation stone of the Overton & District Memorial Hall in his Lancaster constituency, where he was president of the committee that had raised the money to purchase the land and build it.

In 1957, Maclean and his wife purchased the Creggans Inn (and the surrounding estate) in Strachur, Scotland. Lady Veronica maintained the ownership after Maclean's death, and sold it in 2002.

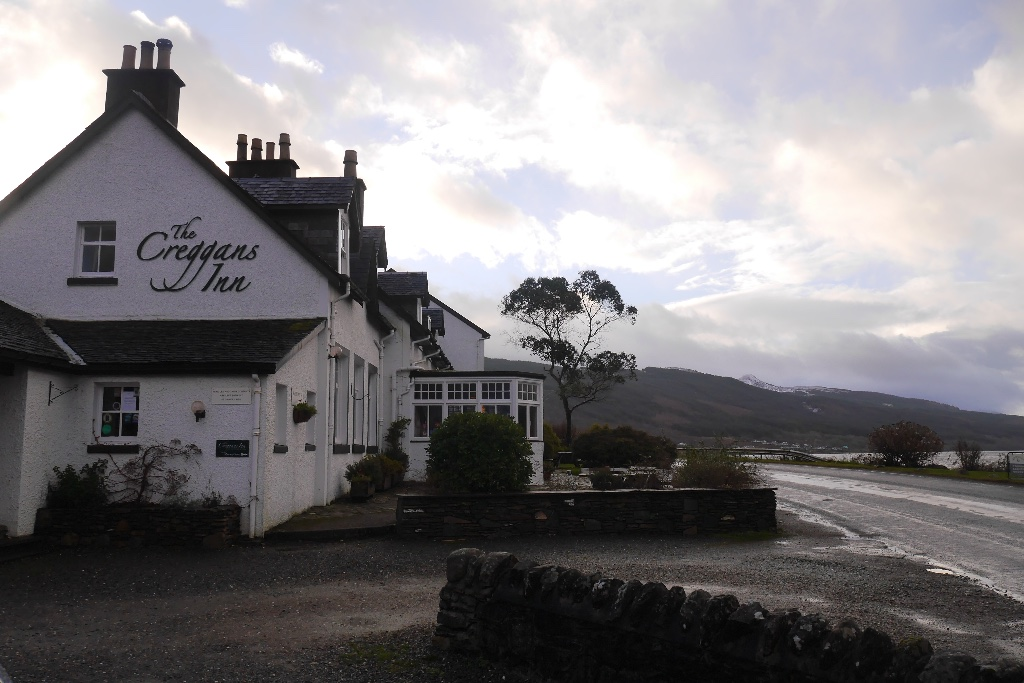
Creggans Inn in Strachur, Scotland

At the 1959 general election Maclean switched constituencies to Bute and North Ayrshire, where he was elected as a Unionist. He was re-elected as a Unionist in 1964, and as a Conservative in 1966 and 1970. He retired at the February 1974 general election. In his last two years, Maclean was appointed as a member of the Parliamentary Assembly of the Council of Europe and Western European Union.

Maclean was Executive Chairman (1959–1970) and later President (1977–1987) of the GB-USSR Association. The Association, funded by the Foreign and Commonwealth Office [FCO], was a semi-official organization for cultural relations with the Soviet Union.

He was mooted as a secret envoy to the government of Yugoslavia following the attempted assassination of Croatian dissident Nikola Štedul in Scotland in 1988.

In retirement Maclean wrote extensively. His wide range of subjects included: Scottish history, biographies (including Tito and Burgess), a Russian trilogy and assorted works of fiction. He also contributed to other books, for example writing the foreword to a 1984 biography of Joseph Wolff, the so-called "Eccentric Missionary" in whose footsteps he had travelled to Bukhara almost half a century before.

In 1964, he commissioned his wartime friend, fellow commando and yacht designer Alfred Mylne the Younger, to build the motor yacht Judi of Bute for use around the West Coast of Scotland. Maclean was Patron of Strachur and District Shinty Club. He collected an extensive library, including a full set of early editions of James Bond novels, which sold in September 2008 for £26,000.

In the late 1960s, Maclean bought Palazzo Boschi, a villa on the Adriatic island of Korčula (present-day Croatia), where he spent a good part of each year.

Yugoslav legislation at the time barred foreigners from buying real-estate property, but Tito intervened to allow Maclean to do so. The town of Korčula was declared a free city, and the Macleans were declared citizens; as soon as the purchase was registered with city authorities, the free city status was revoked.

In 1991, during the Croatian War of Independence, Maclean and his wife delivered medical supplies to the island of Korčula, with a substantial contribution from the people of Rothesay and Bute.

== Marriage ==
Maclean married the Hon. Veronica Nell Fraser-Phipps (1920–2005), a Roman Catholic, in 1946. She was a daughter of Simon Fraser, 14th Lord Lovat, and widow of naval officer, Lieutenant Alan Phipps, who was killed ashore at Leros in 1943.

Sir Fitzroy and Lady Maclean had two sons, and he was also stepfather to his wife's children from her first marriage: Major-General Jeremy Phipps and Suki Marlowe.

== Honours ==
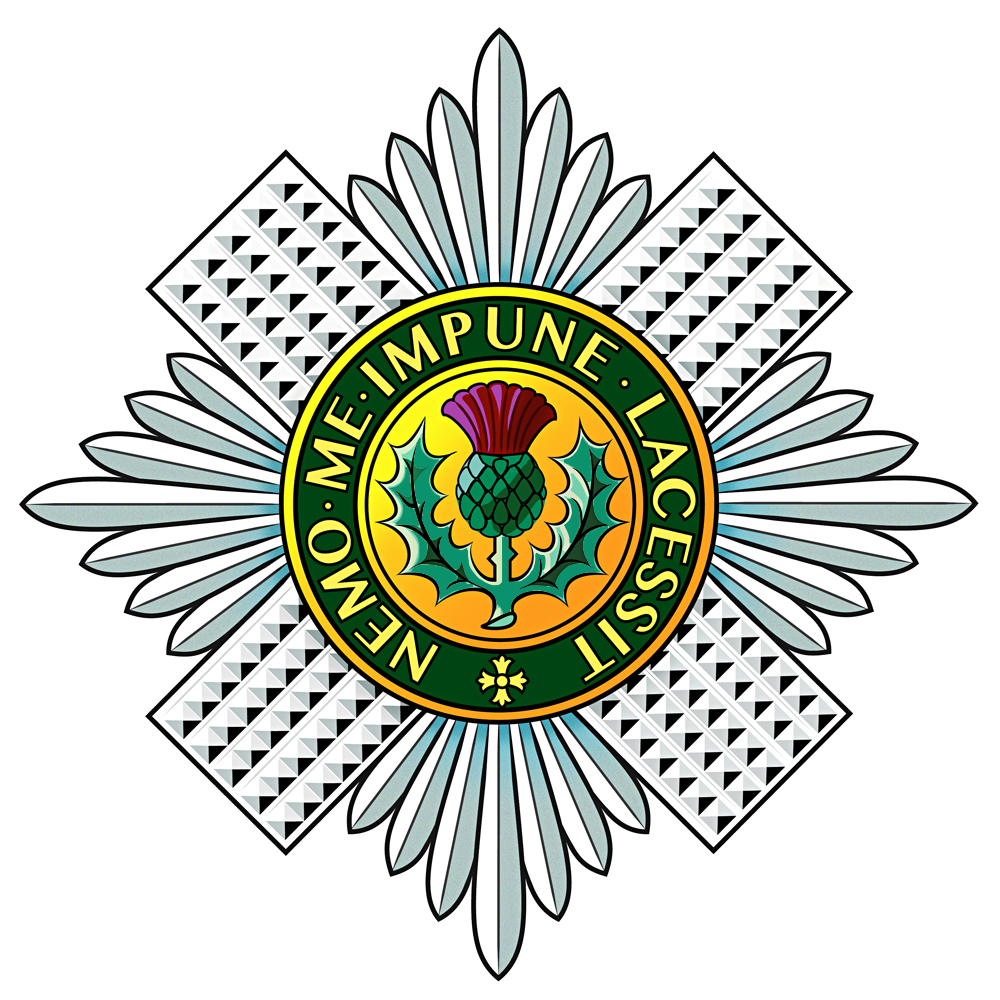

Among the many honours bestowed upon Sir Fitzroy Maclean were:

- Baronet (1957)
- Knight of the Thistle (1994)
- CBE (1944)
  - 15th Hereditary Keeper and Captain of Dunconnel Castle (1981).

== Death ==
Sir Fitzroy Maclean died on 15 June 1996, aged 85 in Offley, Hitchin, England. He was succeeded in the baronetcy by his elder son, the Much Honoured Sir Charles Maclean, Baron of Strachur, and 16th Hereditary Keeper and Captain of Dunconnel in the Isles of The Sea.

== Legacy ==
Maclean was posthumously awarded the Order of Prince Branimir for the humanitarian aid to Croatia, as well as contributing to international affirmation of Croatia. The decoration was presented by the Croatian President Stjepan Mesić in December 2001.

Maclean may have been one of the models for Ian Fleming's character James Bond.

== Styles and honours ==
- Fitzroy Maclean, Esq (1911–41)
- Fitzroy Maclean, MP (1941–44)
- Fitzroy Maclean, CBE, MP (1944–57)
- Sir Fitzroy Maclean of Strachur and Glensluian, Bt, CBE, MP (1957–74)
- Sir Fitzroy Maclean of Strachur and Glensluian, Bt, CBE (1974–81)
- Sir Fitzroy Maclean of Dunconnel, Bt, CBE (1981–94)
- Sir Fitzroy Maclean of Dunconnel, Bt, KT, CBE (1994–96)

Coat of arms of Sir Fitzroy Maclean, 1st Baronet
Coronet A Chapeau Gules furred Ermine. Crest A Lochaber Axe in pale between a branch of Laurel and a branch of Cypress in open chaplet all Proper. Escutcheon Quarterly, 1st Argent a Lion rampant Gules armed and langued Azure, 2nd Azure a Castle triple-towered Argent masoned Sable windows portcullis and flags Gules, 3rd Or a Dexter Hand couped fessways Gules holding a Cross-Crosslet fitchée Azure, 4th Or a Galley sails furled oars in saltire Sable flagged Gules in a Sea in base Vert a Salmon Argent, at the centre point a Portcullis Sable for difference.

== Bibliography ==
- Eastern Approaches, 1949
- The Heretic: the life and times of Josip Broz-Tito. 1957. Also published as Disputed Barricade: the life and times of Josip Broz-Tito, Marshal of Yugoslavia, 1957
- A Person from England and Other Travellers, 1958
- Back to Bokhara, 1959
- Yugoslavia, 1969
- Concise History of Scotland, 1970
- The Battle of Neretva, 1970
- The Back of Beyond: an illustrated companion to Central Asia and Mongolia, 1974
- To Caucasus, 1976
- Holy Russia, 1978
- Take Nine Spies, 1978
- Tito, 1980
- Josip Broz Tito: A Pictorial Biography, 1980 ISBN 0-07-044660-1
- The Isles of the Sea, 1985
- Portrait of the Soviet Union, 1988
- Bonnie Prince Charlie, 1988
- All the Russias, 1992
- Highlanders: A History of the Scottish Clans, 1995

== Biographies ==
- Maclean, Veronica (2002) Past Forgetting: a memoir of heroes, adventure, love and life with Fitzroy Maclean. London: Review ISBN 0-7553-1025-X.
- McLynn, Frank (1992) Fitzroy Maclean. London: John Murray ISBN 0-7195-4971-X.

== See also ==
- Special Operations Executive
- Balkan Air Force
- Yugoslav Partisans

Parliament of the United Kingdom
Preceded by Herwald Ramsbotham	Member of Parliament for Lancaster; 1941–1959	Succeeded by Humphry Berkeley
Preceded by Charles MacAndrew	Member of Parliament for Bute and North Ayrshire; 1959 – Feb 1974	Succeeded by John Corrie
Baronetage of the United Kingdom
New creation	Baronet (of Strachur and Glensluain); 1957–1996	Succeeded by Sir Charles Edward Maclean
