= Earl of Eldon =

Earldom in the Peerage of the United Kingdom

- Blazon Arms: Argent, three Lion’s Heads erased Gules, in chief an Anchor erect Sable, on a Chief wavy Azure, a Portcullis with chains Or. Crest: A Lion’s Head erased Gules, gorged with a Chain and pendant therefrom a Portcullis Or.Supporters: On either side a Lion guardant proper, gorged with a Double Chain and pendant therefrom a Portcullis with chains Or.
- Creation date: 7 July 1821
- Created by: King George IV
- Peerage: Peerage of the United Kingdom
- First holder: John Scott, 1st Earl of Eldon
- Present holder: John Scott, 6th Earl of Eldon
- Heir apparent: John Scott, Viscount Encombe
- Subsidiary titles: Viscount Encombe; Baron Eldon
- Status: Extant
- Motto: Sit sine labe decus (English: Let honour be without stain)

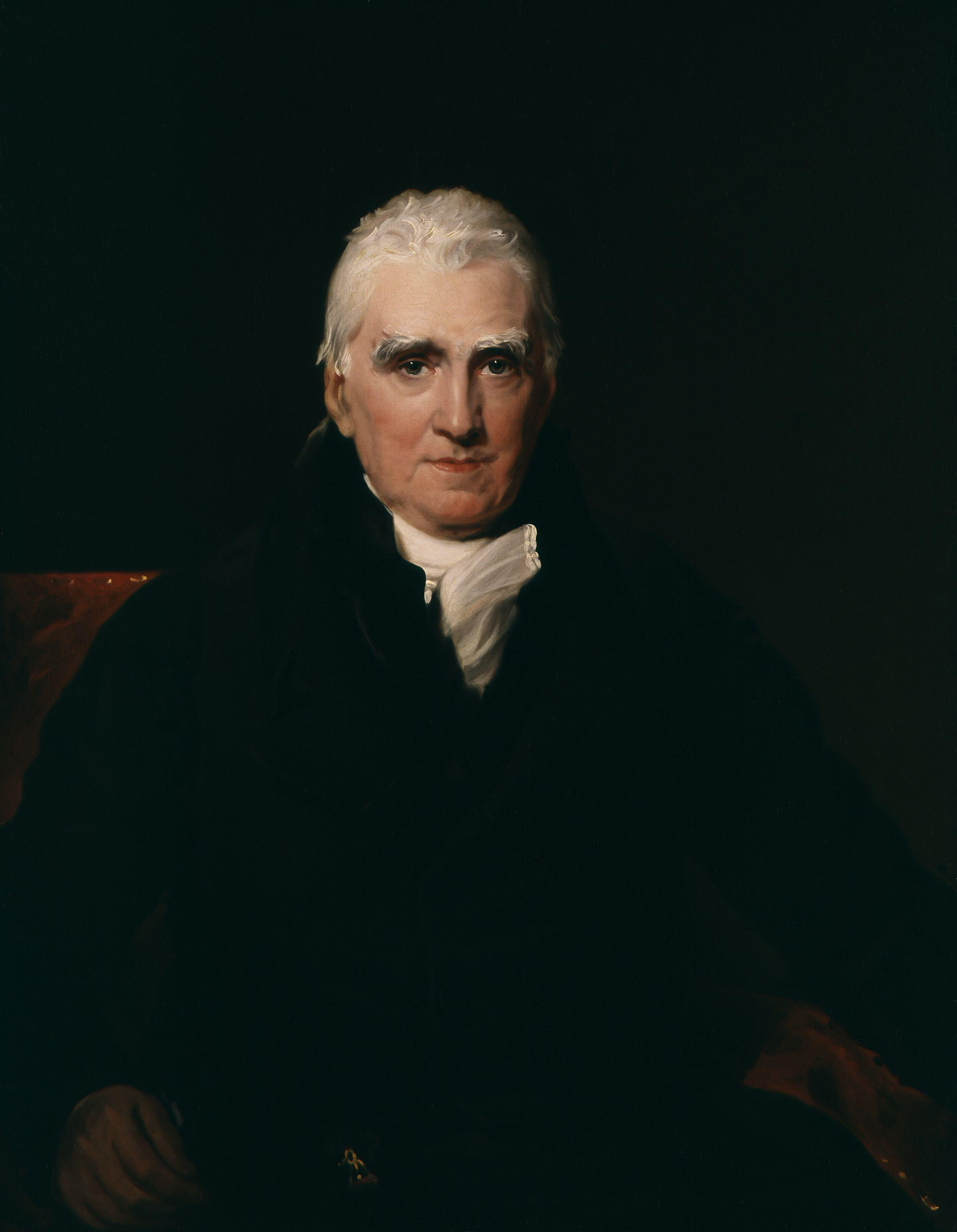
John Scott, 1st Earl of Eldon

Earl of Eldon, in the County Palatine of Durham, is a title in the Peerage of the United Kingdom. It was created in 1821 for the lawyer and politician John Scott, 1st Baron Eldon, Lord Chancellor from 1801 to 1806 and again from 1807 to 1827. He had already been created Baron Eldon, of Eldon in the County Palatine of Durham, in the Peerage of Great Britain in 1799, and was made Viscount Encombe, of Encombe in the County of Dorset, at the same time was given the earldom. His grandson, the second Earl, briefly represented Truro in the House of Commons.

As of 2017 the titles are held by the latter's great-great-great-grandson, the sixth Earl, who succeeded his father in 2017.

William Scott, 1st Baron Stowell, was the elder brother of the first Earl of Eldon. The Hon. Sir Ernest Scott, second son of the third Earl, was Envoy Extraordinary and Minister Plenipotentiary to Uruguay.

The family seat was, until the 20th century, Encombe Park, near Kingston in Dorset.

== Earls of Eldon and Viscounts Encombe (1821) and Barons Eldon (1799) ==
- John Scott (1751–1838), 1st Earl of Eldon, Viscount Encombe and Baron Eldon
  - Hon. John Scott (1774–1805)
- John Scott (1805–1854), 2nd Earl of Eldon, Viscount Encombe and Baron Eldon
- John Scott, 3rd Earl of Eldon (1845–1926), Viscount Encombe and Baron Eldon
  - John Scott (1870–1900), styled Viscount Encombe
- John Scott (1899–1976), 4th Earl of Eldon, Viscount Encombe and Baron Eldon
- John Joseph Nicholas Scott (1937–2017), 5th Earl of Eldon, Viscount Encombe and Baron Eldon
- John Francis Thomas Marie Joseph Columba Fidelis "Jock" Scott, 6th Earl of Eldon, Viscount Encombe and Baron Eldon (b. 1962)
  - John James Robert Columba Scott (b. 1996), styled Viscount Encombe (heir apparent)

== Present peer ==
John Francis "Jock" Scott, 6th Earl of Eldon (born 9 July 1962) is the son of the 5th Earl and his wife Countess Claudine de Montjoye-Vaufrey et de la Roche and was educated at Ampleforth College. He was styled as Viscount Encombe between 1976 and 30 January 2017, when he succeeded to his father's peerages.

He married Charlotte de Vlaming, and they have two children:

- Lady Helena Rose Columba Scott (born 1994)
- John James Robert Columba Scott, Viscount Encombe (born 1996), the heir apparent.

== See also ==
- Baron Stowell
- Ships called Earl of Eldon or Lord Eldon
- Bedford Square
