= Carlen v Drury =

1812 UK partnership law case

- Court: Court of Chancery
- Decided: 24 December 1812
- Citation: (1812) 35 ER 61, (1812) 1 Vesey & Beames 154

Court membership
- Judges sitting: Lord Eldon LC, Sir Samuel Romilly

Keywords
- Partnership, litigation

Carlen v Drury (1812) 35 ER 61 is a UK partnership law case, which is often cited for a broader principle in UK company law that the court generally does not allow litigation by members where a procedure for redress is set out in the articles of association.

== Facts ==
The Bankside Brewery was a partnership, composed of three hundred people, that began on 21 June 1808 for a term of 99 years. Drury was one of three managers, and the regulations of the partnership contained a provision for managers to be removed on a vote of the annual general meeting on Lady Day, Michaelmas. In the case of alleged misbehaviour, a special general meeting could be called by a committee of twelve partners who audited the accounts. The partnership could be dissolved after two consecutive votes of three quarters of all the partners, with another subsequent confirmation vote in general meeting.

Six of the committee partners alleged that the managers and the other six committee partners were guilty of gross mismanagement, and applied to court directly for an injunction to dissolve the partnership, and appoint a receiver.

== Judgment ==
Sir Samuel Romilly and Lord Eldon held that the court had no jurisdiction to interfere with the partnership. In the first instance, the right of redress for the aggrieved partners was the procedures set out in the regulations of the partnership itself. Lord Eldon's judgment said the following.

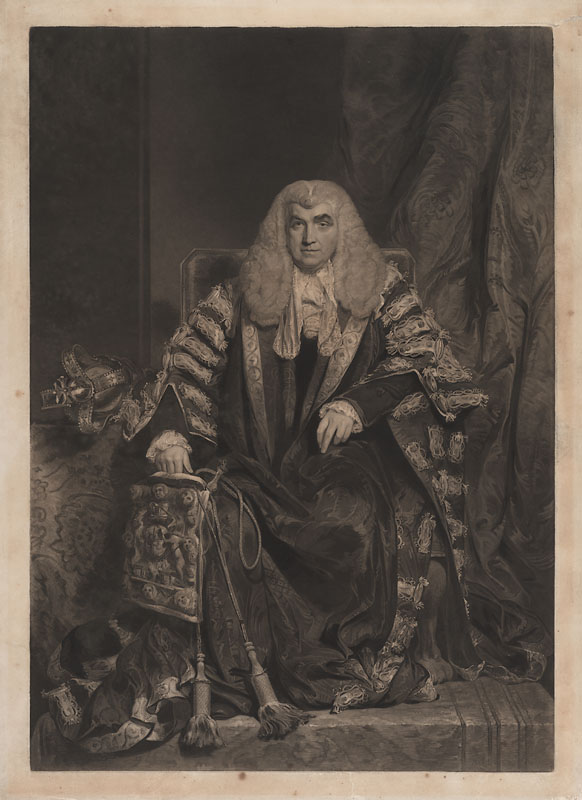
Lord Eldon.

I hold it to be clear in the first Place, that, according to the Rule of Law the Person, who takes upon himself the Management, is answerable to the whole Extent of his Engagements: secondly, that each Individual is at Law answerable for the Amount of the whole of the Debts of the Concern; and thirdly, that each Individual is liable to a Contribution for what the Agents have paid: but, where the Nature of the Institution necessarily requires a great Number of Persons to be concerned, it is impossible for the strong Arm of the Law, however powerful, to grasp them all. In the present Instance, there is not only nothing to prevent, but the very Terms of the Articles provide, that One Thousand Six Hundred Persons may eventually be interested in the Concern. I agree with what has been urged for the Plaintiffs, that, if the Means of Redress, provided by the Parties themselves in the Articles, are not effectual, this Court will interfere. These Parties have however put themselves under the Controul of a Committee as to many Things of considerable Importance to their Interest. They seem to have been aware of the Inconvenience, arising from the Number of Proprietors; and, as it was material for them to guard against Disputes, so likely to be generated under this Order of Things, Managers are provided; and that this might not be insufficient, Two annual Meetings are to be held.

It is true, those Meetings are to be at the Discretion of the Managers: but I have no Difficulty in saying, that this Court would compel the Managers to appoint Meetings; this being but casus omissus in the Articles. They likewise provide for removing the Managers; and, not trusting entirely to their Providence, make a Provision for a standing Committee of Twelve Persons. If the Conduct of the Managers came under the Discussion of this Committee, there must, as I construe the Articles, be a subsequent Meeting; to determine, whether the Managers should be dismissed, or not: but the Articles provide, that a Dissolution shall only take place in One Instance. Here, however, I observe, that there is a Principle of a Court of Equity paramount these Agreements, in respect of which this Court will interfere; but not in the first Instance. In order to obtain that Interference a Case of Breach of Engagement, or Abuse of Trust, must be established to the perfect Satisfaction of the Court; that Persons will not according to their Duty attend to the Interest of the Concern. The Managers of this Concern are entrusted to a great Extent to increase the Capital at their Discretion; which I take to be a very material Circumstance. This Court is not to be required on every Occasion to take the Management of every Playhouse and Brewhouse in the Kingdom: but, if the Case justifies the Interference of the Court it may appoint a Manager in the Interim, for the Purpose of winding up, and putting an End to, the Concern. (Forman v Homfray, 2 V&B 329) The Court however is not at once to assume, that the Committee will not act. Here are twelve Trustees. Is it then founded in Contract, that Six can come here? That is a Case actually shut out. They come here then, on the Ground, not that the Contract furnishes no Redress, but that there is bad Management.

Suppose, that after the Appointment of a Receiver the second Meeting should take place; and it should be decided at that Meeting, that the Concern should go on as usual, or in some other Manner differently from the Course I had ordered: what would be the Result? If however, a Case of Delinquency should be clearly made out, I do not hesitate to declare, the Court would act: but there must be a positive Necessity for the Interference of the Court, arising from the Refusal or Neglect of the Committee to act. That may raise a Case for prompt and immediate Interference; which I cannot say exists at present. I express no Opinion upon the Questions, whether this is a legal Partnership; and taking it to be so, whether the Plaintiffs can file a Bill for a Dissolution on behalf of near Three Hundred other Persons (Beaumont v Meredith, 3 V&B 180); observing merely the Difficulty, that must arise, if those other Persons wish the Partnership to be carried on; and, if the Society be answerable to the Managers, and bound to a Contribution to Losses, &c., whether any one can institute a Suit here without offering to contribute: but, confining myself to the Object of the present Motion, I think I cannot now interfere: the Plaintiffs having a Remedy in their own Hands, to which they have not resorted: desiring to be understood, not to repudiate the Jurisdiction; but that I will not interfere, before the Parties have tried that Jurisdiction, which the Articles have themselves provided. (See Waters v Taylor, 15 Ves 10)

The Motion was refused with Costs.

== See also ==
- UK company law
- UK partnership law
