= Simon Fraser, 14th Lord Lovat =

Scottish aristocrat (1871–1933)

Major-General The Right Honourable The Lord Lovat KT GCVO KCMG CB DSO
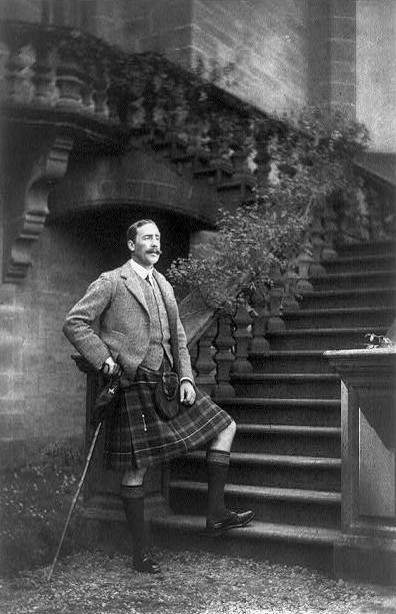
- Lord Lovat in 1908

Under-Secretary of State for Dominion Affairs
- In office 1926–1927
- Preceded by: The Earl of Clarendon
- Succeeded by: The Earl of Plymouth

Personal details
- Born: Simon Joseph Fraser; 25 November 1871
- Died: 18 February 1933 (aged 61) London, England
- Spouse: Hon. Laura Lister (m. 1910)
- Children: Simon Fraser, 15th Lord Lovat; Magdalen Scott, Countess of Eldon; Sir Hugh Fraser; Veronica, Lady MacLean; Rose Fraser
- Parent(s): Simon Fraser, 13th Lord Lovat; Alice Maria Weld-Blundell
- Education: Fort Augustus Abbey
- Alma mater: Magdalen College, Oxford

Military service
- Allegiance: United Kingdom
- Branch/service: British Army
- Years of service: 1890–1919
- Rank: Major-General
- Unit: Queen's Own Cameron Highlanders; 1st Life Guards
- Commands: 4th Mounted Division; Highland Mounted Brigade
- Battles/wars: Second Boer War; First World War
- Awards: Knight Commander of the Order of St Michael and St George; Companion of the Order of the Bath; Distinguished Service Order; Mentioned in Despatches; Officer of the Legion of Honour (France); Commander of the Order of Agricultural Merit (France); Commander of the Order of the Crown (Belgium)

Major-General Simon Joseph Fraser, 14th Lord Lovat and 3rd Baron Lovat, KT, GCVO, KCMG, CB, DSO (25 November 1871 – 18 February 1933) was a Scottish aristocrat, British Army officer, landowner, politician and the 23rd Chief of Clan Fraser of Lovat.

== Early life ==
Fraser was born into a leading Scottish Roman Catholic family on 25 November 1871, the eldest surviving son of nine children born to Simon Fraser, 13th Lord Lovat, and Alice Maria Weld-Blundell. Among his siblings were Mary Laura Fraser (wife of John Scott, Viscount Encombe and mother of John Scott, 4th Earl of Eldon), Alice Mary Charlotte Fraser (wife of Bernard Constable-Maxwell and mother of Gerald Maxwell), Etheldreada Mary Fraser (wife of diplomat Sir Francis Oswald Lindley), Hugh Joseph Fraser, a Major with the Scots Guards who was killed in the First Battle of Ypres during World War I), Alastair Thomas Joseph Fraser (husband of Lady Sibyl Grimston, daughter of James Grimston, 3rd Earl of Verulam), Margaret Mary Fraser (wife of Brig.-Gen. Archibald Stirling and mother of Bill and Sir David Stirling) and Muriel Mary Rose Fraser, who became a Catholic nun. His father served as Lord Lieutenant of Inverness and aide-de-camp to Queen Victoria from 1883 to 1887.

Educated at Fort Augustus Abbey and Magdalen College, Oxford, he was an active member of the Oxford University polo team and left with an MA.

== Military career ==
Lord Lovat was commissioned into the Queen's Own Cameron Highlanders and promoted lieutenant in 1890, but transferred as a lieutenant into the 1st Life Guards in 1894. In 1897, he resigned from the Regular Army and joined a volunteer battalion of the Queen's Own Cameron Highlanders.

=== Boer War and Lovat Scouts ===
In late 1899, Fraser raised the Lovat Scouts for service in the Second Boer War in South Africa, and from February 1900 served as the scouts' second-in-command with the rank of captain, in charge of the mounted infantry. For the Lovat Scouts, he chose the best marksmen he could find and the perfect commander in Andrew David Murray. The corps arrived in South Africa in early 1900, and was attached to the Black Watch, but was disbanded in July 1901 while two companies (the 113th and 114th) were formed for the Imperial Yeomanry. Lord Lovat continued as second-in-command of the two companies until Colonel Murray was killed in a night action with a Boer Commando on 19/20 September 1901, after which Fraser took command of the regiment himself (now aged 29), and remained in command until the end of the war.

The war ended in June 1902, and Lord Lovat relinquished his commission with the Imperial Yeomanry and was granted the honorary rank of major in the army on 11 July 1902. He returned to the United Kingdom with the corps on the SS Tintagel Castle the following month, arriving to a public welcome in Inverness in late August. For his service in the war, he was mentioned in despatches (including the final despatch by Lord Kitchener dated 23 June 1902), was awarded the Distinguished Service Order (DSO) in 1900, and appointed a Companion of the Order of the Bath (CB) in October 1902.

After the end of the Second Boer War, the remaining two companies returned to the United Kingdom and were disbanded. The unit was reformed the following year, consisting of two regiments, titled the 1st and 2nd Lovat Scouts. From these scouts a sharpshooter unit was formed and formally became the British Army's first sniper unit.

Lord Lovat was appointed a Commander of the Royal Victorian Order (CVO) in 1903 by King Edward VII. He later served as aide-de-camp to King George V. On 1 April 1908 he was placed in command of a mounted brigade of the newly created Territorial Force (TF) and was granted the temporary rank of colonel whilst so employed.

=== First World War ===
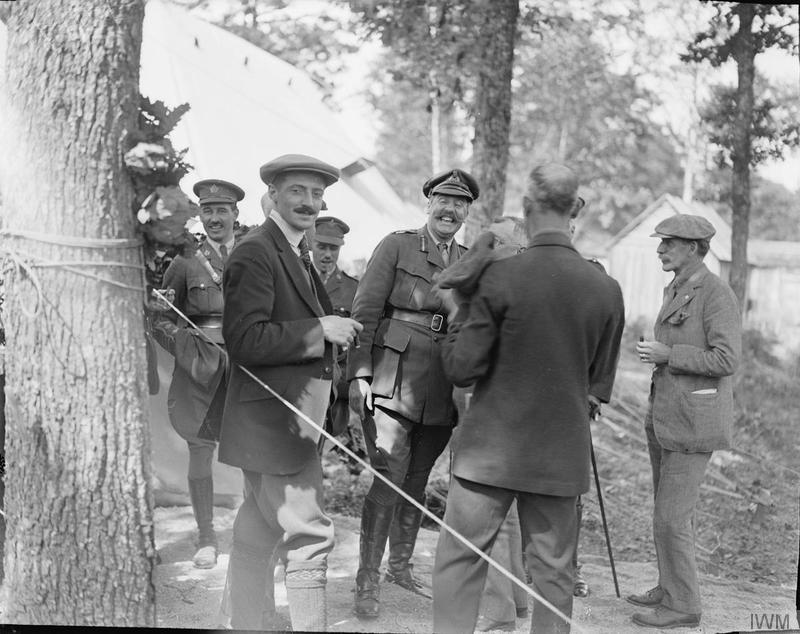
General Simon Fraser, the 14th Lord Lovat and 3rd Baron Lovat, receiving the Canadian journalists on their visit to No. 14 Company Canadian Forestry Corps at Conches Forest, 22 July 1918.

In the First World War, Lord Lovat commanded the Highland Mounted Brigade of the 2nd Mounted Division, being promoted to brigadier general in September 1914. He was appointed a Knight of the Thistle in 1915 for demonstrable leadership and courage. In March 1916, he took command of the 4th Mounted Division and became a major general two months later. He became a Rhodes Trustee in 1917, the same year as Rudyard Kipling.

In 1919, Lovat was appointed a Knight Commander of the Order of St Michael and St George and was appointed Chairman of the Army Forestry Commission, serving from 1919 to 1927.

=== Political career ===
Apart from a military career Lovat was also Chairman of the Forestry Commission from 1919 to 1927 and served in the Conservative administration of Stanley Baldwin as Under-Secretary of State for Dominion Affairs from 1927 to 1929.

== Personal life ==
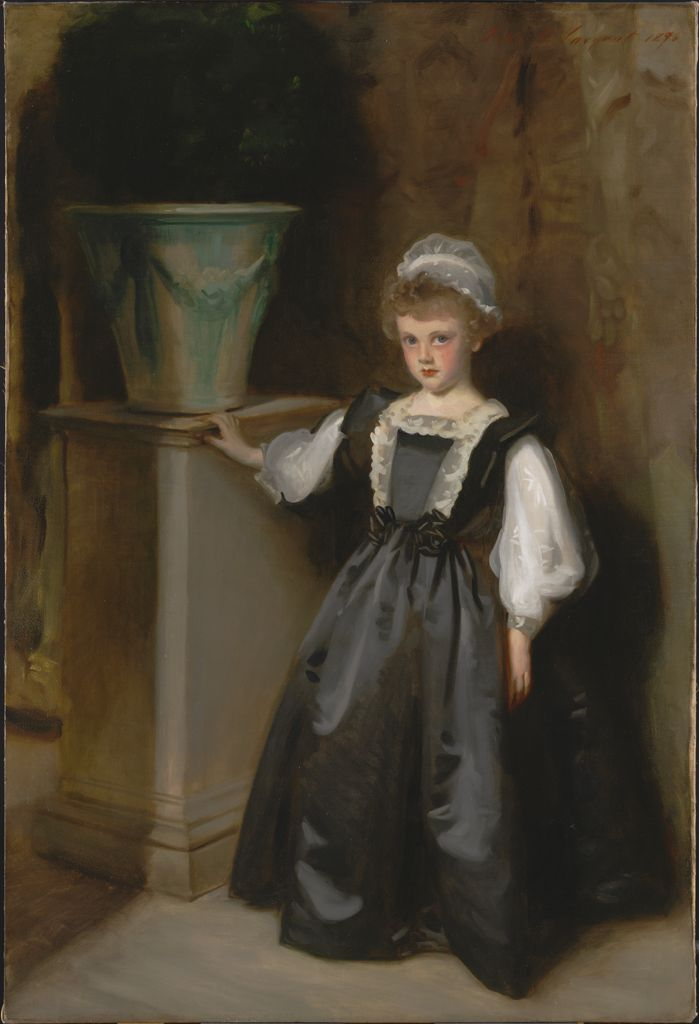
Childhood portrait of Laura Lister by John Singer Sargent

In February 1910, Lord Lovat was rumoured to be engaged to an American heiress, Edith Clark, a daughter of Charles S. Clark of New York and Grosvenor Square, London. However, on 15 October 1910, Lovat married the Hon. Laura Lister (1892–1965), the second daughter of Thomas Lister, 4th Baron Ribblesdale and, his first wife, Charlotte Monkton Tennant (a daughter of Sir Charles Tennant, 1st Baronet, MP for Peebles and Selkirk). Among the Fraser family estates was Beaufort Castle in Scotland (rebuilt by his father in the late 1870s) and 181,800 acres of land. Together, they were the parents of five children, four of whom lived to maturity:

- Simon Christopher Joseph Fraser, 15th Lord Lovat (1911–1995), who married Rosamond Delves Broughton, the only daughter of Sir Henry Broughton, 11th Baronet, in 1938.
- Magdalen Mary Charlotte Fraser (1913–1969), who married her cousin John Scott, 4th Earl of Eldon, a Royal Auxiliary Air Force officer and was the mother of John Scott, 5th Earl of Eldon.
- Sir Hugh Charles Patrick Joseph Fraser (1918–1984), an MP for Stafford and Stone, Under-Secretary of State for the Colonies, and Secretary of State for Air who married author Lady Antonia Margaret Caroline Pakenham, a daughter of Frank Pakenham, 7th Earl of Longford and Elizabeth Pakenham, Countess of Longford, in 1956. They divorced in 1977.
- Veronica Nell Fraser (1920–2005), a food writer and hotelier who married Lt. Alan Phipps of the Royal Navy in 1940. After his death in 1944, she married Sir Fitzroy Maclean, 1st Baronet in 1946.
- Mary Diana Rose Fraser (1926–1940), who died at age 14.

Lovat died of a heart attack in London in February 1933, aged 61, and was succeeded by his eldest son Simon as the 15th Lord Lovat (known as the 17th Lord), who distinguished himself during the D-Day landings at Normandy in June 1944.

=== Descendants ===
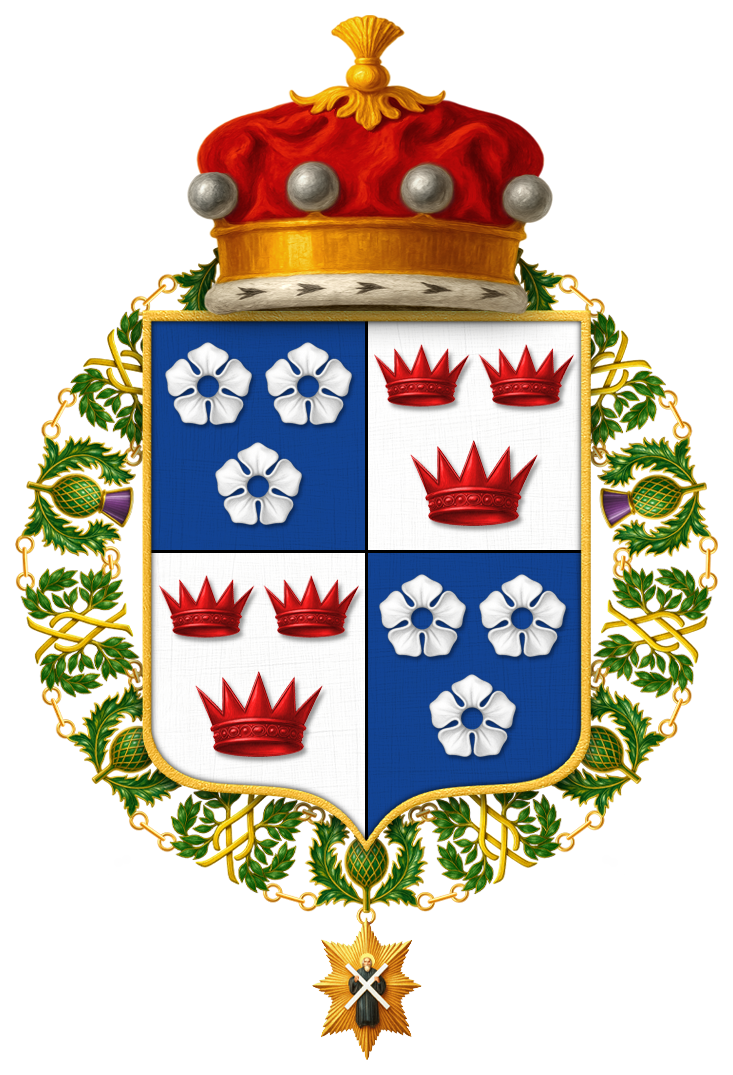
Shield of Arms of Simon Joseph Fraser, 14th Lord Lovat and 3rd Baron Lovat, KT, GCVO, KCMG, CB, DSO

Through his eldest son Simon, he was a grandfather of six, including Simon Fraser, Master of Lovat (1939–1994), Fiona Mary Fraser (b. 1941) (wife of Robin Richard Allen), Annabel Thérèse "Tessa" Fraser (b. 1942) (wife of Hugh Mackay, 14th Lord Reay and Sir Henry Keswick), Kim Ian Maurice Fraser (1946–2020), Hugh Alastair Joseph Fraser (1947–2011) (husband of Drusilla Jane Montgomerie), Andrew Roy Matthew Fraser (1952–1994) (husband of Lady Charlotte Anne Greville, a daughter of David Greville, 8th Earl of Warwick).

Through his daughter Magdalen, he was a grandfather of three, including John Joseph Nicholas Scott, 5th Earl of Eldon (1937–2017) and Simon Peter Scott (b. 1939).

Through his son Sir Hugh, he was a grandfather of six, including Rebecca Rose Fraser (b. 1957), Flora Fraser (b. 1958), Benjamin Hugh Fraser (b. 1961), Natasha Fraser (b. 1963), Damian Fraser (b. 1964), and Orlando Fraser (b. 1967).

Government offices
New title	Chairman of the Forestry Commission; 1919–1927	Succeeded by The Lord Clinton
Political offices
Preceded by The Earl of Clarendon	Under-Secretary of State for Dominion Affairs; 1926–1927	Succeeded by The Earl of Plymouth
Honorary titles
Preceded by Simon Fraser	MacShimidh; 1887–1933	Succeeded by Simon Fraser
Peerage of Scotland
Preceded by Simon Fraser	Lord Lovat; 1887–1933	Succeeded by Simon Fraser
Peerage of the United Kingdom
Preceded by Simon Fraser	Baron Lovat; 1887–1933	Succeeded by Simon Fraser
