= Veronica Maclean =

British food writer and hotelier

The Honourable Lady Maclean
- Born: Veronica Nell Fraser; 2 December 1920; London, England
- Died: 7 January 2005 (aged 84); Strachur, Scotland
- Known for: Culinary writing
- Spouse(s): Alan Phipps (1940–1943; his death); Fitzroy Maclean (1946–1996; his death)
- Children: Susan Phipps (b. 1941); Jeremy Phipps (1942–2021); Charles Maclean (b. 1946); Alexander Maclean (b. 1949)
- Parent(s): The 16th Lord Lovat; Hon. Laura Lister
- Relatives: David Stirling (cousin)

Veronica, Lady Maclean (née Fraser, formerly Phipps; 2 December 1920 – 7 January 2005) was a Scottish food writer and hotelier. Her family owned Creggans Inn on the shores of Loch Fyne in Argyll. Her first book pioneered recipes that she had collected from family and friends which she described as family or country house cooking, as opposed to the classical French haute cuisine, which was the universal style in hotels and restaurants in the 1960s.

Her first book, Lady Maclean's Cook Book (1965), was enlivened by such dishes as the Duchess of Devonshire's fish soup, Lady Diana Cooper's blackcurrant leaf ice, Lady Lovat's oxtail, Fitz's "plov from Samarkand" - and went through several printings. Her other cookery books included Lady Maclean's Diplomatic Dishes (1975), Lady Maclean's Book of Sauces and Surprises (1978) and Lady Maclean's Second Helpings and More Diplomatic Dishes (1984).

== Life ==
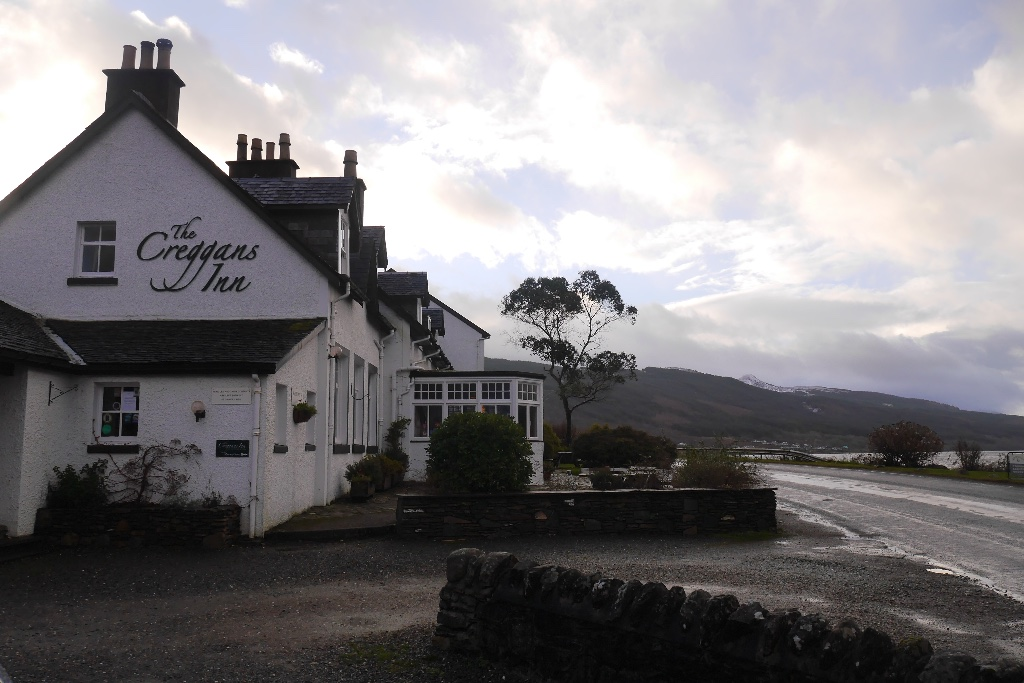
Creggans Inn in Strachur, Scotland

Veronica Nell Fraser was born in London on 2 December 1920, the fourth of five children of the 16th Lord Lovat. After service in a mobile ambulance unit in France at the start of the Second World War, she met and married in 1940 Lieutenant Alan Phipps, who — after serving with distinction on the Arctic Convoys and in the Mediterranean — was killed ashore at Leros in 1943, leaving his wife a widow at 23 with two children. In 1946 she married Fitzroy Maclean, who had served as an officer with her cousin David Stirling in North Africa at the foundation of the SAS. After serving as MP for Lancaster from 1941, Maclean was made a baronet in 1957, in turn making his wife Lady Maclean. Maclean then served as MP for Bute and North Ayrshire from 1959 until the February 1974 general election.

Lady Maclean (a Roman Catholic) had two children from her first marriage to Alan Phipps, Susan Rose "Sukie" Phipps (born 1941) and Jeremy Julian Phipps (born 1942), who were brought up in their mother's faith. Sukie married the writer Derek Marlowe, and is stepmother to autistic savant Derek Paravicini. Jeremy became a Major-General in the British army, having served in the SAS. Sir Fitzroy and Lady Maclean had two sons: Charles Edward (born 1946) and Alexander James Simon Aeneas (born 1949), who were not brought up in their mother's faith.

Lady Maclean featured in an episode of Keith Floyd's BBC cooking show Floyd on Britain and Ireland in 1988. The episode was filmed in May and broadcast in the winter.

Lady Maclean died at home on 7 January 2005, aged 84, at Strachur House, Strachur, Argyll and Bute. Sir Fitzroy had died of a heart attack on 15 June 1996 whilst visiting friends in Hertfordshire, England.

== Publications ==
- Veronica Maclean (1965), Lady Maclean's Cook Book. London: HarperCollins. ISBN 0004112598
- Veronica Maclean (1975), Diplomatic Dishes. London: HarperCollins. ISBN 0002161184
- Veronica Maclean (1984), Lady Maclean's Second Helpings and More Diplomatic Dishes. London: HarperCollins. ISBN 0002173565
- Veronica Maclean (1986), Lady MacLean's Book of Sauces and Surprises. London: HarperCollins. ISBN 000411275X
- Veronica Maclean (2002), Past Forgetting. London: Headline. ISBN 0755310241. (Autobiography)
