= Louisa Scott, Countess of Eldon =

Louisa Scott, Countess of Eldon (16 November 1807 – 18 November 1852), formerly the Hon. Louisa Duncombe, was the wife of John Scott, 2nd Earl of Eldon.

She was the daughter of Charles Duncombe, 1st Baron Feversham, by his wife, the former Lady Charlotte Legge. She married the earl on 1 October 1831, some years prior to his succeeding his grandfather in the earldom, when he was known as Viscount Encombe. They had a stillborn son in 1832 before successfully parenting a further seven children:

- Lady Selina Jane Scott (died 1891), who married Nathaniel Bond and had 3 children; John Wentworth Garneys Bond, Walter de Grey Bond and Rev. Raymond Alured Bond.
- Lady Rachel Adela Scott (died 1869), who died unmarried
- Lady Charlotte Elizabeth Scott (1834-1864), who married Rev. Canon Eldon Surtees Bankes and had 5 children; Arthur Eldon Bankes, Louisa Bankes, Eustace Ralph Bankes, Herbert Stowell Bankes and Charlotte Helen Bankes.
- Lady Augusta Henrietta Scott (13 May 1836 – 4 November 1906), who married Thomas Francis Fremantle, 2nd Baron Cottesloe, and had 6 children; Mary Louisa Fremantle, Col Thomas Francis Fremantle, 3rd Baron Cottesloe; Reginald Scott Fremantle, Gertrude Charlotte Fremantle and Walter Fremantle.
- Lady Katherine Frances Scott (15 December 1837- 19 May 1903), who married Gustavus Russell Hamilton-Russell, 8th Viscount Boyne. After her marriage she was known as Viscountess Boyne. They had 13 children.
- Lady Gertrude Louisa Scott (6 May 1841- 30 April 1919), who married Lt.-Col. Lord Eustace Cecil and had 3 children; Evelyn Cecil, Blanche Louisa Gascoyne-Cecil and Algernon Gascoyne-Cecil.
- John Scott, 3rd Earl of Eldon (8 November 1845 – 10 August 1926), he married Henrietta Minna Turnor and they had 7 children.

In the period of their marriage, parts of the Eldon estate were sold off for industrial purposes, notably for the building of the Clarence Railway and Little Chilton Colliery.

She died, aged 45, in London, after a short illness. A few months later, Lord Eldon was found by a "Commission of Lunacy" to be of unsound mind. It was said that he had suffered from partial dementia since 1851 but that his wife "had managed the property of her husband, and had also managed him with great affection and tact". He survived the countess by two years and died in September 1854, aged 48. He was succeeded in the earldom by his only son, John.
