= Strachur =

Coordinates: 56.167111°N 5.0681528°W

Strachur: Scottish Gaelic: Srath Chura
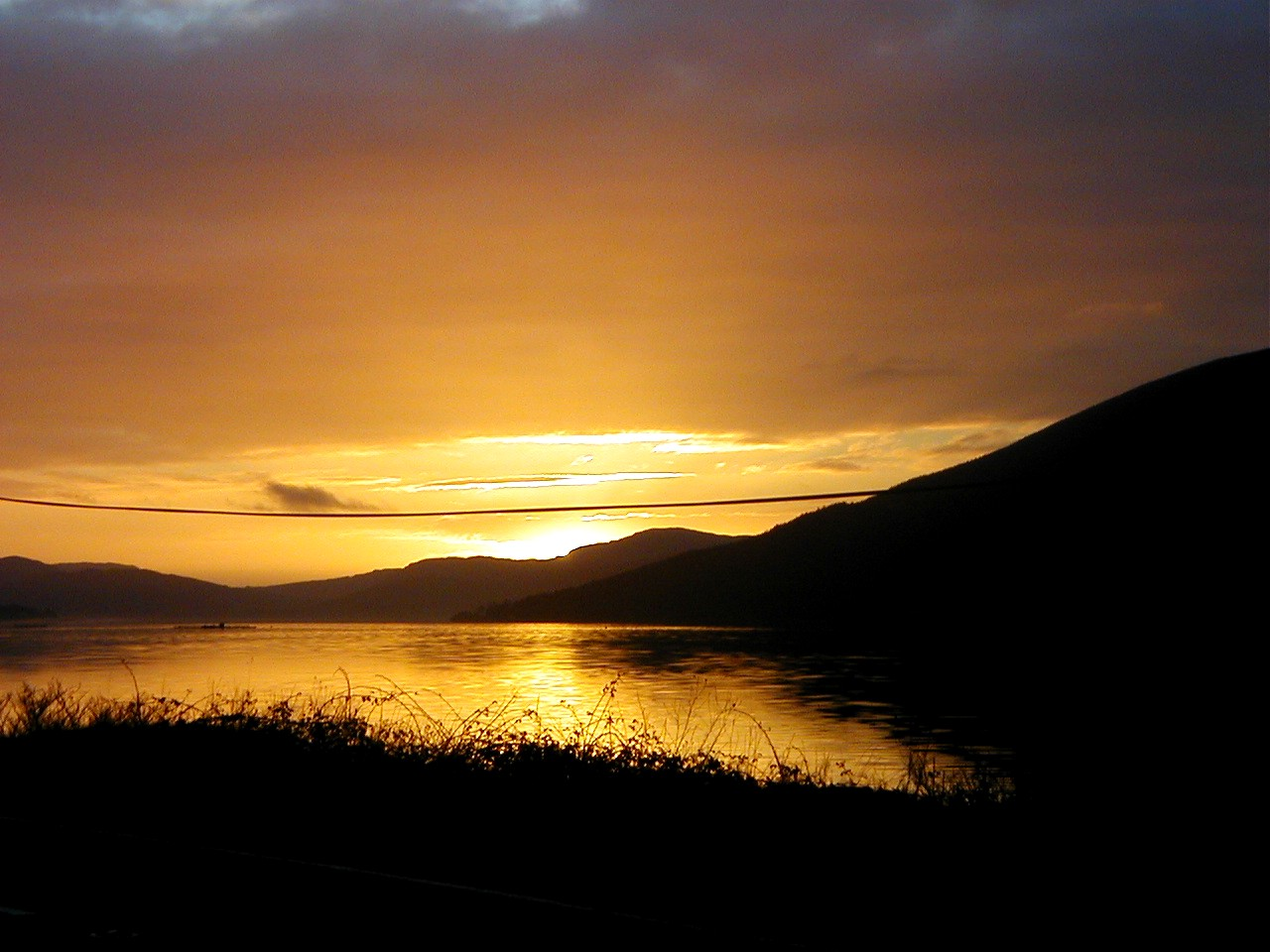
- Sunset on Loch Fyne near Strachur.

- Location within Argyll and Bute
- OS grid reference: NN 09600 01400
- Council area: Argyll and Bute
- Lieutenancy area: Argyll and Bute
- Country: Scotland
- Sovereign state: United Kingdom
- Post town: CAIRNDOW
- Postcode district: PA27
- Dialling code: 01369
- UK Parliament: Argyll, Bute and South Lochaber
- Scottish Parliament: Argyll and Bute

Strachur (Scottish Gaelic: Srath Chura) and Strathlachlan (Scottish Gaelic: Srath Lachlainn) are united parishes in Argyll and Bute, Scotland. Strachur is a small village on the eastern coast of Loch Fyne.

== Geography ==
Cowal is the large peninsula situated between Loch Long to the east and Loch Fyne to the west and bordered to the north by the arterial road A83. Strachur is located 7 miles (11 km) south of the A83, linking Loch Lomond and A82 to Inveraray, Lochgilphead and Campbeltown, and is 18 miles (29 km) north of Dunoon, the main town on the peninsula.

The area around Strachur borders the Loch Lomond and the Trossachs National Park. The parish is bounded along its north-west side by Loch Fyne - Strachur forming its north-western district, and Strathlachlan its south-western one; and it is bounded on other sides by the parishes of Lochgoilhead, Kilmun, Dunoon and Kilmodan. It is mostly uplands, and altitudes rise to 3,000 feet (910 m).

Loch Eck touches the parish for 3 miles (5 km) on the south-east.

Local transport is by bus with a regular service between Dunoon and Inveraray, and Dunoon and Carrick Castle, situated south of Lochgoilhead on Loch Goil. Access to Inveraray used to be via the ferry from St Catherine's just north of Strachur. This ferry closed in the 1960s.

The name 'Strachur' comes from the Gaelic for 'River Valley (srath) of the Cur' - Cur being the name of the river flowing from the hills east of Strachur village, turning south to flow into Loch Eck.

== History ==
The parish church of Strachur dates from 1789 and can accommodate 400. That of Strathlachlan was built in 1792 and can hold 150. The parishes were united in 1950. On a hill overlooking the village, stands the Cailleach Bheur (Scottish Gaelic: The Sharp Old Woman), a stone that is believed to have the power to move from hill top to hill top. The Churches Entrance Porch was built in the late 60's by Stonemason Mr John Magee of Strachur.

== Notable people ==
Glenbranter Mansion House, seat of Sir Harry Lauder

By tradition, Strachur has been held as one of the original strongholds of Clan Campbell, and in 1870 the principal landowners of the parish were Campbell of Strachur and McLachlan of that ilk. The principal country houses there at that time were Strachur Park, Castle Lachlan, Strachurmore, Glenshellis, Balliemore, and Glenbranter. Strachur House was bought by Fitzroy Maclean and is currently the residence of his son, Charles Maclean. The MacLachlan family still reside on the Strathlachlan estate. The walls of Old Castle Lachlan have been restored. Younger members of the MacLachlan clan currently run Inver Cottage, one of Argyll's Seafood Trail restaurants.

Probably the most famous “son of Strachur” was John Campbell of Strachur (1727-1806), although Sir Harry Lauder was the laird of the Glenbranter estate, between Lock Eck and Strachur, in the first half of the twentieth century. There is a memorial to his son Captain John Lauder, of the 8th Battalion Argyll & Sutherland Highlanders, in Glenbranter who died 26 December 1916, during the First World War. Much of the Glenbranter estate was subsequently acquired by the Forestry Commission, who encourage public access to the land. During the 1930s, the Ministry of Labour opened a work camp on the estate for young unemployed men. Known as Instructional Centres, the camp regime sought to "harden" the unemployed, many of whom came from industrial West of Scotland and had previously worked in mining or other industries hit by depression, and prepare them for work elsewhere. The Glenbranter camp hit the headlines in 1935 when the trainees organised public walk-outs, and again in 1936 when there was a mass meeting to protest against conditions.

During World War II, Glenbranter House and grounds were taken over by Combined Operations. It became a landing craft signals school, and was designated as a Royal Navy shore establishment, and named HMS Pasco. The Forestry Commission failed to maintain the mansion house, and it fell into continual decay. Due to the poor condition, Glenbranter House was demolished in the 1960s.

Dr Peter Laird McKinlay retired to Strachur and died there in 1972.

Food writer Lady Veronica Maclean lived in Strachur, running Creggans Inn.

== Sport ==
Strachur is also the name of the local Shinty team. They reached the Camanachd Cup final in 1983, losing to local rivals Kyles Athletic 3–2. They have also won the shinty world cup eight times.

The 2008 UK swamp football championships were held in Strachur in June 2008.

== School ==
Strachur Primary School is a small school averaging 60 pupils, it has three classrooms and a fair sized playground. The school does work for the community such as: beach cleans at Loch Fyne, litter pick ups around the village, and various work with the Loch Lomond Park Rangers and GRAB Trust.

== Amenities ==
Strachur has a post office, the two churches of Strachur and Strathlachlan, the Creggans Inn, and a bar, the Clachan. The village Memorial and New halls host events local and for the whole of Cowal and beyond.

The local smiddy, which closed as a blacksmiths in the 1950s after over 150 years and four generations of the Montgomery family of smiths, is now the Smiddy Museum, open from Easter to 30 September.

Strachur has its own post office though as of 2013 it is open three days a week but is under threat of closure.

Strachur Medical Practice covers a massive geographical area reaching from Cairndow to Strathlachlan. As of 2012, the GP claimed his practice was close to bankruptcy because of NHS funding changes.

== Gallery ==
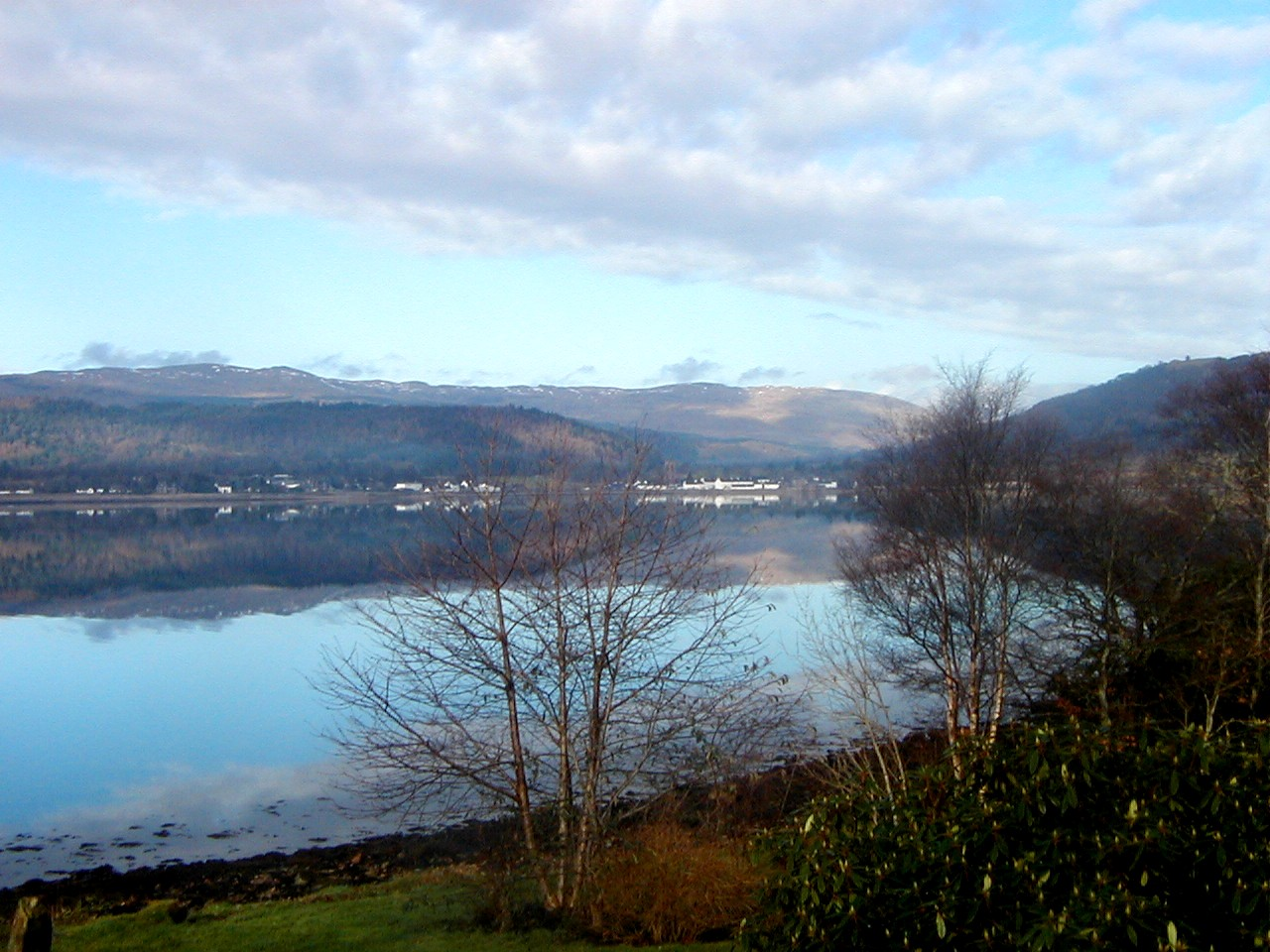
Loch Fyne near Strachur, looking toward Inveraray.

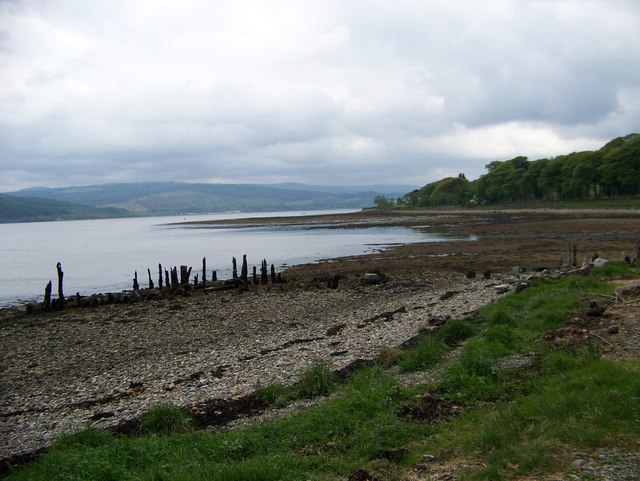
The remains of the pier at Strachur Bay.

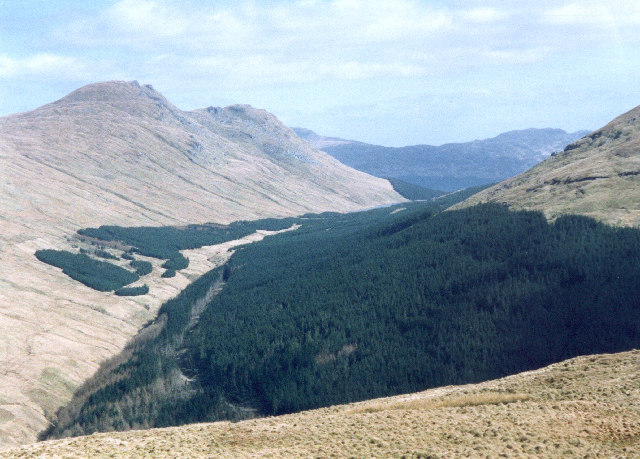
On the north ridge of Beinn Lagan. looking east to Beinn Lochain along what is now the route of the Cowal way.

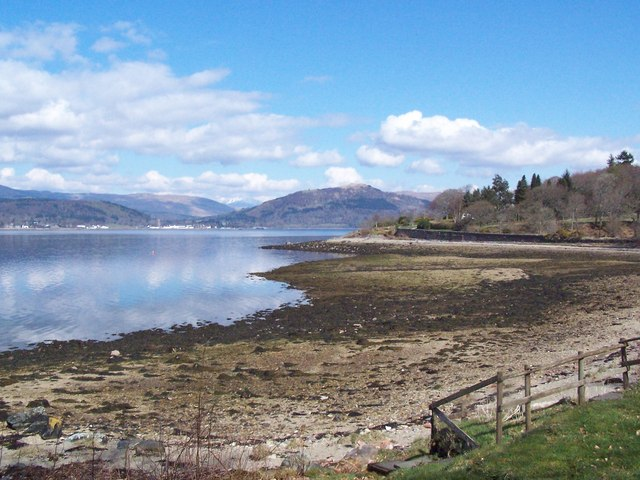
Strachur - St, Catherines, Creag a' Phuill shoreline Taken from the old Road with Inveraray in the background.

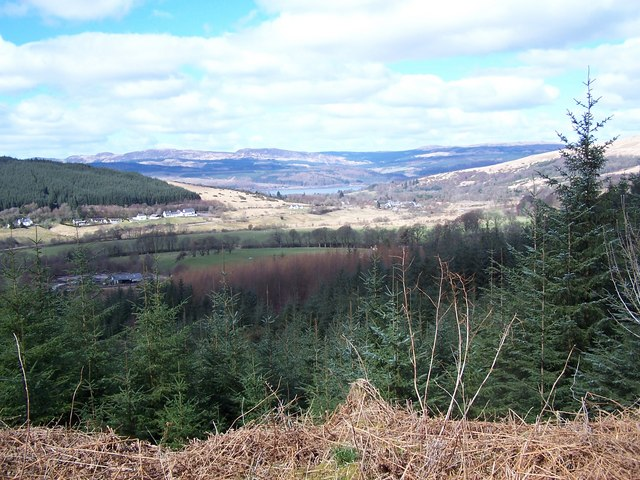
View of Strachur. Taken from hill Beinn Lagen Road leading to Strachurmore.

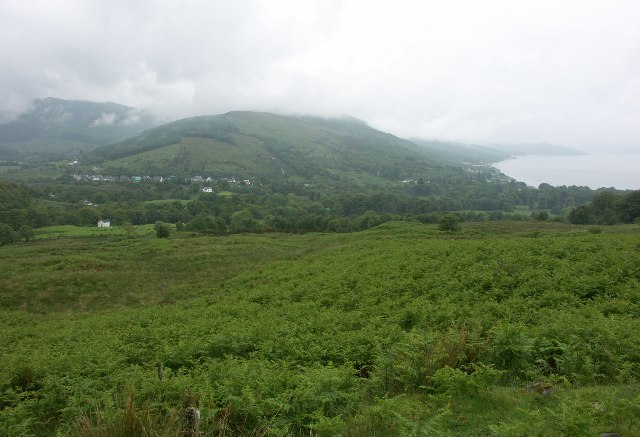
View over Strachur village.

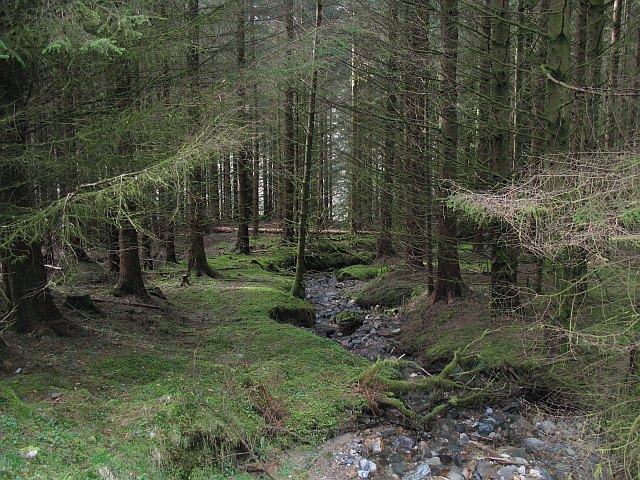
A burn, Strachur From the bad old days when conifer forests were planted right up to watercourses.

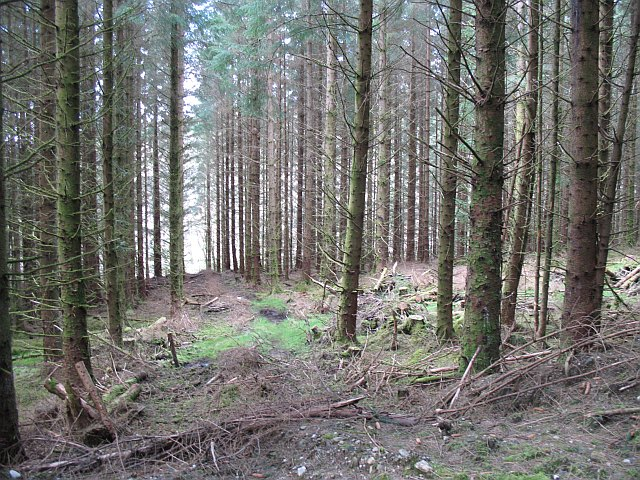
Extraction lane, Strachur Thinned spruce forest above the River Cur.
