= Eastern Approaches =

Memoir of the early career of Fitzroy Maclean

- Front Book Cover
- Author: Fitzroy Maclean
- Language: English
- Subject: World War II, Travel literature
- Genre: Autobiography
- Publication date: 1949
- Publication place: United Kingdom
- Media type: Paperback
- Pages: 550
- OCLC: 6486798

Eastern Approaches (1949) is a memoir of the early career of Fitzroy Maclean. It is divided into three parts: his life as a junior diplomat in Moscow and his travels in the Soviet Union, especially the forbidden zones of Central Asia; his exploits in the British Army and SAS in the North Africa theatre of war; and his time with Josip Broz Tito and the Partisans in Yugoslavia.

Maclean was considered to be one of Ian Fleming's inspirations for James Bond, and this book contains many of the elements: remote travel, the sybaritic delights of diplomatic life, violence and adventure. The American edition was titled Escape To Adventure, and was published a year later. All place names in this article use the spelling in the book.

== Golden Road: the Soviet Union ==
Fresh out of Cambridge, Maclean joined the Foreign Office and spent a couple of years at the Paris embassy. He loved the pleasures of life in the French capital, but eventually longed for adventure. Against the advice of his friends (and to the delight of his London bosses), he requested a posting to Moscow, which he received right away; once there, he began to learn Russian. Travelling within the Soviet Union was frowned upon by the authorities, but Maclean managed to take several trips anyway.

=== The Caucasus ===
In the spring of 1937, he took a trial trip, heading south from Moscow to Baku on the Caspian Sea. The Intourist official tried to dissuade him, but he found a ship to take him to Lenkoran (Lankaran, Azerbaijan), where he witnessed the deportation of several hundred Turko-Tartar peasants to Central Asia. Stuck there for a few days, he bargained for horses with which to explore the countryside, and was arrested by the NKVD cavalry near to the Persian border. He explained that he held diplomatic immunity, but his captors could not read his Soviet diplomatic pass. Eventually, as the only person literate in Russian, Maclean "read out, with considerable expression, and such improvements as occurred to me" the contents of his pass, and was set free. He took an 1856 paddle steamer back to Baku, and then a train on to Tiflis (Tbilisi, Georgia). British troops had supported the Democratic Republic after World War I, and Maclean sought out the British war cemetery, in the process discovering an English governess who had lived in the town since 1912. He caught a truck through the Caucasus Mountains, via Mtzkhet (Mtskheta), the former capital of Georgia but by then merely a village, to Vladikavkaz (capital of North Ossetia), and then a train to Moscow.

=== To Samarkand ===
His second trip, in the autumn of the same year, took him east along the Trans-Siberian Railway. Although he disembarked without warning at Novosibirsk, he acquired an NKVD escort. He travelled on the Turksib Railway south to Biisk (Biysk), at the foot of the Altai Mountains, and then to Altaisk and Barnaul. On the trains he heard the complaints of the Siberian kolkhozniks (workers on collective farms) and witnessed another mass movement, this time of Koreans to Central Asia. His first main destination was Alma Ata (Almaty), the capital of the Kazakh republic, which lies near to the Tien Shan Mountains. He characterised it as "one of the pleasantest provincial towns in the Soviet Union" and particularly appreciated the apples for which it is famous. From there he took a truck to a hill village called Talgar and went walking with one of his NKVD escorts; Maclean availed himself of peasant hospitality and commented on the general prosperity. He managed to hire a car and made it to Issyk-kul, the lake that never freezes, but had to turn back because of the season. From Alma Ata Maclean took the train for Tashkent, passing through villages where "nothing seemed to have changed since the time when the country was ruled over by the Emir of Bokhara"; men still rode bulls and women still wore veils made of black horsehair. From Tashkent, which then had a reputation for wickedness, he made the final leg to the fabled city of Samarkand. He returned to Moscow with plans for a further trip.

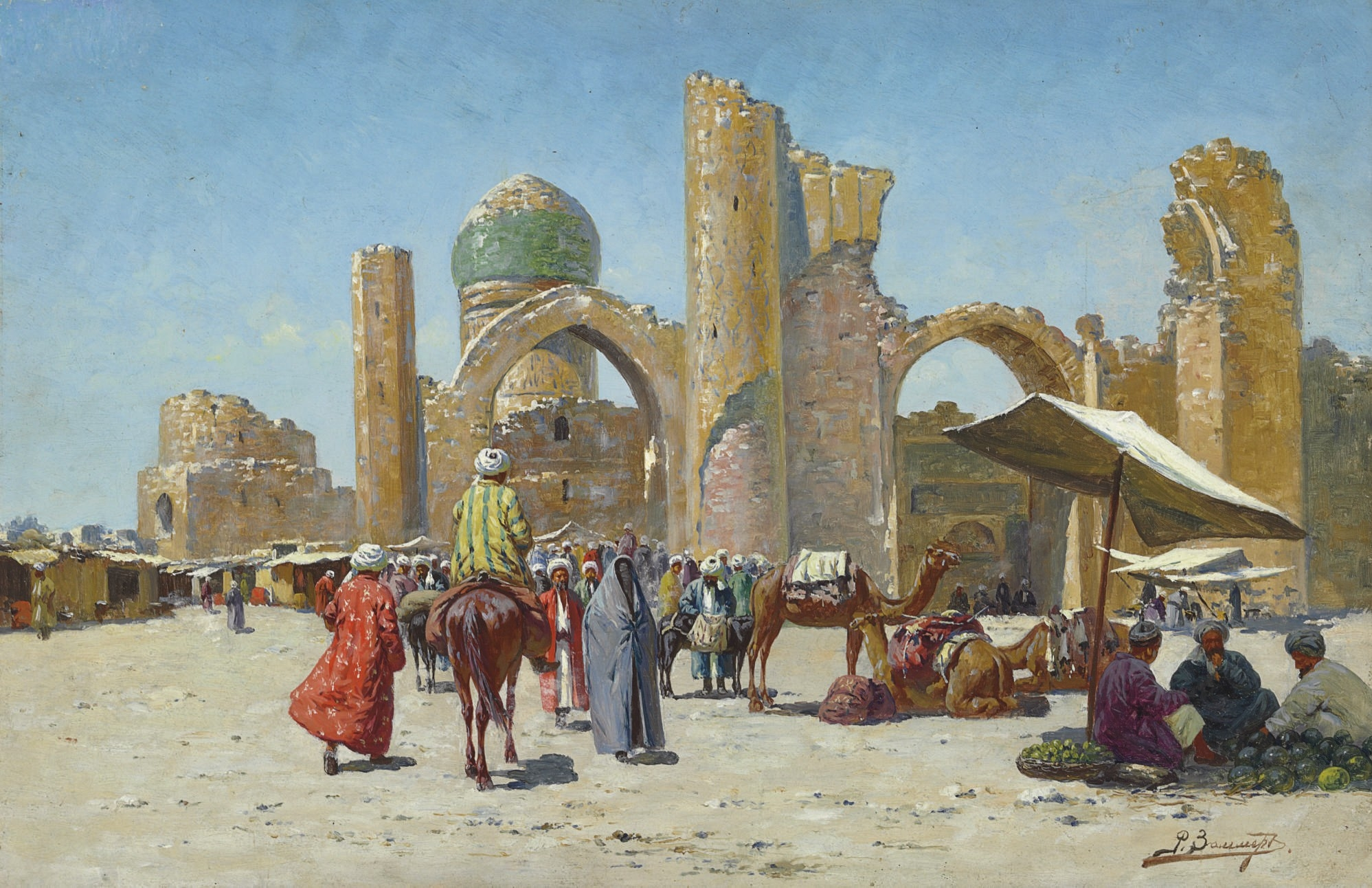
Samarkand, by Richard-Karl Karlovitch Zommer

Maclean spent the winter working in Moscow and amusing himself at the dacha (country cottage) of American friends, including Chip Bohlen. In March 1938 a show trial was announced, the first such public event in over a year; he attended every day of what became known as the Trial of the Twenty-One. The book goes into great detail, spending 40 pages on description and analysis of the trial, its prominent figures and its twists and turns.

=== To Chinese Turkestan ===
When the weather became more conducive to travel, Maclean began his third and longest trip, aiming for Chinese Turkestan, immediately east of the Soviet Central Asian republics he had reached in 1937. This journey, unlike the previous two, was at the request of the British government. They wished him to investigate the conditions in Urumchi (Ürümqi), the capital of the province of Sinkiang (Xinjiang), which had fallen under Soviet influence. He was commissioned to talk to the tupan (provincial governor) there about the situation of both the consul-general and the British Indian traders. The first stage was retracing his steps on a five-day train journey to Alma Ata; the train ran via Orenburg and the Aral Sea, then parallel to the Syr Darya and the mountains of Kirghizia (Kyrgyzstan). From Alma Aty he travelled four hundred miles north through the Hungry Steppe to Ayaguz (Ayagoz), where "a road which had been made, and was being kept up, for a very definite purpose" led to the frontier town of Bakhti (Bakhty or Bakhtu, about 17 km from Tacheng, known in Maclean's time as Chuguchak). The Soviet officials were, at first, willing to assist him but the Chinese ones were not, and in the course of the negotiations that surrounded his passage, Maclean discovered that the Soviets exercised some influence over at least the consul if not the provincial government of their neighbours. He crossed the border into China, where he was refused permission to continue; he was forced to return to Alma Aty, whence he was expelled. Soon he found himself back in Moscow.

=== To Bokhara and Kabul ===
His fourth and final Soviet trip was once more to Central Asia, spurred by the desire to reach Bokhara (Bukhara, Uzbekistan), the capital of the emirate which had been closed to Europeans until recent times. Maclean recounts how Charles Stoddart and Arthur Conolly were executed there in the context of The Great Game, and how Joseph Wolff, known as the Eccentric Missionary, barely escaped their fate when he came looking for them in 1845. In early October 1938 Maclean set out again, first for Ashkhabad (Ashgabat, capital of the Turkmen Soviet Socialist Republic), then through the Kara Kum (Black Desert), not breaking his journey at either Tashkent or Samarkand, but pushing on to Kagan, the nearest point on the railway to Bokhara. After trying to smuggle himself aboard a lorry transporting cotton, he ended up walking to the city, and spent several days sight-seeing "in the steps of the Eccentric Missionary" and sleeping in parks, much to the frustration of the NKVD spies who were shadowing him. He judged it an "enchanted city", with buildings that rivalled "the finest architecture of the Italian Renaissance". Aware of his limited time, he cut short his wanderings and took the train towards Stalinabad (Dushanbe, the capital of Tajikistan), disembarking at Termez. This town sits on the Amu Darya (the Oxus), and the other side of the river lies in Afghanistan. Maclean claimed that "very few Europeans except Soviet frontier guards have ever seen it at this or any other point of its course". After more negotiations, he managed to cross the river and thus leave the USSR, and from that point his only guide seems to have been the narrative of "the Russian Burnaby", a colonel Nikolai Ivanovich Grodekov, who rode from Samarkand to Mazar-i-Sharif and Herat in 1878. The following day he and a guide set out on horseback, riding through jungle and desert, and detained on the way by dubious characters who may or may not have been brigands. (Maclean, a proficient linguist, was hamstrung on entering Afghanistan by the lack of any lingua franca.) They rode past the ruins of Balkh, a civilization founded by Alexander the Great and destroyed by Genghis Khan. After a night in Mazar, Maclean managed to get a car and driver, and progressed as rapidly as he could to Doaba, a village half-way to Kabul, where he had arranged to meet the British minister (i.e., ambassador), Colonel Frazer-Tytler. Together, they returned to the capital via Bamyan and its famous statues. Maclean circled back to Moscow via Peshawar, Delhi, Baghdad, Persia, and Armenia.

== Orient Sand: the Western Desert Campaign ==
The middle section of the book details Maclean's first set of experiences in World War II. He was invited to join the newly formed Special Air Service (SAS), where, as part of the Western Desert Campaign, he planned and executed raids on Axis-held Benghazi, on the coast of Libya (Operation Bigamy). When it became clear that the North African Campaign was drawing to a close towards the end of 1942 and it became too quiet for his taste, he travelled east to arrest General Fazlollah Zahedi, at the time the head of the Persian armed forces in the south.

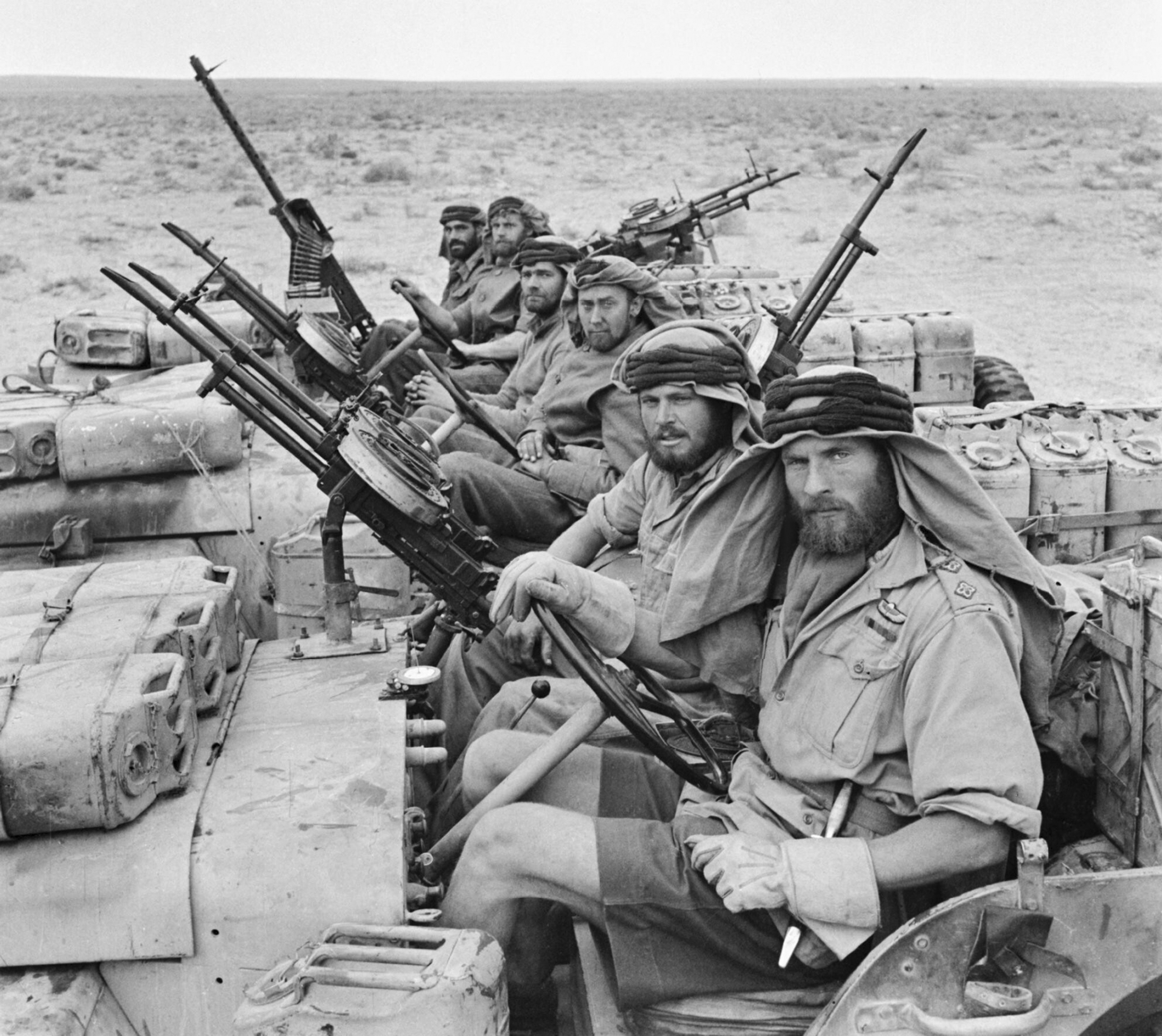
SAS patrol in North Africa during WW2.

=== Joining up ===
The first challenge Maclean faced was getting into military service at all. His Foreign Office job was a reserved occupation, so he was not allowed to enlist. The only way around this was to go into politics, and on this stated ground Maclean tendered his resignation in 1941 to Alexander Cadogan, an FO mandarin. Maclean immediately enlisted, taking a taxi from Sir Alexander's office to a nearby recruiting station, where he joined the Cameron Highlanders, his father's regiment, as a private. Later, his erstwhile employers discovered that his resignation had been merely a ruse or legal fiction along the lines of taking the Chiltern Hundreds. Maclean was thus forced to run for office and, despite his self-confessed inexperience, was chosen as a Conservative candidate, and eventually elected MP. Prime Minister Winston Churchill jocularly accused him of using "the Mother of Parliaments as a public convenience".

=== Benghazi and the desert retreat ===
After basic training, Maclean was sent to Cairo, where David Stirling invited him to join the newly formed Special Air Service (SAS), which he did. They worked closely with the Long Range Desert Group (LRDG), a mechanised reconnaissance unit, to travel far behind enemy lines and attack targets such as aerodromes. Maclean's first operation with the SAS, once his training was completed, was to Benghazi, Libya's second largest city, in late May 1942. He was joined on this operation by Randolph Churchill, son of the prime minister. They drove from Alexandria via the seaport of Mersa Matruh and the inland Siwa Oasis. They crossed the ancient caravan route known as the Trigh-el-Abd, which the enemy had laced with little bombs, and camped in the Gebel Akhdar, the Green Mountain just inland from the coastal plain. Once inside the occupied city, their patrol came face to face with Italian soldiers several times; Maclean, with his excellent Italian, managed to bluff his way out of all of these encounters by pretending to be a staff officer. They spent two nights and a day in the city. They had hoped to sabotage ships, but both the rubber boats they had brought with them failed to inflate, so they treated the visit as a reconnaissance mission. The drive back was uneventful, but nearing Cairo, Maclean, along with most of his party, was seriously injured in a crash and spent months out of action.

Once he had recovered, Stirling involved him in preparations for a larger SAS attack on Benghazi. They attended a dinner with Churchill, the Chief of the Imperial General Staff General Alan Brooke, and General Harold Alexander, who was about to assume control of Middle East Command, the post responsible for the overall conduct of the campaign in the North African desert. Four operations were designed to create a diversion from Rommel's attempt on El Alamein: attacks on Benghazi (Operation Bigamy), Tobruk, Barce, and the Jalo oasis. These all started out from Kufra, an oasis 800 miles inland. Maclean's convoy drove to the Gebel across the Sand Sea at its narrowest point, Zighen, and made it there undetected, although "bazaar gossip" from an Arab spy indicated that the enemy expected an imminent attack. When Maclean's group reached the outskirts of Benghazi, they were ambushed and had to retreat. Axis planes repeatedly bombed them, destroying many of the vehicles and most of their supplies. Thus began a painful limp of days and nights over the desert towards Jalo, without even knowing whether that oasis was in Allied hands. They existed on rations of "a cup of water and a tablespoon of bully beef a day.... We found ourselves looking forward to the evening meal with painful fixity". When they got to that oasis, they found a battle going on between the Italian defenders and the Sudan Defence Force, and despite their offers to help, they received orders from GHQ to abandon the assault. Some days later they made it back to Kufra.

=== The arrest of the Persian general ===
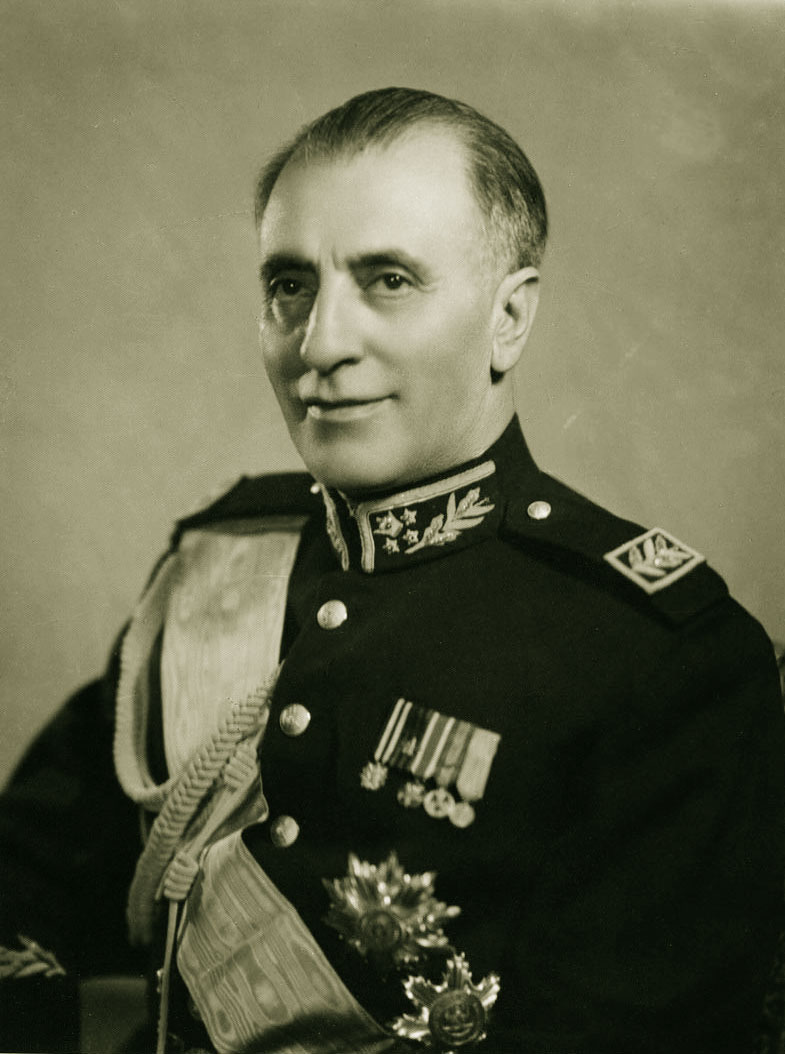
Fazlollah Zahedi

In September 1942 Maclean was ordered to Baghdad, where General Wilson, the new head of Persia and Iraq Command, wanted his advice about starting something like the SAS in Persia, should that country fall to the Germans. He proceeded there to recruit volunteers, passing through many of the places he had seen in peacetime four years earlier: Kermanshah, Hamadan, Kazvin, Teheran. He was soon diverted to a more urgent task. General Joseph Baillon, the Chief of Staff, and Reader Bullard, the minister (i.e., ambassador, as above), summoned him to Teheran. They were concerned about the influence of Fazlollah Zahedi, the general in charge of the Persian forces in the Isfahan area, who, their intelligence told them, was stockpiling grain, liaising with German agents, and preparing an uprising. Baillon and Bullard asked Maclean to remove Zahidi alive and without creating a fuss. He devised a Trojan horse plan: he and a senior officer would call on Zahidi to pay their respects, and then arrest him "at the point of a pistol" within his walled and guarded residence. He would be whisked out in the British staff car, driven a waiting plane, and flown into internment and exile. Maclean obtained and trained a platoon of Seaforth Highlanders to cover his retreat, and the plan went like clockwork. (Zahidi spent the rest of the war in British Palestine; five years later he was back in charge of the military of southern Persia, by 1953 he was prime minister.)

By the end of the year, the war had developed in such a way that the new SAS detachment would not be needed in Persia. General Wilson was being transferred to Middle East Command, and Maclean extracted a promise that the newly trained troops would go with him, as their style of commando raids were ideal for southern and eastern Europe. Frustrated by the abandoning of plans for an assault on Crete, Maclean went to see Reginald Leeper, "an old friend from Foreign Office days, and now His Majesty's Ambassador to the Greek Government then in exile in Cairo". Leeper put in a word for him, and very soon Maclean was told to go to London to get his instructions directly from the prime minister. Churchill told him to parachute into Jugoslavia (now spelled Yugoslavia) as head of a military mission accredited to Josip Broz Tito (a shadowy figure at that point) or whoever was in charge of the Partisans, the Communist-led resistance movement. Mihajlovic's royalist Cetniks (now spelled Chetniks), which the Allies had been supporting, did not appear to be fighting the Germans very hard, and indeed were said to be collaborating with the enemy. Maclean famously paraphrased Churchill: "My task was simply to help find out who was killing the most Germans and suggest means by which we could help them to kill more." The prime minister saw Maclean as "a daring Ambassador-leader to these hardy and hunted guerillas".

== Balkan War: With Tito in Yugoslavia ==
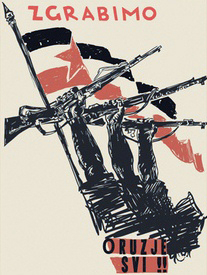
"To arms, everyone!", a Partisan propaganda poster.

The final and longest section of the book covers Maclean's time in and around Yugoslavia, from the late summer of 1943 to the formation of the united government in March 1945. The Yugoslav front, also known as the Yugoslav People's Liberation War, had become important to the Allies by 1943, although the Partisans had been fighting for two years without any help. He lived closely with Tito and his troops and had the ear of Churchill, and as such his recommendations shaped the Allies' policy towards Yugoslavia.

=== The list of characters ===
In the late summer of 1943, Maclean parachuted into Bosnia with Vivian Street and Slim Farish (whom he called his British and American Chiefs of Staff, respectively) and Sergeant Duncan, his bodyguard. They were attached to Tito's headquarters, then in the ruined castle of Jajce. Here and elsewhere, Maclean lived in proximity to the Partisan leader for a year and a half, on and off. Maclean gives much of this section of the book to his personal assessment of the Partisan position and of Tito as a man and as a leader. Their talks, in German and Russian (while Maclean learned Serbo-Croat), were wide-ranging, and from them Maclean gained hope that a future Communist Yugoslavia might not be the fear-wracked place the USSR was. The Partisans were extremely proud of their movement, dedicated to it, and prepared to live a life of austerity in its cause. All of this won his admiration.

Some of the characters close to Tito whom Maclean met in his first months in Bosnia were Vlatko Velebit, an urbane young man about town, who later went with Maclean to Allied HQ as a liaison officer; Father Vlado (Vlada Zečević), a Serbian Orthodox priest, "raconteur and trencherman"; Arso Jovanović, the chief of staff; Edo Kardelj, the Marxist theoretician who ended up vice-premier; Aleksandar Ranković, a professional revolutionary and Party organiser; Milovan Đilas (Dzilas), who became vice-president; Moša Pijade, one of the highest-ranking Jews; and a young woman named Olga whose father Momčilo Ninčić had been a minister in the Royalist government and who spoke English like a debutante.

Other Yugoslavs of note whom he met later included Koča Popović, later Chief of the General Staff of Yugoslav People's Army, whom Maclean judged "one of the outstanding figures of the Partisan Movement"; Ivo Lola Ribar, son of Dr Ivan Ribar, who seemed destined for great things; Miloje Milojević; Slavko Rodić; Sreten Žujović (Crni the Black).

Officers and soldiers under Maclean's command included Peter Moore of the Royal Engineers; Mike Parker, Deputy Assistant Quartermaster general; Gordon Alston; John Henniker-Major, a career diplomat; Donald Knight, and Robin Whetherly.

Maclean arranged for an Allied officer, under his command, to be attached to each of the main Partisan bases, bringing with him a radio transmitting set. Maclean was not in fact the first Allied officer in Yugoslavia, but the few who had been dropped before him had not been able to get much of their information out. Maclean made contact with Bill Deakin, an Oxford history don who had served as a research assistant to Churchill; Anthony Hunter, a Scots Fusilier, and Major William Jones, an enthusiastic but unorthodox one-eyed Canadian.

=== First journey across Bosnia and Dalmatia ===
Maclean saw his task as arranging supplies and air support for the Partisan fight, to tie up the Axis forces for as long as possible. The Royal Air Force was reluctant to risk landing on what they saw as an amateur airstrip at Glamoj (Glamoč), although Slim Farish was in fact an airfield designer, and night air drops were sporadic. The Royal Navy was approached, and they offered to bring supplies to an outlying island off the Dalmatian coast. Maclean and a couple of companions set off on foot for Korčula, being passed from guerilla group to guerilla group. They passed through battle-scarred villages and towns that had changed hands many times, some so recently that corpses still lay on the ground: Bugojno and Livno and Aržano. Once, they were billeted with a landlady whose sympathies clearly did not lie with the Partisans; she would not sell them food, but there was no question of simply commandeering it. Eventually, after an all-night march across noisy stony ground, dodging German patrols as they crossed a major road, the little group reached Zadvarje, where they were greeted with astonishment as creatures from another world "as indeed in a sense we were". After a few hours' sleep, they continued over the final range of hills to the coast, and down to Baška Voda, where a fishing boat took them circuitously to Korčula. There, all seemed in order for a Navy supply drop, but the wireless set developed problems. Maclean was on the point of returning to Jajce when the motor launch arrived, with a crew that included Sandy Glen (also, like Maclean, thought to be one of the inspirations for James Bond) and David Satow. By this point the enemy were closing in to take the remaining access points to the coast, which would throttle the Partisan supply route before it had even begun. He sent top priority requests, asking for air and sea support from Allied bases in Italy, and these took effect. Maclean decided he needed to discuss matters with Tito and then with Allied superiors in Cairo to argue for more resources to push the project forward, and accordingly made his way back to Partisan HQ in Jajce. He returned to the islands, first on Hvar and then on Vis, to wait for the response to his strongly worded signals. On Vis he discovered an overgrown British war cemetery dating from a naval victory over the French in 1811.

=== Gaining support ===
In Cairo Maclean dined with Alexander Cadogan, his FO superior, and the next day reported to Anthony Eden, the Foreign Secretary. He stated his conclusions straightforwardly: that the Partisans were important militarily and politically and would influence the future of Yugoslavia whether the Allies helped them or not; their impact on the Germans could be greatly increased by Allied support; they were Communist and oriented towards the USSR. He says that his report created "something of a stir". He was sent back to collect two Yugoslav liaison officers who had not been allowed to come out with him on the first Navy pick-up. From Bari on the Italian Adriatic coast, now a centre of operations for the Tactical Air Force, he saw that this would prove difficult, as the German offensive had captured the whole Dalmatian coast. Fortunately, he had asked Air Marshal Sholto Douglas to assign him a liaison officer, and Wing Commander John B. Selby proved a godsend. Together they obtained the use of a Baltimore bomber and an escort of Lightnings. Twice they set out from Italy on a sunny day and twice the clouds blocked them from the Bosnian hills. On the third day the fighters were unavailable so the bomber set out alone, but again the weather made it impossible to land. On their return to Italy, they received a signal that the Partisans had captured a small German plane that they proposed to use. As they were loading up the plane, an enemy aircraft, alerted by a traitor, bombed the landing strip at Glamoc, killing Whetherly, Knight, and Ribar, and wounding Milojevic. This event, at the end of November, proved a spur to getting the mission higher priority, and soon Maclean got a large Dakota and half a squadron of Lightnings to complete the landing operation. Milojevic and Velebit accompanied Maclean to Alexandria, where the Yugoslavs decompressed for a few days, while Maclean sought out the prime minister.

Churchill received him in trademark fashion: in bed, wearing an embroidered dressing gown, smoking a cigar. He, Joseph Stalin, and Franklin D. Roosevelt had discussed the matter of Yugoslavia at a recent conference in Teheran, and had decided to give all possible support to the Partisans. This was the turning point. The Chetniks were given a task (a bridge to blow up) and a deadline, to show whether they could still be effective allies; they failed this test and supplies were re-directed from them to the Partisans. The British government was left with the tricky political and moral problem of King Peter and his royalist government in exile. But the main issues were air supplies and air support, and to help co-ordinate this, Maclean's mission was expanded. Some of the new officers included Andrew Maxwell of the Scots Guards, John Clarke of the 2nd Scots Guards, Geoffrey Kup, a gunnery expert, Hilary King, a signals officer, Johnny Tregida, and, for a time, Randolph Churchill. Some of these were SAS or otherwise known from the Western Desert Campaign the previous year.

=== Marshal of Yugoslavia ===
Maclean returned to the islands and settled on Vis as being the best site for an airstrip and a naval base. He then needed to garrison it. He discussed the matter with General Alexander and his Chief of Staff General John Harding, who seemed to think it might be possible, and who gave him a lift to Marrakesh to put the matter to the prime minister. Churchill assured him on the point of troops, and wrote a personal letter to Tito which he commissioned Maclean to deliver. Maclean parachuted into Bosnia again, thinking it no longer an unknown, as it had been only six months before. Tito, since the end of November Marshal of Yugoslavia, was delighted with the recognition from Churchill, as from one statesman to another.

The Partisan headquarters moved to the village of Drvar, where Tito took up residence in a cave with a waterfall. Maclean spent months there with him, "talking, eating, and above all, arguing". He and Tito agreed a system of allocating the air drop supplies around the country, although there was some friction from officers wanting a bigger share. Air drops became much more frequent, as did air support for Partisan operations. At this point all support for the Cetniks was withdrawn, a fact Churchill announced in the House of Commons. Maclean decided to go to Serbia to see for himself what this stronghold of Cetniks held for the Partisans. In early April, before this could be arranged, he was ordered to London for further discussions. (A stop-over in Algiers meant a specially arranged radio phone call with Churchill. Maclean, who hated telephone conversations, managed to wring amusement from the mix-ups of codes and scrambling. Churchill's son was referred to as Pippin.)

They arrived in England to find "the whole of the southern counties [were] one immense armed camp". Despite the tension over the anticipated invasion of Normandy, the press and officials were eager to hear the Yugoslav story, and Maclean and Velebit had a busy time; even U.S. General Dwight D. Eisenhower wanted to meet them. At Chequers Maclean participated in attempts to build a possible compromise between the Royalist government in exile and the Partisans. As Maclean was preparing to go back to Bari and Bosnia, he received news that the enemy had made a fierce attack on Partisan headquarters at Drvar, later known as the Knight's Move. "It was the kind of communication that took your breath away." When he got the full story from Vivian Street, he heard how the German bombers had made a full and thorough attack, and, after Tito and the Partisans escaped, revenged themselves on the civilians, massacring almost everyone, men, women, and children. In the week that followed the attack on Drvar, Allied planes flew more than a thousand sorties in support of the Partisans. Tito, harassed and harried through the woods, reached the decision that he needed to leave and establish his headquarters in a place of security. Accordingly, he asked Vivian Street to arrange for the Allies to evacuate him and his staff, which they did. Maclean, on his way back from London, caught up with the Marshal at Bari, and found him proposing to establish his base on Vis. The Royal Navy took him across in fine style, with a memorable wardroom dinner, at which Tito recited, in English, "The Owl and the Pussycat".

=== Negotiating the future of Yugoslavia ===
Vis had been transformed in the intervening months, becoming a substantial base for aircraft, commandos, and navy boats "engaged in piratical activities against enemy shipping up and down the whole length of the Jugoslav coastline from Istria to Montenegro". Meanwhile, other fronts of the war were progressing rapidly, and the Germans were hard-pressed. It was necessary to discuss the future shape of Yugoslavia at the highest possible level, and so Maclean was instructed to invite Tito and his entourage to Caserta, the Allied Force Headquarters near Naples. Maclean accompanied him on this, his first public appearance outside his own country. While the negotiations wore on, Maclean was told that Churchill would be in Italy in a week and wanted to see the Yugoslav Marshal, but security meant the prime minister's movements could not be released. Maclean helped to spin out Tito's visit with side trips and excuses, taking him to Rome and Cassino, "to tea with Hermione Ranfurly at her ridiculous little house of the side of the hill overlooking the Bay of Naples" and to Capri to meet Mrs Harrison Williams. Sitting outside one afternoon, Tito saw a heavy plane and a dozen fighters coming in, and announced that that must be Mr Churchill. Maclean commented wryly, "He was not an easy man to keep anything from".

The negotiations that followed were called the Naples Conference, with Tito, Velebit and Olga on one side of the table and Churchill and Maclean on the other. Churchill was happy to give this matter his personal attention, and, Maclean says, he did it very well. One day the two leaders were taking a rest, having handed things over to a committee of experts, when a matter arose required Churchill's immediate attention. Maclean was sent to find him; he was believed to be bathing in the Bay of Naples. When they got to the shore, they saw the huge flotilla of troopships setting off for the south of France (Operation Dragoon), and a small bright blue admiral's barge dodging around them. Maclean was assigned a little torpedo boat, complete with a cautious captain and an attractive stenographer. It zoomed after the barge, eventually catching up with the prime minister, who found Maclean and his crew's arrival a source of much hilarity.

Immediately after the Naples Conference, Tito continued the diplomatic discussions on Vis, this time with Ivan Šubašić, prime minister of the Royal Yugoslav Government, and his colleagues. Ralph Stevenson, the British Ambassador to this government in exile, accompanied Šubašić to Vis, but he and Maclean stayed out of the negotiations and spent their days swimming and speculating. The two parties came to an agreement, the Treaty of Vis, which, Maclean said, "sounded (and was) too good to be true". To celebrate this, Tito took everyone out in a motor boat to a local beauty spot, an underwater cave illuminated with sunlight (Biševo). "We all stripped and bathed, our bodies glistening bluish and ghastly. Almost everyone there was a Cabinet Minister in one or other of the two Yugoslav Governments, and there was much shouting and laughter as one blue and phosphorescent Excellency cannoned into another, bobbing about in that cerulean twilight."

=== Planning for action ===
But by this point Maclean had had enough of high politics and garrison life. He wanted to be back in the action, and it looked as if the Germans were planning to withdraw from Yugoslavia. Accordingly, he came up with a plan known as Operation Ratweek, in which the Partisans and Allies were to harass the Axis troops in close co-ordination for seven days, destroying their communication lines. Bill Elliot, in command of the Balkan Air Force, supported the plan, as did the Navy and General Wilson. Tito committed himself too, although, as Maclean points out, it would have been understandable had he wished to let the Germans leave as soon as possible. Maclean got permission from Churchill to go to Serbia, previously a stronghold of the Chetniks, to supervise Ratweek from there.

He landed at Bojnik near Radan Mountain, a position surrounded by Bulgars, Albanians, White Russians, and Germans. Through the latter part of August he, and his team back in Bari and Caserta, and the Partisans in Serbia and elsewhere, finalised the details of Ratweek. Almost to cue, the White Russians blew up their ammunition dump and the enemy started to retreat. The following day, Maclean moved to near Leskovac, and the next day, Ratweek began, with fifty heavy bombers attacking the town at 11:30. "Already the Fortresses were over their target -- were past it -- when, as we watched, the whole of Leskovac seemed to rise bodily into the air in a tornado of dust and smoke and debris, and a great rending noise fell on our ears. When we looked at the sky again, the Forts, still relentlessly following their course, were mere silvery dots in the distance. [...] Even the Partisans seemed subdued." That night, the land offensive began, and Maclean watched the Partisans attack the Belgrade-Salonika railway, blowing up bridges, burning sleepers, and rendering it unusable. When the Germans tried to repair it, the Balkan Air Force soon dissuaded them. They tried to evacuate Greece and Macedonia by air, but again the Allies thwarted them. Maclean, with three British companions and one Yugoslav guide, made his way on horseback north into Serbia. They travelled for several days through prosperous countryside, "so surprising after Bosnia and Dalmatia", where the peasants, who expressed great friendship for Britain and a certain caution about the Partisans, gave them lavish hospitality and food. One evening they camped outside a village, and soon saw "a procession of peasant women arriving with an array of bowls, baskets, jars and bottles. From these they produced eggs and sour milk and fresh bread and a couple of chickens and a roast suckling-pig and cream cheese and pastry and wine and peaches and grapes". The journey produced many such vignettes, some pleasant, others of confusion, discomfort, worry. Altogether Maclean found it "an agreeable existence", reflecting "with heightened distaste" on the life he lived on Vis in the shadow of political negotiations. He hoped he could remain in Serbia to be there when Belgrade was liberated, but received a message that Tito had disappeared—or as Churchill put it "levanted"—and he had to try to find him. A plane was sent to pick up Maclean.

=== End stages ===
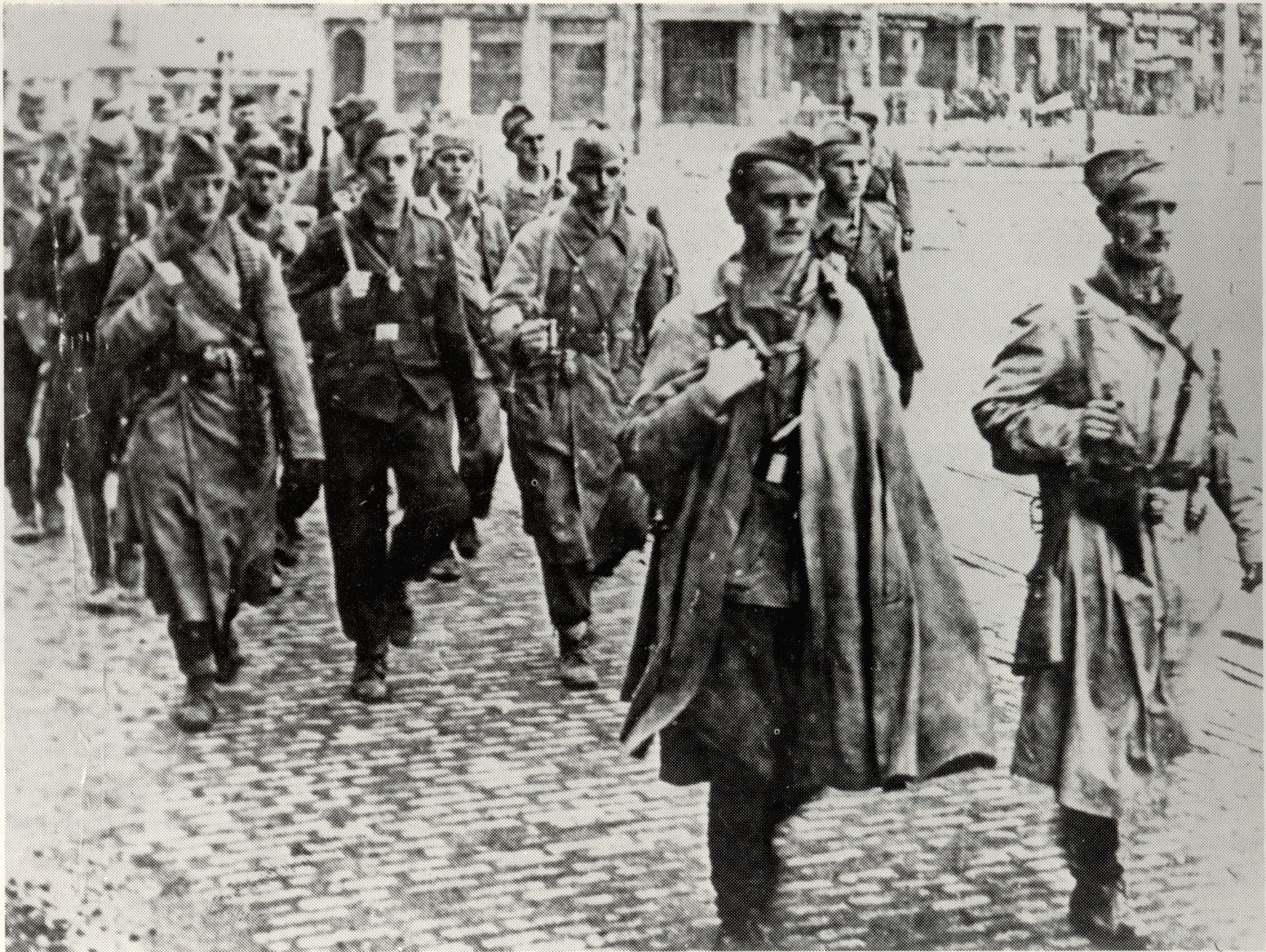
Yugoslav Partisans in liberated Belgrade, October 1944.

From Bari, he calculated that Tito would want to be directing the recapture of Belgrade, so he headed towards there himself, landing at Valjevo with a jeep. It was here that "Lili Marlene", the song broadcast from Radio Belgrade and which he had listened to night after night, from the desert to the mountain tops, finally ceased. "Not long now," he thought. The Partisan troops travelled through Arandjelovac and soon met up with the Red Army, who were being hailed as liberators. Maclean noted that almost every one of them was a fighting soldier, and that their vehicles carried nothing but petrol and ammunition. For the rest, he presumed, they got from the enemy or the local people. "We were witnessing a return to the administrative methods of Attila and Genghis Khan, and the results seemed to deserve careful attention". In the last ten miles outside the capital, they passed hundreds and hundreds of corpses from the recent battle, and a neat stack of a hundred or more who appeared to have been executed. When they reached the HQ of General Peko Dapčević, his chief of staff, who had only a vague notion of the geography of the city, took Maclean and Vivian Street out for a tour, through heavy shelling to which he appeared oblivious. From the terrace of the Kalemegdan, the ancient fort in the middle of the city, they witnessed the withdrawal of German troops over the Danube to the suburb of Zemun. Inexplicably, the Germans failed to blow up the bridge after the last of their troops were over it, which allowed the Russians to follow only minutes behind. Maclean, some time afterwards, found out the answer to this puzzle and compariedit to a fairytale. An old schoolmaster, whose one experience of modern warfare was in the Balkan War of 1912, saw the charges being laid and knew how to disconnect them. He got a gold medal in 1912 and another for this initiative too.

A few days later, Tito arrived, and Maclean had to convey Churchill's displeasure at his sudden and unexplained departure. Tito had been to Moscow at Stalin's invitation to arrange matters with the Soviet High Command. Maclean helped to hammer out a draft agreement, and went to London with it, while Tito's envoys took it to Moscow. "It was a difficult and thankless task. King Peter, quite naturally, was not easy to reassure, and Tito, sitting in Belgrade with all the cards in his hand, was not easy to satisfy". The bargaining went on for months, and meanwhile Maclean's staff wanted to get away, to assist guerrilla wars elsewhere When the Big Three (Churchill, Roosevelt, and Stalin) met at Yalta in February 1945 and made it clear that Tito and Šubašić had to get on with it, King Peter gave in, and all the pieces fell into place. The regents were sworn in, as was the united government, and the British ambassador flew in. Maclean was finally able to leave.

== Quotations ==
- When I got to Cairo, I took a taxi to the address at which I had been told to report. "Ah," said the villainous-looking Egyptian who drove me, when he heard the address. "You want Secret Service."
- (On a reconnaissance trip to occupied Benghazi.) We walked down the middle of the street arm in arm, whistling and doing our best to give the impression that we had every right to be there. Nobody paid the slightest attention to us. On such occasions it's one's manner that counts. If only you can behave naturally, and avoid any appearance of furtiveness, it is worth any number of elaborate disguises and faked documents.
- Clearly it was no easy task to transport several dozen vehicles and a couple of hundred men across 800 miles of waterless desert without attracting the attention of the enemy.
- Another truck full of explosives went up, taking with it all my personal kit. That was another two trucks gone. My equipment was now reduced to an automatic pistol, a prismatic compass and one plated teaspoon. From now onwards I should be travelling light.
- Our meal that night was on a more luxurious scale than anything that we had tasted for some time. In addition to the usual spoonful of bully beef, we used up some of the remaining water in making some hot porridge and brewed up some tea. We also scraped up enough rum for a small tot all round. This we drank after supper, lying on a little sandbank and watching the sun sinking behind the dunes. I cannot remember a meal that I enjoyed more or that seemed more wildly and agreeably extravagant. Extravagant it certainly was, for, when we had finished eating, there was no food left at all, and only enough water to half fill one water-bottle for each man.
- I was to have dinner that night with [Sir Alexander] Cadogan. As I lay in my bath, I reflected that the last time I had seen him had been in his room at the Foreign Office when I had handed him my letter of resignation from the Diplomatic Service. It seemed a long time ago. Looking back on the few but crowded years between, it occurred to me forcibly how fortunate I had been in my decision and how lucky not to miss the experiences which had fallen to my lot in the intervening space of time. To me, it was not disagreeable to look forward to a future of uncertainty and insecurity, with none of the slow inevitability of a career in the Government service; to feel myself, in however small a way, the master of my destiny. With my left foot I turned the hot-water tap full on and wallowed contentedly.
- The day after, I asked my pilot, a cheerful young New Zealander, if he thought we really needed an escort. He said that, unless we had bad luck, he could probably get away from anything except a very up-to-date fighter. I asked him if he would get into trouble if we went without an escort. He replied cheerfully that, if we came back safely, no one would say anything, and if we didn't, it wouldn't matter anyway. This seemed sound enough logic, and so we sent off a signal to Robin, announcing our arrival, and set off on our own.
- I was right: we had been dropped from very low indeed; no sooner had my parachute opened, than I hit the ground with more force than was comfortable.

== See also ==
- Special Operations Executive
