= Bear River, Nova Scotia =

Community in Nova Scotia, Canada

Bear River
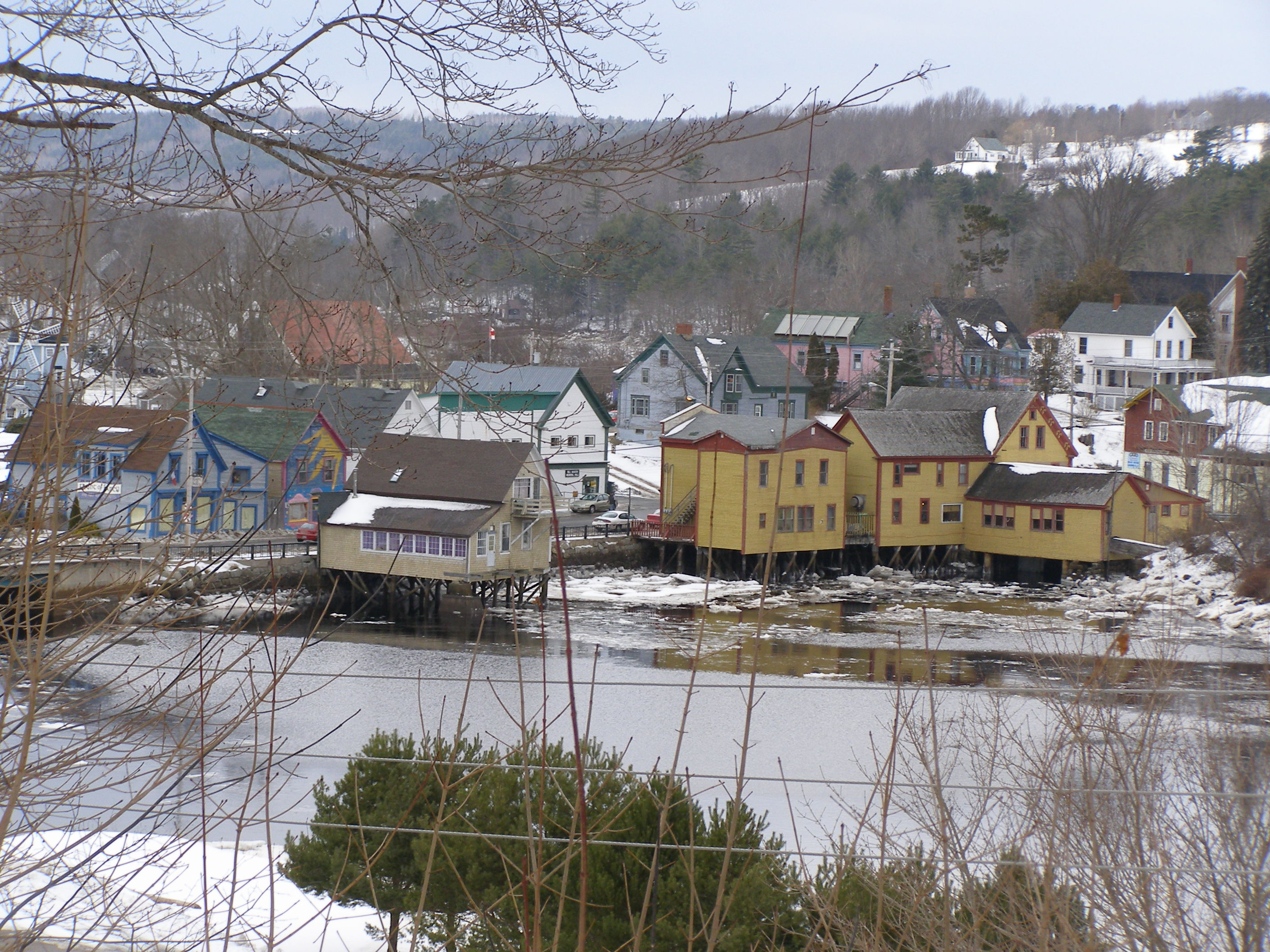

- Location within Nova Scotia
- Coordinates: 44°34′35″N 65°38′21″W
- Country: Canada
- Province: Nova Scotia
- Municipality: Annapolis, Digby
- Time zone: UTC-4 (AST)
  - Summer (DST): UTC-3 (ADT)
- Postal code: B0S 1B0
- Area code: 902
- GNBC Code: CACFI

Bear River is an unincorporated community in the Canadian province of Nova Scotia, located in both Annapolis County and Digby County. The community is situated at the head of the tidewaters of the Bear River, which forms the boundary between the two counties.

The community is adjacent to the Bear River First Nation which administers the Bear River 6, 6A and 6B reserves.

== History ==
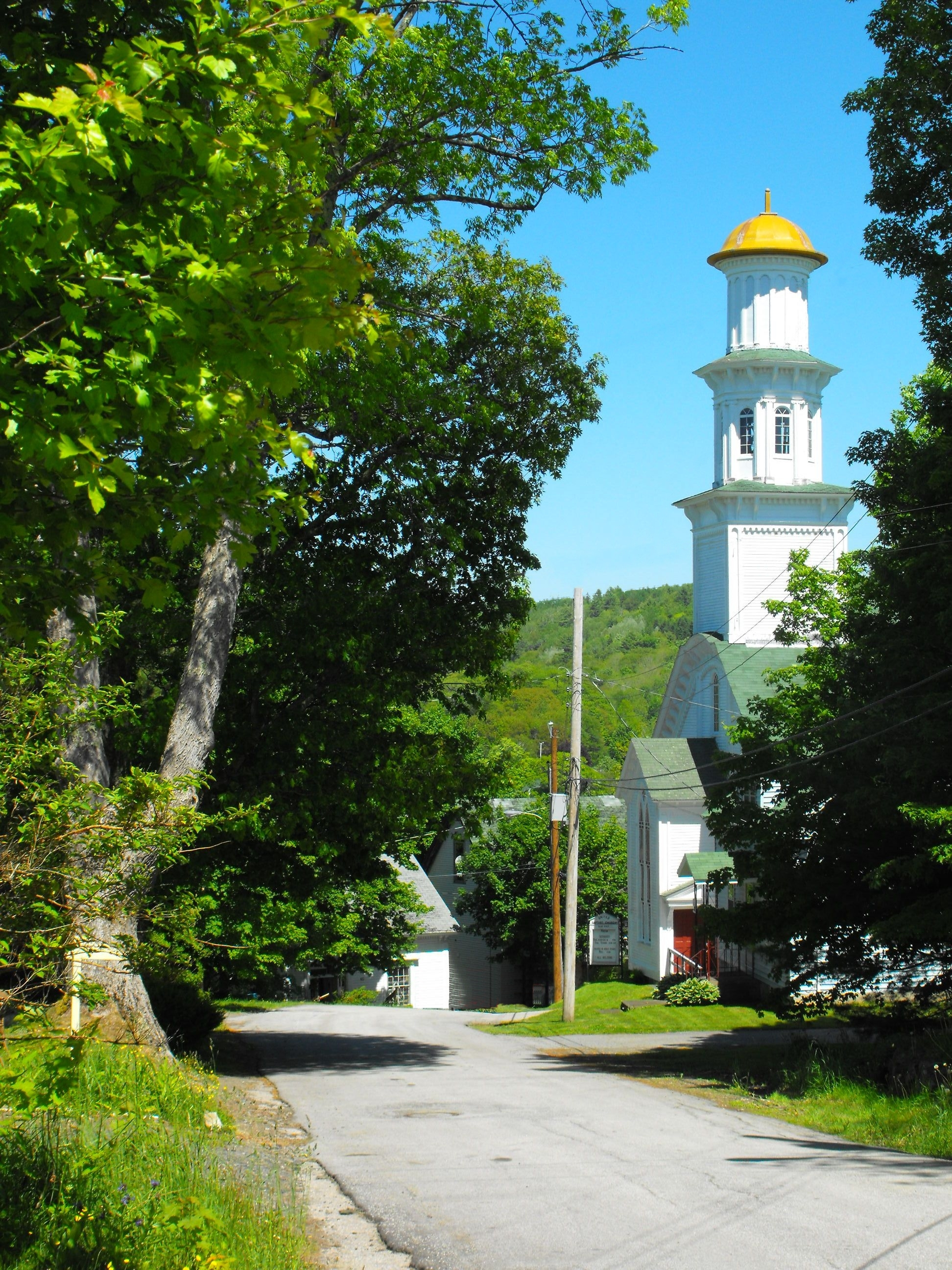
Bear River United Baptist Church

Originally inhabited by the Mi'kmaq, the area was called L'sitkuk, anglicized as "Eelsetkook", meaning "flowing along by high rocks". It was previously called "St. Anthony". It was also named "Imbert", after Simon Imbert, a Frenchman who commanded a relief ship for Port Royal in 1612. The name "Imbert" was gradually corrupted to "Bear". It is also occasionally referred to on maps as "Hillsburgh". This term is believed to be another corruption of "Imbert" or "Hebert", after Louis Hebert, an apothecary who accompanied Samuel de Champlain in 1604.

Bear River was an important shipbuilding location in the late 19th century. One of many large vessels built in the community was the brigantine Dei Gratia, the vessel which discovered the famous mystery ship Mary Celeste in 1872. The climate and soil conditions in the Bear River area are conducive to the growing of grapes and several vineyards have emerged. Bear River was home to the first solar aquatics wastewater management facility in North America; the facility ceased to function when the Municipality of the District of Digby re-routed waste water to the Smith's Cove treatment facility. After a few years of disuse, the community has made it into a community greenhouse. There are many artist studios, shops and galleries in the downtown and immediate area. Crafts produced include clothing, woodwork, pottery, quilts, fabric arts, and an assortment of painted media.

The Bear River Board of Trade is the primary organization to pursue economic development and also maintains the waterfront park and Visitor Information Center. The Bear River Historical Society operates the Bear River Heritage Museum which is open through the summer and early fall with displays of historical photos, archival materials and artifacts of the rich history of the area. The Digby County Exhibition is held in Bear River each year.

== Notable residents ==
- William M. Jones, soldier
- Bob Snider, singer/songwriter
