= Maclean Mission =

World War II Special Operations Executive Mission to Yugoslavia

The Maclean Mission (MACMIS) was a World War II British mission to Yugoslav partisans HQ and Marshal Tito organised by the Special Operations Executive (SOE) in September 1943. Its aim was to assess the value of the partisans' contribution to the Allied cause and the means to increase it. It was led by a recently promoted Brigadier Fitzroy Maclean and was the first such mission with full authorization and a personal message from Winston Churchill. His memoir of these years forms the final third of Eastern Approaches (1949). The mission and the wider British wartime policies were reviewed at a London conference in July 1973, with recently released official records and recollections of some of the participants.

== Background ==
By mid-1943, British government realised, through intercepted German intelligence, that "armed bands bearing the name of Partisans and led by a shadowy figure known as Tito" were causing Germans considerable inconvenience, especially in Bosnia. Very little else was known about them in London. It was believed that they were under communist leadership, with various theories about the identity of Tito ranging from an acronym, rotating post and even "a young woman of startling beauty and great force of character".

A few British officers had been dropped to partisan controlled areas recently, but due to the fierce fighting, there has been no comprehensive report from them. Maclean and his team were sent to "form an estimate on the spot of the relative value of the partisans' contribution to the Allied cause and the best means of helping them to increase it".

On 25 July 1943, Churchill met Maclean at Chequers, the Prime Minister's country house, north-west of London. During the evening, the PM announced that Mussolini had resigned. He then told Maclean:

"This makes your job more important than ever. The German position in Italy is crumbling. We must now put all the pressure we can on them on the other side of the Adriatic. You must go in without delay."

— Maclean, p. 280

Maclean then expressed concern about partisans' leadership communist and pro-Soviet ambitions. Churchill responded:

"So long as the whole Western civilization was threatened by the Nazi menace, we could not afford to let our attention be diverted from the immediate issue by considerations of long-term policy. We are as loyal to our Soviet Allies as we hoped they were to us. Your task is simply to find out who is killing the most Germans and suggest means by which we could help them to kill more. Politics must be a secondary consideration."

— Maclean, p. 280

Maclean, who was a Conservative MP at the time and had no liking for communists, was relieved. He left for Cairo to prepare the mission. On 28 July 1943, Churchill wrote to the Foreign Secretary that he wanted "a daring Ambassador-leader with these hardy and hunted guerrillas", making Maclean an ideal candidate.

Thirty-two-year-old Maclean, a former diplomat realised that the mission would require professional soldiers, explosive, intelligence and supply experts as well as people with political experience. Hence, he picked cavalry officer Robin Whetherly (27), SAS Major Vivian Street and John Henniker-Major (27) another soldier-diplomat to accompany him. Later, they were joined by three sappers: Peter Moore, Donald Knight and Michael Parker who was to be in charge of supply logistics and Gordon Alston (25), an intelligence officer. The security was assigned to Sgt Duncan, Cpl Dickson (Scots Guards) and Cpl Kelly (Seaforth Highlanders) and communication to two wireless operators. Just before the departure, they were joined by an American Major Linn "Slim" Farish (41), who claimed that he could build aerodromes. It was decided to leave two officers, David Satow and Sgt Charlie Button behind as rear-link and supply support.

== Mission ==
In early-Sep 1943, the group flew from Cairo to Bizerta, where they switched planes and boarded Halifax bombers for a flight to the mountains of Bosnia.

=== First impressions and meeting Tito ===
On 17 September 1943, the parachuted group and their cargo landed near Mrkonjić Grad and were met by Vladimir Velebit (36) and Slavko Rodić (25), who helped them move onto Jajce to meet Tito (51). Maclean, who had been to Soviet Union long after the revolution, now saw real-life partisans for the first time:

"They were mostly very young, with high Slav cheek-bones and red stars stitched to their caps and wearing a strange assortment of civilian clothes and captured enemy uniform and equipment. The red star, sometimes embellished with a hammer and sickle, was the only thing common to all of them... While we sat there, messengers kept bringing in situation reports from nearby areas where operations were in progress. As they delivered their messages, they too gave the clenched-fist salute... In Russia, I had only seen the Revolution twenty years after the event, when it was as rigid and pompous and firmly established as any regime in Europe. Now I was seeing the struggle in its initial stages, with the revolutionaries fighting for life and liberty against tremendous odds."

— Maclean, pp. 303-306

Maclean met Tito (51) and explained the purpose and ambition of his mission. Both men were fluent in German and Russian. Maclean explained that the British government had received reports of partisan resistance and were anxious to help. His team of military experts was to establish the extent and nature of the movement as well as report and advise how help could best be given. He suggested sending an officer with a wireless set to each of the main partisan HQs throughout the country and agree the best way to arrange to supplies. Tito agreed and wanted the British representatives to see how the partisans were fighting in different regions. As Italy had recently capitulated, they considered sending supplies by sea, before Germans had had a chance to reoccupy the coast.

The discussion moved onto Chetniks, and possible renewed co-operation between the two forces, which by now seemed impossible. Tito mentioned his initial meetings with Col Mihailović (50), but realised that his troops had become too undisciplined and demoralised from long inaction, and had gone too far in their collaboration with the enemy. He then introduced Father Vlado (40), a Serbian Orthodox priest, who had left chetniks to join the partisans and who in addition to the usual red star, wore a gold cross as his cap badge. They discussed the future of the young King Peter II of Yugoslavia (20), still exiled in London. At a suggestion that the king might return to join the partisans, Tito replied that he could come as a soldier and not as a reigning sovereign, as the question of the future form of government would be settled after the war was over. Finally, Maclean asked if Tito's new Yugoslavia would be an independent state or part of the Soviet Union, the response surprised him somewhat: "You must remember the sacrifices which we are making in this struggle for our independence. Hundreds of thousands of Yugoslavs have suffered torture and death, men, women and children. Vast areas of our countryside have been laid waste. You need not suppose that we shall lightly cast aside a prize which has been won at such cost."

Maclean left the meeting with much to consider. He found Tito having energy, determination and intelligence as well as sense of humour who was ready to give his views on any subject that crops up: "Here, at last, was a communist who did not need to refer everything to the 'competent authorities', to look up the Party line at every step... there was that unexpected independence of mind, that odd lack of servility..."

=== Immersion and the switch of support ===
Maclean's next task was to meet up with the three British officers who had already been posted with the partisans for some time and collate their feedback. Anthony Hunter was a Scots Fusilier who commanded a patrol of LRDG in Croatia. Major Jones was a Canadian officer, who joined the British army before being posted in Slovenia. Finally, Bill Deakin (30), who arrived to Tito's HQ as part of the Operation Typical at the height of the German Fifth Offensive, and "able to give us a better idea than anyone of what the partisans were worth".

What they saw for themselves was very different from what they were told in London and Cairo prior to their departure - "a well-led nationwide resistance movement that had been containing between dozen and twenty enemy divisions".

By now, Maclean had a much better understanding of the partisan movement and its motivation:

"All had one thing in common: an intense pride in their Movement and in its achievements. For them, the outside world did not seem of immediate interest or importance. What mattered was their War of National Liberation, their struggle against the invader, their victories, their sacrifices. Of this, they were proudest of all, that they owed nothing to anyone; that they had got so far without outside help... With this pride went a spirit of dedication, hard not to admire. The life of every one of them was ruled by rigid self-discipline, complete austerity; no drinking, no looting, no love-making. It was though each one of them were bound by a vow, a vow part ideological and part military, for, in the conditions under which they were fighting, any relaxation of discipline would have been disastrous; nor could private desires and feelings be allowed to count for anything."

— Maclean, pp. 324-325

The movement was led by a group of young army officers and revolutionaries: Arso Jovanović (36), Tito's CoS, former Royal Yugoslav Army officer, was "coldly competent", Edvard Kardelj (33), the expert Marxist dialectician was "perfectly frank, perfectly logical, perfectly calm and unruffled", Aleksandar Ranković (34) in charge of the Intelligence services who was "not, you felt, a man who would come off worst in a bargain", Milovan Đilas (32), "young, intolerant and good looking" and Moša Pijade (53), an elderly Jewish Belgrade intellectual who became a "favourite target for Nazi propaganda". Finally, the two women, in charge of keeping Tito's maps, lists and bundles of signals were Davorjanka-Zdenka Paunović (22) and Olga Humo (24). Olga, "tall and well-built, in her black breeches and boots, with a pistol hanging at her belt", was especially useful to the British mission as she was one of the rare people who spoke fluent English having attended a finishing school in London before the war.

After a long period of observation, investigation and feedback from officers in the field, Maclean drafted his report. In it he stated that the partisans, whatever their politics, were fighting the Germans most effectively. They were more numerous, better led, organised and disciplined than the Chetniks, who were largely either not fighting at all or fighting with the Germans against their own countrymen. At the time, the partisans were containing a dozen or more enemy divisions and by increasing the "practically non-existent supplies" to them and giving them air-support, the Allies could ensure that they continued to contain this force. Their operations, if coordinated, could be of direct assistance to the recently arrived Allied armies in Italy.

Finally, Maclean had stated that the Allies were getting little or no return militarily from the arms they had dropped to the Chetniks, and that they were used against the partisans, who were fighting the Germans, and were impeding rather than furthering the war effort. He concluded that, purely on military grounds, the Allies should stop supplies to the Chetniks and "henceforth send all available arms and equipment to the partisans".

=== Journey to the coast ===
While in contact with the Royal Navy, Maclean had arranged for the landing supplies to the island of Korčula, recently freed from the Italian army. He suggested that he would go there himself, with a wireless set and give particulars about the landing facilities. The first section of the journey, from Jajce to Bugojno was done "rather surprisingly" by a captured train, which left the station followed by the whistles of three retired station masters "complete with magnificent peaked caps, liberally adorned with gold braids, flags, whistles and all paraphernalia of office" on 5 October 1943.

In Bugojno, by now largely in ruins, Maclean noticed a group of Domobran POWs, who were "miserable troops...took the first opportunity of deserting or let themselves be taken prisoner" and whom "partisans regarded with good-natured toleration". He then met up with Koča Popović (35), the commander of Partisan First Corps, who made quite an impression:

"I have seldom met anyone who gave a more vivid impression of mental and physical activity... he had the same tense, strained look as all the Partisan leaders, a look which comes from long months of physical and mental stress... Vitality radiated from his leathery, drawn features... He spoke French like a Frenchman (and a very witty Frenchman at that)... the science of warfare had first become a reality to him in Spain, where he had fought for the Republicans, an experience which had left a profound impression on him."

— Maclean, p. 346

After Bugojno, the group was on the move to Kupres and Livno, marching on foot beside their packed horses. They were unsure if it was safe to continue, when they encountered Ivo Lola Ribar (27), who "had a distinguished fighting record", and who confirmed that the partisans had recaptured Livno and were fighting in Kupres, which would also be in their hands shortly. After being unable to establish wireless contact with Cairo HQ at Kupres, they were driven by a shot-down Italian pilot who delivered them in a captured motor-bus to Livno at night. The next stop was Aržano, after which they continued onto Zadvarje and finally on foot to Baška Voda. Once there, the group was met by two partisan fishermen, who took them in their fishing smack to Sućuraj, and finally reached Korčula at dawn.

=== On Korčula ===
Once on the island, Maclean met the local partisan representatives as well as a Franciscan friar, who was the chairman of the local council, and who somewhat surprisingly greeted him with a clenched fist salute. After a short rest, the group was taken on a drive around the island. They met the locals, inspected partisan detachments, the hospital and printworks even being "pelted with flowers by some nuns". Maclean noticed that, in contrast to the mainland, the Roman Catholic clergy in Korčula seem to be the "leading lights in the Partisan Movement".

Due to technical problems with the radio, they were unable to contact Cairo or Jajce and spent time planning the next steps. It was then that they witnessed the first aerial bombardment of Korčula harbour by a dozen Stuka bombers. Finally, a British Navy M.L., laden with several tons of arms and supplies, speculatively docked at the other end of the island. David Satow, Maclean's assistant, brought in the sailors, including Sandy Glenn, whom Maclean recognised immediately. As the partisans were off-loading the cargo, news came from Pelješac peninsula that the Germans were advancing and preparing a naval invasion fleet at the mouth of the river Neretva. Maclean managed to send two messages from the Navy vessel. One was to Air Vice-Marshall Coningham asking for an aerial attack on German troop concentrations at Mostar, Metković and Pelješac and their invasion barges at the mouth of the Neretva. The second message was sent to the Navy's Flag Officer at Taranto asking for some Motor Torpedo Boats (MTBs) to be sent to patrol off the mouth of the Neretva. Both messages were received and acted upon as the group was getting ready for the return journey to Jajce. As Baška Voda was by now in German hands, their small fishing boat took them to Podgora, where they bumped into Gordon Alston and his W/T operator. They were on their way from Jajce to the islands, bringing a spare wireless set, mail and the news for the Maclean's group.

=== Towards Vis ===
Maclean returned to Jajce to agree on the future action with Tito. He told him that he would return to Cairo to find out "what prospect there was of securing effective Allied support in Dalmatia". Tito agreed, and asked him to take two partisan representatives, Ivo Lola Ribar and Miloje Milojević (31), with him. Maclean accepted, stating that he would seek the approval from the Commander-in-Chief and the Foreign Office. The time was of the essence as the Germans were consolidating their positions and were about to close the access to the Dalmatian islands. Maclean and Tito knew that agreeing to host a partisan delegation would put British government on a collision course with the Royal Yugoslav Government (in-exile) who were their allies and the official representatives of the country. They anticipated a long wait. Maclean, in the meantime, had to leave for the island of Hvar, expecting Ribar and Milojević to join him once the agreement to host them has been reached.

After the midnight crossing, Maclean reached the town of Hvar and was welcomed by the local people. They were aware that the enemy had already landed at the western shore of the island. He got in touch with Cairo who instructed him to come immediately via the island of Vis, and that the partisan delegation could follow later "if required". Maclean realised that the Germans were continuing to advance and that the coast would be cut-off very soon. He reached Vis after an overnight trip on a fishing boat. He realised the strategic importance of the island which was within striking distance of the coast yet far enough out to sea for it to be reasonably easy to hold and access from Italy. It was to make an ideal base for future supplies. From Vis, the Navy Motor Launch took him to southern Italy.

=== To Cairo and back ===
By 5 November 1943, Maclean had reached Cairo and realised why he was summoned at this time. A large British delegation including the Foreign Secretary Anthony Eden, the Permanent Under-Secretary Sir Alexander Cadogan and others was there on its way back from Moscow in preparation for the Tehran Conference. He handed a written report on the situation in Yugoslavia to Eden who promised to forward it to Churchill. He also verbally confirmed to him that the partisan movement was effective, likely to be very influential after the war and that their effectiveness could be considerably increased by Allied help. The report had caused a stir.

=== Trying to extract the Partisan delegation ===
Maclean returned to Bari and managed to get in contact with Tito's HQ at Jajce. As expected the Dalmatian coast was now fully blocked and the only way to extract the delegation would be to land an aeroplane at the air-strip at Glamoč and fly them out. The mission would require a large enough passenger aircraft capable of completing the return journey while escorted by some half a dozen fighters. Maclean was promised a Baltimore bomber and a group of Lightnings and the timing was agreed. Two attempts were made to reach Glamoč but due to thick storm clouds both had to be abandoned. By now, the fighters needed to be redeployed elsewhere, and Maclean made the third attempt un-escorted. This time they tried to get under the cloud cover but to no avail. On the return to Italy, they were told that Bari airfield had too low visibility and to land in Foggia instead where they spent the following two days in a downpour of rain.

By the time they re-established full communications, a tragedy occurred. Partisans had captured a small German aeroplane and were intending to fly out the delegation themselves. They had informed Bari in order to warn the RAF and anti-aircraft batteries not to shoot at their small aeroplane with German markings and refuelled. On 27 November 1943, at first light, as the passengers and those who had come to see them off had gathered around the aircraft, they had noticed a small German observation plane. It flew quickly very low over their heads and dropped two small bombs. One exploded near Robin Whetherly and killed him. The other hit the aircraft, destroying it completely and killing Donald Knight and Ribar, and wounding Milojević.

As the improvised airfield at Glamoč was unlikely to remain in partisan hands for much longer, the operation was given a higher priority, and Maclean was able to fly over in a troop-carrying Dakota escorted by half a dozen Lightning fighters on 3 December 1943. The Dakota had landed in broad daylight while the Lightnings circled above. Without switching off the engines, William Deakin, Vladimir Velebit and Anthony Hunter boarded the plane, together with wounded Milojević and Vladimir Dedijer (30). Finally, Captain Meyer, captured German intelligence officer, was put on board on his way to Bari for interrogation. The plane took off completing the first successful landing operation in enemy-occupied Yugoslavia.

=== In Cairo again ===
Cairo in early-Dec 1943 was the right place at the right time. Both Churchill and F.D. Roosevelt were there, on their return journey from Tehran. Maclean and Deakin went to the Prime Minister's villa out by the Pyramids. He was still in bed, "smoking a cigar and wearing an embroidered dressing-gown" and questioned Maclean if he had parachuted wearing a kilt, before moving onto a more pressing issue of the Yugoslav fight. Churchill confirmed that he had read Maclean's report and together with all other available information had discussed it with Stalin and Roosevelt. Finally, the three had decided to give all-out support to the partisans. The question of continuing support to Chetnik forces was raised by the British officers attached to their formations who advised that Chetniks' resistance was not solid, their troops ill-disciplined and their commanders collaborating more or less openly with the enemy. In short, their contribution to the Allied cause was by now little or nothing. Their commander, General Mihailović, was given a last chance to blow two railway bridges on the strategic Belgrade to Salonika railway. If he failed to carry out the operation by the agreed date of 29 December 1943, the missions would be withdrawn and the supplies to Chetniks would cease. Indeed, that was the final outcome.

Maclean once more raised the concern about the partisans' commitment to the Soviet Union once the fighting had finished when Churchill asked:

"'Do you intend, to make Yugoslavia your home after the war?'

'No, Sir.' I replied.

'Neither do I,' he said. 'And, that being so, the less you and I worry about the form of Government they set up, the better. That is for them to decide. What interests us is, which of them is doing most to harm the Germans?'"

— Maclean, pp. 402-403

Maclean realised that the Soviet Union had remained an ally since 1941 and that the British were doing everything in their power to bolster up the Soviet war effort. This was done without examining too closely their political system or the circumstances which had brought them into the war on the same side. It was also possible that the nationalist forces in Yugoslavia would overwhelm the communists in the end. There was however one major unresolved issue: the British government had continued to support the Yugoslav government-in-exile and King Peter II, who also happened to be in Cairo at the time. Maclean arranged a dinner with the king and the British ambassador Ralph Stevenson. The king asked him what the partisans and other people thought of him, and what were his chances of reclaiming the throne after the war. The response was that the partisans resented some radio proclamations condemning their leaders as traitors and that many did not take much interest in him. As for the return to the throne, Maclean's opinion was that the king would have to go back and take part in the war of liberation, as his father had done in the last war. The king replied: "I wish that it only depended on me.".

The next task was to agree with senior British officers to form a nucleus of the new Yugoslav Air force and Navy by training partisan fighters. At the same time, the immediate need of the air supply and air support had to take priority. It was agreed to increase substantially the amount of supplies and number of dedicated aircraft and that regional missions would be dropped to smaller partisan HQs in order to organise supply, train and advise them. New officers were added including Andrew Maxwell and John Clarke of the Scots Guards and Geoffrey Kup, a gunner. Finally, Randolph Churchill, the Prime Minister's 32-year-old son, who followed his father to Tehran and back, agreed to join the mission. Maclean thought that Randolph was dependable, had endurance and determination, and that his sometimes explosive approach to life was similar to a Yugoslav one, and that they might well like him for that.

=== Return to Yugoslavia ===
Maclean's team flew to Italy and crossed the Adriatic in a motor-torpedo-boat, passing by two British Navy Hunt Class destroyers, and realising the higher attention that the area was now receiving. They arrived at Vela Luka on the island of Korčula and off-loaded the arms and ammunition that they had brought with them. By now, the Germans had taken over the neighbouring Pelješac peninsula and started exchanging shell-fire across a narrow strait that separated them. It became obvious that Korčula could not be held for much longer, and that the preparation for the evacuation onto the island of Vis, the farthest away from the mainland, should start. Once on Vis, Maclean and the team inspected the island and realised that its main valley would make an ideal airfield. Having an ability to base or refuel there would extend the Allied air-power range across the whole of Adriatic and deep into Yugoslavia. However, they needed to garrison the island, and while the partisans offered one brigade, another one had to be found from the Allied 15th Army Group still fighting in central Italy. Maclean and Randolph Churchill returned to Bari to consider their options.

On 31 December 1943 at a New Year's Eve party in nearby Molfetta, Randolph and Maclean met with brothers Jack and Tom Churchill (no relation), young Commando officers who offered to help and station their unit on Vis subject to approval by high command. Both General Alexander, the commander of the 15th Army Group and his CoS General John Harding were keen to help. They realised that supporting partisans in Yugoslavia would ensure fewer German troops available for deployment and reinforcements on the Italian front. On 6 January 1944 Jack Churchill was ordered to make a reconnaissance of Vis, while Maclean and Randolph flew out to Marrakesh to meet the Prime Minister again. Mr Churchill (senior) was informed that Jajce had fallen to the Germans and that Tito and his HQ were on the move once again. He realised that they needed some encouragement and wrote a personal letter to Tito. He congratulated him on his past achievements and held out the hope of future help. He then instructed Maclean to deliver it personally, without delay. They flew back to Bari and soon were parachuted near Bosanski Petrovac. The group consisted of Maclean, Randolph, Sgt Duncan, Sgt Campbell (new W/T operator), Cpl. Iles (signaller) and Slim Farish returning from a brief visit to the US.

They were welcomed on the ground by John Selby and Slavko Rodić who took Maclean to see Tito in a makeshift camp nearby. They reached his hut just after midnight and Maclean congratulated him on being given the rank of Marshal of Yugoslavia in November 1943. He then handed him the letter from the Prime Minister, which Tito did not expect. Maclean witnessed Tito's reaction, opening the seal and unfolding the heavy paper with the address of 10 Downing Street and the PM's signature at the bottom, enclosed with a signed photograph. He saw Tito smile and try to translate the wording, and understand the complimentary references to the partisan fight and promises of Allied assistance as well as advice on future mutual correspondence via Maclean. Tito, the underground fighter perpetually in conflict with the established order, realised that he and his movement were finally recognised as an ally and were in direct and formal communication with the Prime Minister of a Great Power. He understood that the official and public recognition might not be far away. The questions of the partisans' contribution to the Allied cause and the best way to assist them had been fully answered.

=== At Drvar ===
After a few days in snow-covered Bosanski Petrovac, the Mission, together with the Partisan HQ, moved onto Drvar, a small town farther away from German garrisons. The Mission occupied an adapted house in town, while Tito's HQ opted for a nearby cave. From there, they were able to coordinate the assistance to Partisans in other parts of Yugoslavia. One of the key tasks was to interrupt the Trieste-Ljubljana railway, crucial for the supply of the German forces in Italy, and a vital link between the Eastern and Western fronts. An air-drop of explosives was arranged, and Peter Moore was sent to Slovenia to blow up the Stampetta Bridge, a key viaduct on the line. The operation, code-named 'Bearskin', was a great success, as the bridge was severely damaged and remained so for some time. The co-operation between Moore and the local Partisan troops had proven to be very effective.

By now, the situation had somewhat stabilised and Allied aeroplanes were able to drop new members to the mission. These included Major (Doctor) Lindsay Rogers RAMC (NZ) who led his own Mission and organised improvised hospitals throughout the Partisan controlled territory, insisting on standards of hygiene, medical discipline and the isolation and treatment of the many typhus cases. He was also able to organise air-drops of large quantities of medications.

One of the more surprising arrivals was the very first Soviet Military Mission, headed by the Red Army General Nikolai Vasilevich Korneev, on 23 February 1944. Due to constant heavy snow, the Partisans were unable to keep clear a sufficiently large runway for an aircraft to land and take-off, and the Soviets did not want to be parachuted. Finally, two Horsa gliders were found and pulled over by two Dakotas with a fighter escort. The General and his crew landed safely.

=== Back to London ===
By April, as the snow started to melt, and the Partisan movement grew in strength, Maclean was told to report to London in person in order to agree on the next course of action. He was authorised to bring a Partisan representative with him, so Velebit came along as well. They made their way back to Bosanski Petrovac and the nearby landing-strip. They were air-lifted quickly, together with a group of badly wounded Partisans and flown to Algiers in a Dakota. From there, Maclean made a phone-call to Winston Churchill and was told that he and Velebit must continue onto London at once.

They found the country in suspense, with numerous American and Allied troops preparing for the D-Day invasion. They were taken to meet senior army officers including General Eisenhower and finally the Prime Minister. Velebit was pleased with being able to put his point of view to Mr Churchill personally and had made other useful contacts within the Establishment and the Press, hoping to keep Tito and the Partisan movement before the mind of the public. He then flew back, preceded by Vivian Street who took charge of the mission while Maclean remained in London for numerous further discussions.

Maclean met Joint Planners, the representatives of each branch of the armed forces, and agreed the best way to help the Partisans and increase their contribution to the war effort as a whole. On the political front, he met King Peter II, a trained pilot, and agreed that the King could maybe join the RAF Yugoslav Squadron, which "appealed to him". He then met Dr Ivan Šubašić, a moderate former Governor of Croatia, who was trying to reach out for a settlement between the Royal Yugoslav Government and Tito. Finally, he met some of the British Liaison Officers (BLOs) who were attached to General Mihailović HQ, including the one at Chequers presided by the Prime Minister:

"We found there was little or no disagreement between us as to the facts. It was common ground that the Četniks, though in the main well disposed towards Great Britain, were militarily less effective than the Partisans and that some of Mihailović's subordinates had undoubtedly reached accommodations with the enemy. I was interested to find that some of those who knew him best, while liking and respecting him as a man, had little opinion of Mihailović as a leader."

— Maclean, p. 448

Shortly after this meeting, Maclean received a call from Buckingham Palace stating that King George VI wished to see him to get "a first-hand account of the Yugoslav situation". Maclean was surprised that the King was so interested in a relatively minor question of policy, given the much greater issues of the day. The King, on the other hand, was fully briefed and realistic about the situation and mainly interested in the military side of Mission's work. Maclean was left very much impressed.

=== Return to Vis ===
As Maclean was preparing for the return journey, an urgent signal arrived from Vivian Street stating that on 25 May there had been a large-scale airborne attack on Partisan HQ with gliders and parachute troops, that the Partisans had suffered heavy casualties and that Tito and the Allied missions had managed to escape capture. Unbeknown to him, a meticulously planned and executed Operation Rösselsprung was underway. Tito had by now realised that he could no longer lead the Partisan movement while being constantly on the move. The decision was made to evacuate the HQ and the missions, first to Bari and then on to Vis. The flight was organised by the RAF and executed by a Russian crew.

Once on Vis, Tito was able to conduct the movement while extending the co-operation with the Allies. Shortly afterwards he was invited to Naples to meet with the Supreme Allied Commander in the Mediterranean General Maitland Wilson and the British Prime Minister Winston Churchill. The Naples Conference was a success, the two leaders got on well and Churchill was "generous in his praise for Tito's leadership and in his recognition of the Partisans' contribution to the Allied cause". He also insisted that there could be no political recognition of the Partisan regime unless they came to some kind of arrangement with King Peter II, and warned Tito against a Soviet-style collectivisation of agriculture. After the ten-day sojourn, the group returned to Vis to manage political and military events ahead.

As the Allies pushed towards Berlin, there was an expectation that the Germans would cut their losses and withdraw their troops from the Balkans to a "more tenable defence line in the north". This would refresh and reinforce their presence there and prolong the war. Their withdrawal from the region had to be disrupted. Maclean came up with a plan called Operation Ratweek, a week of intensive attacks on the lines of transport and communication, fuel supplies and general disruptions. He flew to Serbia to direct the activities in person and stayed there until the end of the operation when he was ordered to return to Italy as Tito had unexpectedly left Vis.

== Finale ==
Maclean assumed that Tito had moved inland in order to direct the liberation of Belgrade. He decided to fly to a recently liberated Valjevo and continue his search in Serbia. Partisan troops moved quickly and after a couple of days in Aranđelovac, Maclean and his team left for Belgrade on 20 October. Their three-jeep expedition included two BLOs - Vivian Street and Freddie Cole and two Americans - Colonel Ellery Huntington, the Commander of the US Military Mission to the Partisans and Charles Thayer, his second-in-command and a friend of Maclean from the prewar Moscow days. The fact that the two spoke Russian was very useful when encountering Soviet troops on their way. They eventually reached the centre of the city and its main vantage point, Kalemegdan, from where they observed the hasty withdrawal of German troops pursued by the Soviets.

Belgrade was finally liberated and Maclean met up with Tito at his new residence on 27 October. They discussed the cooperation difficulties posed by Tito's sudden departure from Vis and the future political resolution for Yugoslavia. Maclean resumed his diplomatic and military activities from the old British Embassy building and assisted in the information flow between the Foreign Office, Tito, King Peter II and others during the negotiations. Eventually, a new government was established and Ralph Stevenson, the existing ambassador to the Royal Yugoslav Government moved to Belgrade, replacing Maclean. This marked the end of his mission.

== See also ==
- Operation Floxo

== Sources ==
- Auty, Phyllis; Clogg, Richard (1975). British Policy Towards Wartime Resistance in Yugoslavia and Greece. London and Basingstoke: The Macmillan Press Ltd. ISBN 0-333-16634-5.
- Deakin, F. W. D. (2011). The Embattled Mountain. London: Faber and Faber Ltd. ISBN 978-0-571-27644-8.
- Maclean, Fitzroy (1991). Eastern Approaches. London: Penguin Books. ISBN 978-0-141-04284-8.
- McConville, Michael (2007). A Small War in the Balkans. Uckfield: The Naval & Military Press Ltd. ISBN 978-1-847347-13-8.
- Williams, Heather (2003). Parachutes, Patriots, and Partisans. London: C. Hurst & Co. (Publishers) Ltd. ISBN 1-85065-592-8.
