= Operation Ratweek (1944) =

Coordinated attacks during World War II

Operation Ratweek was a series of coordinated attacks on the Axis forces' communication lines in the Balkans during World War II. Launched on 1 September 1944. the attack was led by the combined operations units of the Yugoslav Partisans, Land Forces Adriatic, the heavy bombers of the U.S. 15th Air Force and the light and medium bombers of the Balkan Air Force.

The attacks paralysed movement of the German forces. In his memoir Eastern Approaches, Fitzroy Maclean claims this was his idea.

In September, 1944, there was a famous operation, planned by Brigadier Maclean, then commanding Allied liaison in Jugoslavia, in conjunction with Balkan Air Forces under Air Vice Marshal Elliott, and carried out by the Jugoslav Army, that aimed at disrupting all enemy lines of communication to coincide with certain operations in Italy. It was called "Ratweek"; and for the target duration of one week it was possible by action in all areas to paralyse all movement of enemy men and supplies on practically every length of line in Jugoslavia, whether in Slovenia, Croatia, Serbia, Macedonia, or elsewhere.

— Basil Davidson

== Background ==
In the summer of 1944, Allied commanders realised that the German offensive in the Balkans was slackening, and that they may cut their losses and withdraw to a more easily tenable defence line in the north, abandoning the region altogether. At this time, two German Army Groups (E and F) consisting of 18 divisions and around 50 additional battalions were spread across Greece, Albania and Yugoslavia. It became obvious that this would prolong the war in central and western Europe as the German troops got reinforcements. Their withdrawal had to be prevented or disrupted. While some troops on the move were already harassed by air attacks and Partisan demolitions, this needed to be done in a more effective and systematic manner rather than ad-hoc. Brigadier Fitzroy Maclean, Allied representative at Yugoslav Partisans HQ at Vis, and the commander of the Maclean Mission, came up with a plan:

The scheme was called "Operation RATWEEK". My proposal was that, for the space of one week, timed to coincide as closely as possible with the estimated beginning of the German withdrawal, the Partisans on land and the Allies on the sea and in the air, should make a series of carefully planned, carefully co-ordinated attacks on enemy lines of communication throughout Jugoslavia. This would throw the retiring forces into confusion and gravely hamper further withdrawal.

— Maclean, p. 471

Once he had the agreement of the Balkan Air Force (BAF) Commander William Elliot, the Navy, and the Supreme Allied Commander in the Mediterranean General Maitland Wilson, Maclean consulted with Tito and got his commitment as well. The territory of Yugoslavia was divided up into sectors with a Partisan Commander and his British Liaison Officer (BLO) responsible for each. The list of potential targets (such as bridges, viaducts, tunnels, railway junctions, etc.) was agreed and those that Partisans could not destroy alone were allocated to the BAF or the heavy bombers of the USAAF. Additional explosives and ammunition were dropped, and tactical and strategic air support agreed. Finally, the Royal Navy destroyers and the MTBs engaged on the sea lanes of the Adriatic coast, now in extensive use by the Germans as an alternative way out of the southern Balkans.

== Key events ==
The main withdrawal from Greece was expected via the Vardar Valley and the Belgrade-Salonika railway. This was identified as the key target, and at the end of August 1944, Maclean flew to Bojnik in Serbia. There, he joined the local commander Koča Popović and his BLO John Henniker-Major to organise the destruction of the railway at Leskovac. The three officers agreed on the plan of action and relayed it to the Allied force HQ at Caserta. Maclean was left with the local commander of the 24th Partisan Division to work out the details.

The plan was for the Partisans to attack the two points north and south of Leskovac, while the town, the seat of a large German garrison, would be left to the Allied air force. On 6 September, the day of the proposed attack, an urgent message from William Elliot arrived stating that the air reconnaissance confirmed the presence of a strong concentration of armour and motor transport in town. Soon after, an air force of fifty Flying Fortresses bombed the town heavily in a surprise attack, reducing much of it to rubble with a large number of civilian casualties.

The attack on the remaining railroad went ahead on the same night, with the Partisans blowing up small bridges and culverts as well as tearing up the sleepers and setting them on fire. Strategically, the operation was a success as:

It would be some time before that particular stretch of the Belgrade-Salonika railway was again open to traffic. The enemy forces in Greece, if they were to get out at all, would have to get out by road or by sea, a hazardous proceeding in either event. If everywhere else the Partisans had done their job as thoroughly as here, RATWEEK would have got off to a good start.

— Maclean, p. 489

In other parts of the country, the operation continued. In Slovenia, the strategic Litija bridge on the Ljubljana-Zagreb railway was destroyed by the USAAF Mustangs and an American officer, Jimmy Goodwin, who joined the Partisans in the assault on the ancient castle guarding the bridge. Further south, the rail links between the river Sava and the Adriatic as well as the Danube bridges in the vicinity of Belgrade were also targeted.

Meanwhile, back in Serbia, Maclean had noticed a few German Junkers 52 flying northbound. Assuming that these were senior officers trying to extract themselves from the situation by air, he quickly alerted the BAF whose fighters had eventually closed this loophole.

The initial damage was followed by protracted interference with German attempts to repair it. Partisan observers reported the locations of repair gangs to the BAF HQ in Bari, who would send fighters to shoot at the restorers.

In total, over 100 locomotives were destroyed, together with many trunk railway lines, forcing the enemy onto the roads where fuel and truck shortages left them vulnerable to further attacks. It is estimated that over 300 trucks were destroyed by air sorties and many more by Partisan raids. At the same time, the Luftwaffe in Yugoslavia was crippled, losing 94 aircraft, while the Long Range Desert Group, the Special Boat Service and the Royal Navy attacked targets along the Adriatic coast.

== Conclusion ==
On 9 September, Bulgaria capitulated and switched sides, belatedly joining the Allies' cause. Maclean was planning to spend more time in Serbia preventing German withdrawal, but in the second half of September, he received a personal signal from General Wilson. It said that Tito had disappeared from Vis and that he needed to come out and find him. His return flight from Bojnik to Bari marked the end of the Operation Ratweek.
