= Bear River First Nation =

Bear River First Nation L'sɨtkuk (Mi'kmaq)
- Location of Bear River First Nation in Nova Scotia
- Coordinates: 44°32′59″N 65°38′36″W
- Country: Canada
- Province: Nova Scotia
- County: Digby County
- Established: 1820

Government
  - Chief: Carol Dee Potter

Area
  - Land: 2.01 km^{2} (0.78 sq mi)

Population (2025)
  - Total: 402
- Time zone: UTC-4 (Atlantic (AST))
  - Summer (DST): UTC-3 (ADT)
- Website: http://www.bearriverfirstnation.ca/
- Postal code span: B0S 1B0

Bear River First Nation (Mi'kmaq: L'sɨtkuk or Ls'tgug) is a Míkmaq First Nations band government located in both Annapolis County and Digby County, Nova Scotia. As of 2023, the Mi'kmaq population is 118 on-Reserve, and approximately 263 off-Reserve for a total population of 382.

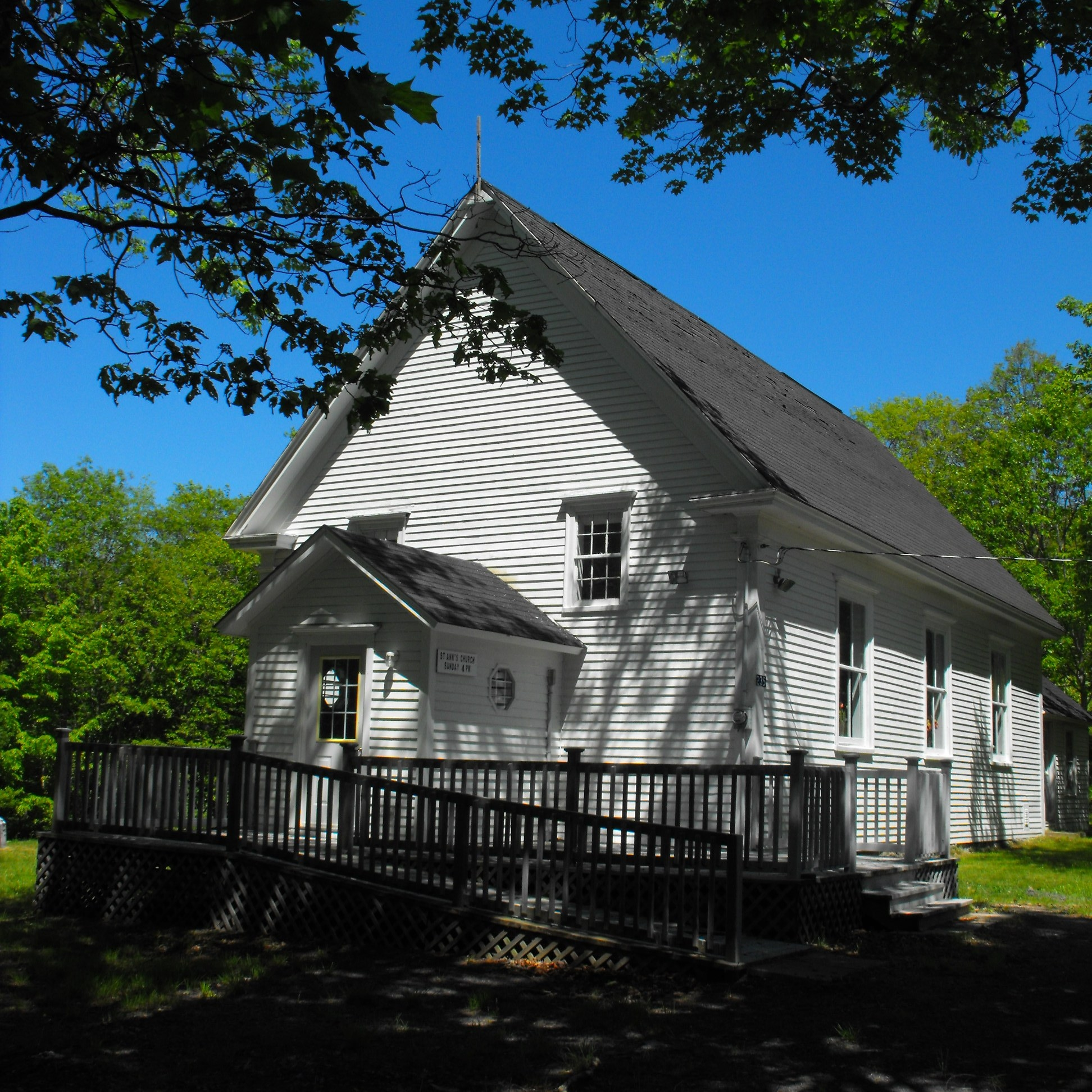
St. Ann's Church, Bear River FN

Bear River First Nation lies adjacent to the village of Bear River, Nova Scotia. It has a church, Saint Anne's, completed in 1836, and a school which serves toddlers and preschoolers. The Mi'kmaq language is taught to children attending the school. A health centre was established in 1998.

== History ==
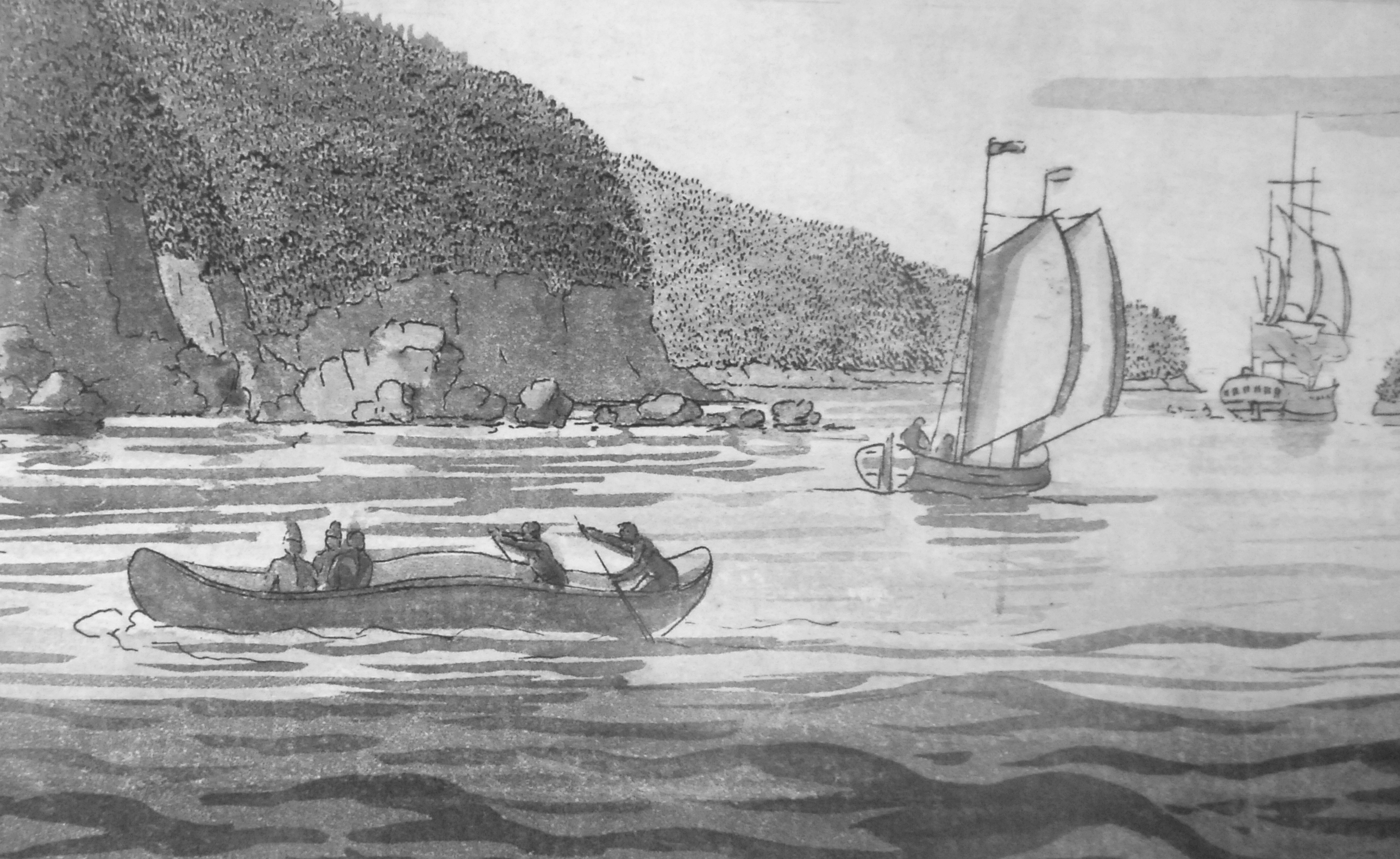
Mi'kmaq canoe on the Bay of Fundy. Atlantic Neptune, ca 1770

Archaeological evidence suggests the community has existed in the area for 2,000 to 4,000 years. It lies in the ancient District of Kespukwitk, a part of the Mi'kmaq nation. The people of Bear River are the Indigenous community whose ancestors welcomed Pierre Dugua, Sieur de Mons, Samuel de Champlain and others who settled at Port-Royal in 1605. The sakmow, or chief, at that time was Henri Membertou who befriended the French. The area around Port-Royal was the traditional summering site of Membertou's people.

The community were known as canoe builders who used their craft for fishing and hunting porpoise, in the Annapolis Basin and Bay of Fundy. Oil rendered from the porpoise was sold as a machine lubricant into the early part of the twentieth century.

== Tourism ==
Each summer the Bear River First Nation Heritage & Cultural Centre offers authentic cultural immersion in the life and traditions of the Mi'kmaq, featuring hands-on craft-making workshops.

== Composition ==
The Bear River First Nation is composed of three parts as shown, of which the largest is regularly occupied:

Community	Area	Location	Population (as of 2016)	Date established
Bear River 6	633.8 hectares (1,566 acres)	17.6 km. southeast of Digby	138	March 3, 1820
Bear River 6A	31.2 hectares (77 acres)	9.6 km. southeast of Annapolis Royal	0	March 3, 1938
Bear River 6B	24.3 hectares (60 acres)	6.4 km. southeast of Annapolis Royal	16	October 1, 1962

== Notable people ==
- shalan joudry – poet and playwright

== See also ==
- Peter Paul Toney Babey
