= Shalan joudry =

Mi'kmaw writer, storyteller, and ecologist

shalan joudry
- Born: 1979 (age 46–47); L’sɨtkuk (Bear River First Nation)
- Website: www.shalanjoudry.com

shalan joudry (Note: Joudry chooses to capitalize neither her name nor the personal pronoun 'i' so as to "be consistent with not over-emphasizing myself in relation to the collective".) (born 1979) is a Mi'kmaw writer, oral storyteller, director, drummer/singer, and ecologist.

== Career ==
Joudry's first book, a collection of poems titled, Generations Re-merging, was published by Gaspereau Press in 2014. Her poetry had previously appeared in "The Nashwaak Review" and "Mi'kmaq Anthology II". In August 2018, joudry's play Elapultiek premiered with Two Planks and a Passion Theatre in Kings County, Nova Scotia at the Ross Creek Centre for the Arts. Joudry played Nat opposite Matthew Lumley's Bill. The production subsequently toured four Indigenous communities in Nova Scotia. A second tour was carried out in the fall of 2019.

Joudry managed programs for species at risk and ecology for more than ten years. Her second published poetry collection, Waking Ground, was released in 2020 also by Gaspereau Press. In 2021, it was selected by the Writers' Trust of Canada as one of 25 books for the WT Amplified Voices program, which aims to amplify BIPOC voices in Canadian writing and promote works of BIPOC writers created during the COVID-19 pandemic. Waking Ground was shortlisted for numerous poetry awards in 2021.

Also in 2021, joudry's play KOQM, premiered at the King's Theatre in Annapolis Royal, starring joudry as all six characters. KOQM tells the 400-year story of Nova Scotia through the lives of L'nu (Mi'kmaw) women. It was subsequently staged by Neptune Theatre in Halifax and Ship's Company Theatre in Parrsborro as well as the Highland Arts Theatre in Cape Breton. KOQM was nominated for Best Production and won Best New Nova Scotian Play at the 2023 Robert Merritt Awards. In the summer of 2024 shalan toured an off-grid version of KOQM in Newfoundland as well as performing a run at Two Planks and a Passion Theatre in Ross Creek Centre for the Arts.

Joudry was named the Canadian Museum of Immigration at Pier 21's artist-in-residence in Halifax for 2023 . Her short film, welima’q, premiered at the 2024 Toronto International Film Festival as part of the Programme 01, Short Cuts. The four-minute film is her first and joudry was director and producer for the production.

== Works ==
=== Poetry ===
- Generations Re-merging (Gaspereau Press, 2014)
- Waking Ground (Gaspereau Press, 2020)

=== Plays ===
- Elapultiek (We Are Looking Towards) (Pottersfield Press, 2019)
- Mi'kmaq Stories: Past and Present (2020, co-created with Catherine Martin and Trevor Gould)
- Koqm (2021)
- Koqm - off grid (2024)
- Winter Moons - off grid (2023)
- Winter Moons musical theatre piece (2024)

=== Film/TV ===
- Welima'q (TIFF 2024 and AIFF 2024)
- Women of this Land
- Mi'kma'ki

== Awards ==
Year	Award	Category	Work	Result	Ref.
2021	Atlantic Book Awards	Maxine Tynes Poetry Award	Waking Ground	Nominated	
2021	Atlantic Book Awards	J.M. Abraham Poetry Award	Waking Ground	Nominated	
2021	Indigenous Voices Awards	Published Poetry in English	Waking Ground	Nominated	
2021	League of Canadian Poets Awards	Pat Lowther Memorial Award	Waking Ground	Nominated	
2023	Robert Merrit Awards	Best New Nova Scotian Play	Koqm	Won	

== Personal life ==
Joudry is from L’sɨtkuk (Bear River First Nation). She has two children and lives in Kespukwitk (southwest Nova Scotia) with her partner Frank Meuse. Joudry is a PhD candidate at Dalhousie University.
