= Peter Paul Toney Babey =

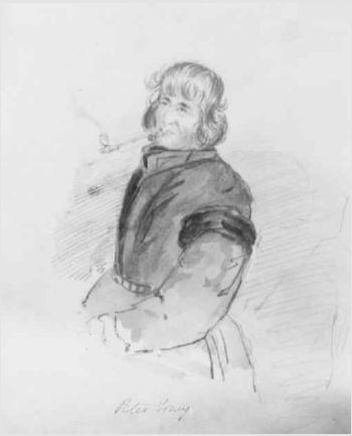
Peter Toney, Nova Scotia Museum

Peter Paul Toney Babey, (fl. 1849–1855) was a Mi'kmaw chief, also known as Peter Bobbeie, from Nova Scotia. He was born about 1800 and led a Mi'kmaw band living at Bear River.

The Mi'kmaq were struck by a famine in the mid-1840s and the Nova Scotia House of Assembly decided to pay their medical bills. This proved to be popular among the Mi'kmaq and an expensive undertaking for the government. Babey, who said he was a medicine man (doctor) with 25 years of experience, wanted compensation for his work among the population. This was in 1852 and, after a rather light hearted, facetious debate, the assembly did nothing. Again in 1855, Babey brought the medical plight of his people before the assembly with another petition. This time a sum of £4 was made available for his ministrations.

From that point, Babey appears in no more written records and, in 1857, the payment of Mi'kmaw medical bills was discontinued except in certain specific circumstances.
