= Osla Benning =

Canadian debutante (1921–1974)

Lady Henniker-Major
- Benning in March 1939
- Born: Margaret Osla Benning; 23 August 1921; Montreal, Quebec, Canada
- Died: 29 October 1974 (aged 53); Kensington, London, England
- Spouse: John Henniker-Major (m. 1946)
- Children: 3

Margaret Osla, Lady Henniker-Major (née Benning; 23 August 1921 – 29 October 1974) was a Canadian debutante, who worked at Bletchley Park, was Prince Philip's first girlfriend, and later married Sir John Henniker-Major (who became the 8th Baron Henniker after her death).

== Early life ==
Osla Benning was born in Montreal, Quebec, Canada, on 23 August 1921, the daughter of Edith Black and James William Benning, and the goddaughter of Lord Louis Mountbatten.

She went to finishing school in Austria, and came out as a debutante in August 1939. She was featured in Tatler magazine with a photograph caption reporting that she was being presented by Lady Beatty, as by this time her parents were divorced. Benning was described in her youth as having “dark hair, alabaster white skin, an exquisite figure and a gentle loving nature”.

== Prince Philip ==
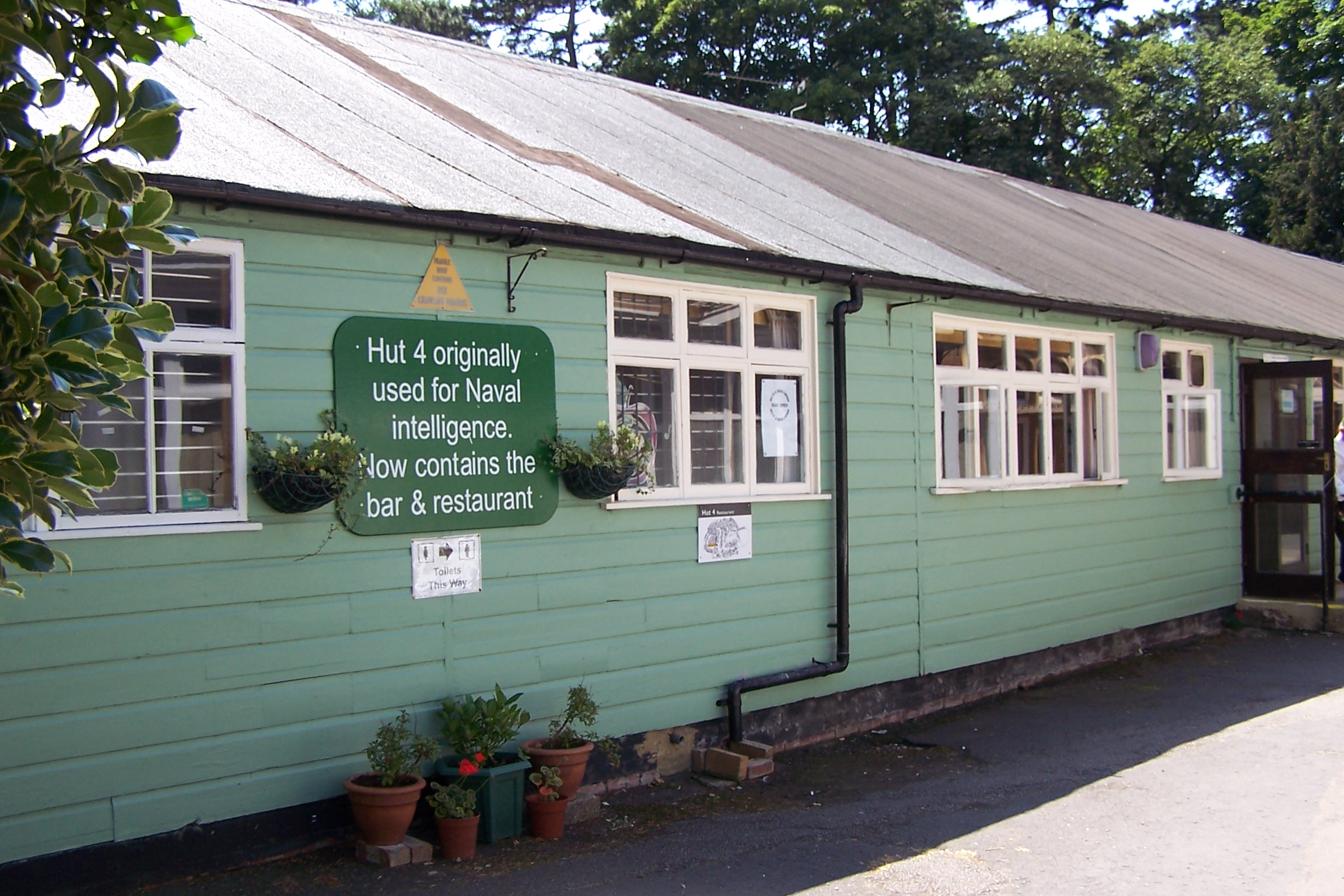
Hut 4, next to the mansion, used during the war for naval intelligence

Benning went to stay with her godfather Lord Louis Mountbatten, who mentioned to her friend (and fellow goddaughter) Sarah Baring that Prince Philip (Mountbatten's nephew) did not have a girlfriend and Baring acted as matchmaker.

Benning and the Prince were both 18 years old when they met. They had a romance, and according to Baring, "It was obvious that he was Osla's boyfriend in a simple, nice way, so to speak. Every time his ship came back, it was Osla he would ring". They exchanged letters while he was posted overseas, and he bought her a bejewelled brooch with a naval cipher.

"I do know that he was her first love," says her daughter, Jane Spring. "She never told me about him for years. She just said: 'I fell in love with a naval officer'." They later drifted apart.

== World War II and Bletchley Park ==
Early in the Second World War, Benning was sent to distant relations in Canada, but travelled back to England through Portugal. She and Baring went to build Hurricane fighter planes for the Royal Air Force at a Hawker Siddeley factory, close to Slough, and shared a cottage nearby. A few months later, by summer 1941, they were both tested on their German language skills and posted to Hut 4 at Bletchley Park, the naval section, as linguists. They were billeted together at the White Horse Inn.

At Bletchley, Benning was known as someone with a good sense of humour who liked to play practical jokes. Her Bletchley supervisor Pamela Rose described Benning as "a very pretty girl" who was "tremendous fun", "spoke German" and "had a lot of confidence." She also recalled that Benning and a friend would "catch the milk float from London to Bletchley at the crack of dawn and would do their shift in party dresses". Another story of Benning's time working at Bletchley claims that when Lord Mountbatten visited with senior military men, she exclaimed "Uncle Dickie, what are you doing here?"

Kate Quinn’s 2021 novel about Bletchley Park, The Rose Code features a character named Osla Kendall, who is based heavily on Osla Benning.

== Personal life ==
She was briefly engaged to Guy Millard, a British diplomat who later became Ambassador to Switzerland, but they did not marry.

She married John Patrick Edward Chandos Henniker-Major (later 8th Baron Henniker and Ambassador to Denmark) on 18 December 1946.

They had two sons and one daughter:

- Mark Ian Philip Chandos Henniker-Major, 9th Baron Henniker (born 29 September 1947), married Lesley Antoinette Foskett. Prince Philip was his godfather.
- Hon. Charles John Giles Henniker-Major (2 September 1949 – 9 May 2012), married Sally Kemp Newby.
- Hon. Jane Elizabeth Henniker-Major (born 6 July 1954).

Her husband was knighted in the 1965 New Years Honours List and succeeded as the 8th Baron Henniker in 1980.

== Death ==
Benning died of cancer in Kensington, London, on 29 October 1974, at the age of 53.
