= Linn Farrish =

US international rugby union player & alleged spy

Linn Markley Farrish
- Born: October 3, 1901
- Died: September 11, 1944 (aged 42) Balkans

Rugby union career
International career
Years	Team	Apps	(Points)
19??–19??	United States		
- Correct as of January 14, 2026
- Military career
- Allegiance: United States
- Branch: Office of Strategic Services
- Service years: 1941-44
- Conflicts: World War II; Yugoslavia
Medal record
Men's rugby union
Representing the United States
Olympic Games
Gold medal – first place	1924 Paris	Team competition

Linn Markley Farrish (October 3, 1901 – September 11, 1944) was an American rugby union player and alleged spy.

== Rugby ==
Farrish competed in the 1924 Summer Olympics. He was a member of the American rugby union team, which won the gold medal.

== Espionage ==
Farrish was a member of the Office of Strategic Services (OSS) during the Second World War. While acting as the OSS liaison officer to Josip Tito's Yugoslav Partisans, as part of Maclean Mission (Macmis), he submitted an assessment of anti-Nazi resistance. He was also allegedly serving Soviet intelligence. Farrish is referenced in the following Venona project decryption: 1397 KGB New York to Moscow, 4 October 1944. His code name in Soviet intelligence, as deciphered in the Venona project, was "Attila". He died in an aircraft crash in the Balkans in September 1944.

Biographer Mark Ryan states "Patriotic Farrish would never do anything to harm his beloved USA." Fitzroy Maclean jocularly referred to him in his memoir Eastern Approaches as "my American chief of staff". Farrish was also referred to as "Lawrence of Yugoslavia" (as was William M. Jones).

== Sources ==
- John Earl Haynes and Harvey Klehr, Venona: Decoding Soviet Espionage in America, Yale University Press (1999), pp. 194-195.
- M. Stanton Evans, Blacklisted by History: The Untold Story of Senator Joe McCarthy and His Fight Against America's Enemies, Random House (2007), pp. 95-97.
