= Bear River (Nova Scotia) =

Coordinates: 44.618°N 65.681°W

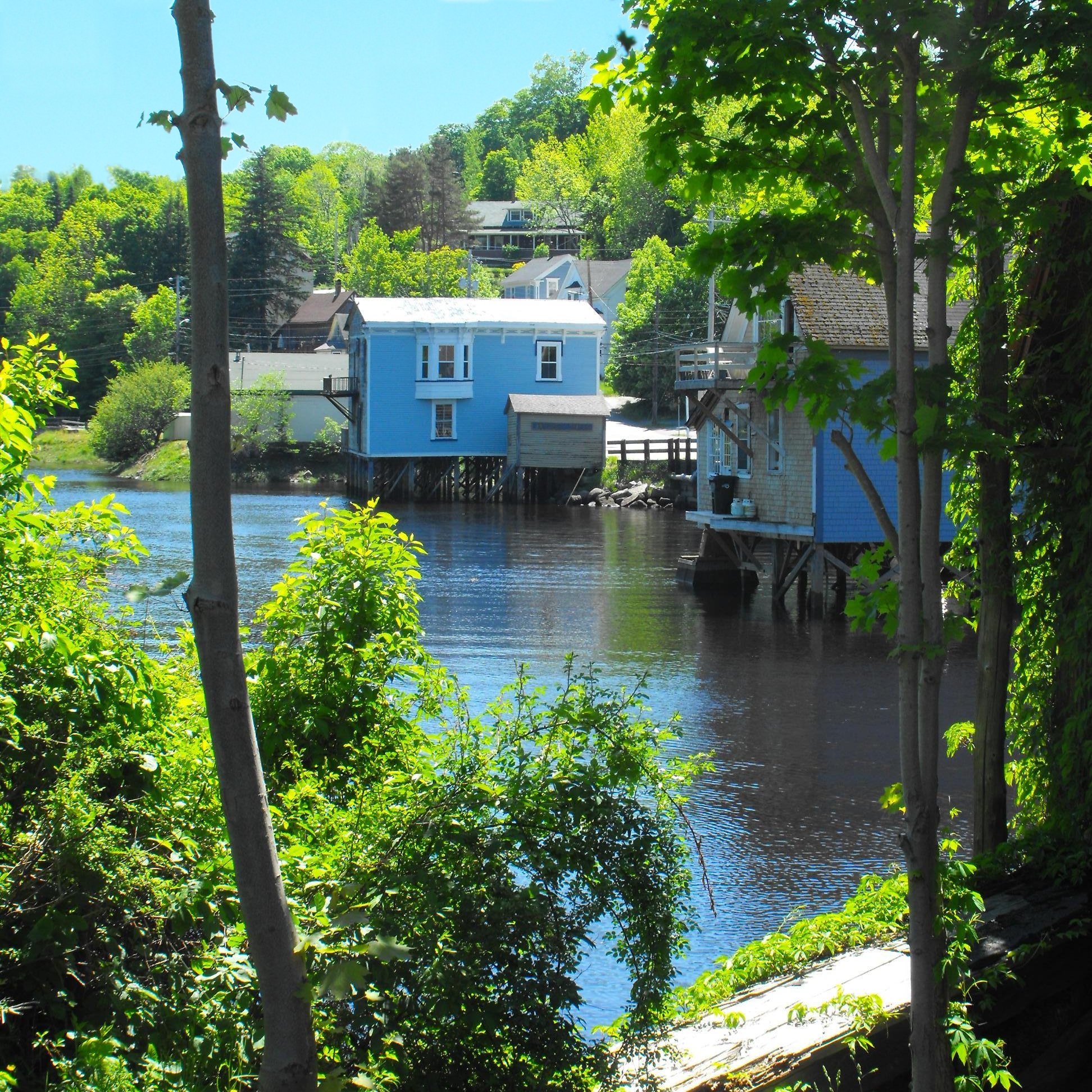
- Bear River, Nova Scotia

Location
- Country: Canada
- Province: Nova Scotia

Physical characteristics
- Mouth
  - location: Annapolis Basin
  - elevation: sea level
- Length: 40 km (25 mi)

The Bear River (Mi'kmaq: Ls'tgug) is a minor river in western Nova Scotia, Canada. Flowing from south to north, it is 40 kilometres (25 mi) long from its headwaters to its discharge into the Annapolis Basin, some 6 kilometres (3.7 mi) east of Digby. The river is tidal for the last 9.7 kilometres (6.0 mi) of its length. The community of Bear River (which today calls itself "The Tidal Village") is situated near the head of the tide where shipbuilding took place in the nineteenth century.

The river lies within an area long-occupied by native Mi'kmaq people, embodied today by members of the Bear River First Nation who still reside on the river. The native name for the river is L'sitkuk, (pronounced "elsetkook"). The area was settled by European settlers at nearby habitation at Port Royal at the start of the seventeenth century. Samuel de Champlain called it Rivière St. Antoine (St. Anthony's River) on his first map, but the name did not survive. In 1609 it appeared as Rivière Hébert (probably for Louis Hébert) on Lescarbot's map and the name held. It was altered following English occupation of the region probably in the late eighteenth century.

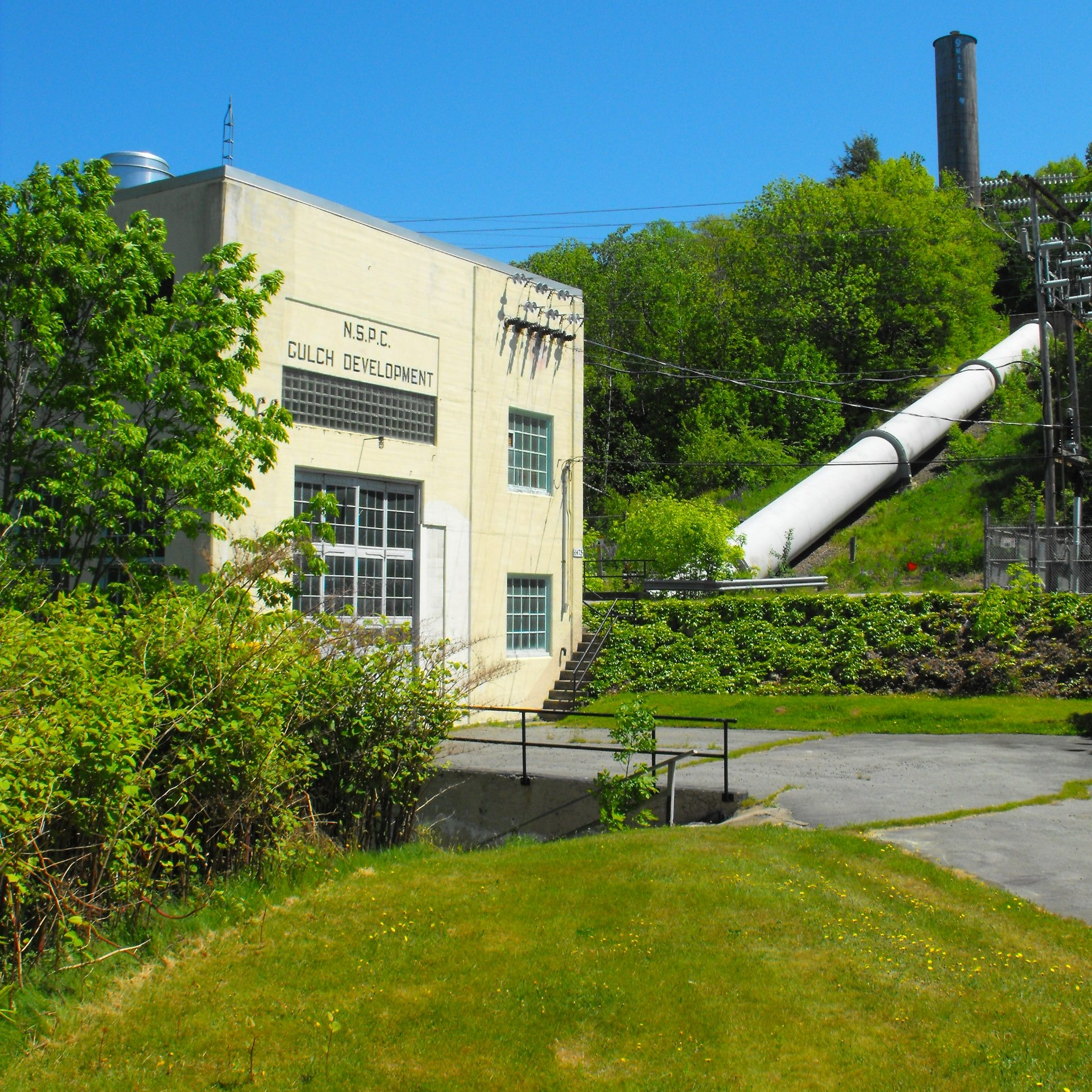
Gulch Power Station

The river forms part of the boundary between Annapolis and Digby Counties. The steep forested slopes and natural environment, particularly in the lower reaches, have led to the nickname "The Switzerland of Nova Scotia" being applied to the river valley area. The deeply cut valley, hewn from the contact between slate bedrock on the west and granite on the east, is a drowned river valley of which Digby Gut on the Bay of Fundy forms the northern extreme.

The river is fed by several streams but even so, at low tide the mud flats, grasses and reeds are very visible. However, at high tide, the salt water from the basin flows in and fills the river to a height of up to 26 feet. There are two main tributaries which converge at the tide head, known as the East and West branches, and five smaller tributaries. The West Branch is now also called the Franklin River. The East Branch lies almost entirely within Annapolis County. The East Branch was once well known as a salmon river. One of the lakes in the watershed, now called Charlotte Lake, was at one time known as Salmon Lake. The East Branch flows out of a granite upland plateau about 7.2 kilometres (4.5 mi) south east of Mulgrave Lake, (formerly Big Lake and East Bear River Lake). The East Branch flows about 21.7 kilometres (13.5 mi) to its confluence with the West Branch. Beginning around 1950, hydroelectric power has been produced by impounding water in the upper watershed. Mulgrave Lake has been dammed and two additional dams now form head ponds for the Gulch Power Station in Bear River. Franklin River (Bear River West Branch) has its source at Lake Franklin located about 16 kilometres (9.9 mi) southeast of the village. The 4 kilometres (2.5 mi) long Lake Jolly is situated along the river course.

== Bridges ==
In addition to the railway bridge, built in 1912 and demolished in late 2011, there are two primary highway bridges which span the Bear River. The longest is the Bear River Bridge located on Highway 101 at the mouth of the river (which drains into the Annapolis Basin), approximately 6 km from the community. The second is located in downtown Bear River and connects the two halves of the village together. There are several shorter bridges further inland.

== See also ==
- List of rivers of Nova Scotia
