= William M. Jones =

WWI and WWII Canadian soldier

Major William M. Jones
- Nickname: Lawrence of Yugoslavia
- Born: August 23, 1895; Bear River, Nova Scotia, Canada
- Died: September 1, 1969 (aged 74) Dunnville, Ontario, Canada
- Allegiance: Canada
- Rank: Major
- Conflicts: World War I; World War II
- Awards: Distinguished Conduct Medal with Bar

Major William M. Jones (August 23, 1895 – 1969) was a Canadian soldier of World War I and World War II who served with distinction with the Yugoslav Partisans.

== Biography ==
Jones was born in Bear River, Nova Scotia. His code name was "Lawrence of Yugoslavia" (a term also used to describe Linn Farrish). In World War I, Jones was wounded three times, losing one eye, for which he was awarded the Distinguished Conduct Medal with Bar. During the Second World War, Major William M. Jones spent 12 months with the Yugoslav Partisans. On 19 May 1943, he parachuted into Yugoslavia to become an Allied representative to Marshal Josip Broz Tito. He features in Eastern Approaches, the first memoirs of Fitzroy Maclean. Jones died in Dunnville, Ontario on September 1, 1969.

== See also ==
- Military history of Nova Scotia
