= Vivian Street (British Army officer) =

British Army general

Major-General Vivian Street CMG CBE DSO MC JP
- Born: 1912
- Died: 4 April 1970 (aged 57−58)
- Spouse: Annette Mary Lever
- Military career
- Allegiance: United Kingdom
- Branch: British Army
- Service years: 1932–1963
- Rank: Major-General
- Service number: 53698
- Units: Devonshire Regiment; Rifle Brigade (The Prince Consort's Own)
- Commands: Parachute Brigade of the Territorial Army; 3rd Division
- Conflicts: World War II; Arab revolt in Palestine
- Awards: Companion of the Order of St Michael and St George; Commander of the Order of the British Empire; Distinguished Service Order; Military Cross

Major-General Vivian Wakefield Street CMG CBE DSO MC JP (1912 – 4 April 1970) was a British Army officer who commanded the 3rd Infantry Division for a period during the 1960s.

== Military career ==
Educated at Wellington College, Berkshire, and the Royal Military College, Sandhurst, Street was commissioned into the Devonshire Regiment in 1932. He served as an intelligence officer with the 14th Infantry Brigade in Palestine during the Arab revolt in 1938 for which tour he received the MC. He also served in the Second World War as a general staff officer before becoming the officer in charge of the beach at Port Raphtis during Allied evacuation of Greece in 1941. After that he served with the 1st Special Air Service Regiment and carried out raids behind enemy lines in North Africa before being captured by the Italians and then escaping from a torpedoed Italian submarine. In 1944 he was made second-in-command of the Maclean Mission to Yugoslavia.

He was appointed commander of the parachute brigade of the Territorial Army in 1954, deputy director of staff duties at the War Office in 1956 and military adviser to the King of Jordan in 1959. He went on to be general officer commanding 3rd Division in 1961 before retiring in 1963.

In retirement he became chairman of the Save the Children Fund. He was also appeal director of the British Cardiac Society.

== Family ==
Street was married to Annette Mary Lever Crean in 1945.

Military offices
Preceded by Charles Harington	GOC 3rd Division; 1961−1962	Succeeded by Michael Carver
