= Bear River 6 =

Coordinates: 44.575°N 65.640°W

Location of Bear River 6 in Nova Scotia

Bear River 6 is a 649-hectare (1,600-acre) Mi'kmaq reserve located in Annapolis County and Digby County, Nova Scotia. It had a population of 138 individuals in 2016, an increase of 35.3% compared to 2011.

It is administratively part of the Bear River First Nation.
