= John B. Selby =

British World War II fighter pilot (1915–1991)

Wing commander John Beauchamp Selby DSO, DFC
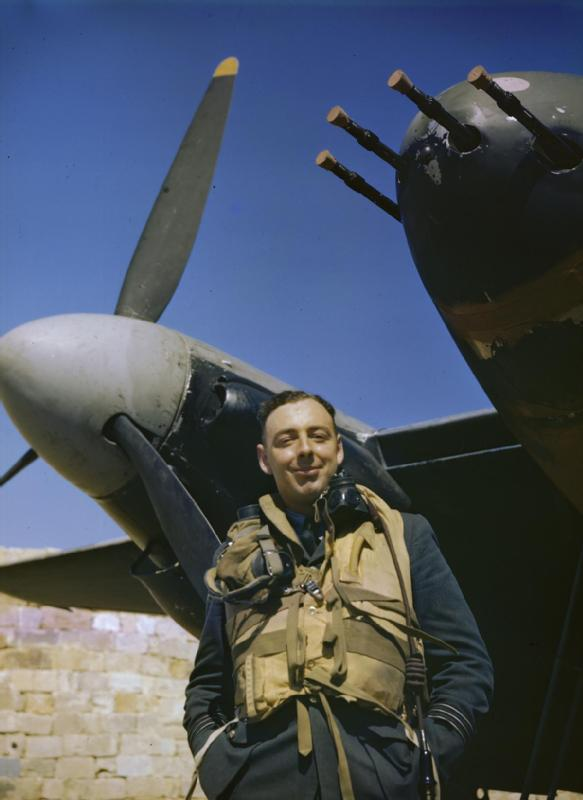
- Selby beside his de Havilland Mosquito II, June 1943
- Born: 19 March 1915; London
- Died: 17 February 1991 (aged 75)
- Military career
- Allegiance: United Kingdom
- Branch: Royal Air Force
- Service years: 1940–1947
- Rank: Wing commander
- Nickname: Dogsbody
- Service number: 88705
- Commands: No. 73 Squadron; No. 23 Squadron
- Conflicts: Second World War: Western Desert Campaign; Italian Campaign
- Awards: Distinguished Service Order; Distinguished Flying Cross

Wing Commander John Beauchamp Selby, DSO, DFC (19 March 1915 – 17 February 1991) was a Royal Air Force flying ace during the Second World War. He was credited with 5 aerial victories.

== Early life ==
Selby was born in London on 19 March 1915. He attended the Oratory School in Berkshire. Prior to the Second World War he worked in a number of professions including in advertising, broadcasting and also concert performance.

== Second World War service ==
In early 1942 he was serving with No. 73 Squadron flying Hawker Hurricanes. He scored his first aerial victory on the night of 25/26 May 1942 against a Regia Aeronautica Fiat CR.42, one of nine attacking RAF Gambut airfield as part of a series of attacks by Italian and German aircraft on Allied air bases in advance of the Battle of Gazala. He was credited with a Junkers Ju 88 bomber damaged over Gambut on 27 May, and on 8 June, during the Battle of Bir Hakeim, claimed a German Messerschmitt Bf 109 shot down over the besieged oasis. Selby claimed a Ju 88 shot down north of Fouka, Egypt on the night of 27/28 June 1942. On 3 July, during the First Battle of El Alamein, he claimed a Junkers Ju 87 damaged and on 7 July, a CR.42 shot down. On 10 July, in a battle between 11 Hurricanes of 73 Squadron and five CR.42s and their escort of four Bf 109s, Selby's Hurricane was hit and he made a forced landing. He claimed an enemy aircraft damaged during a night intruder mission to Maaten Bagush on the night of 7/8 September 1942.

Selby was promoted to Squadron leader in October 1942, taking over command of 73 Squadron on 1 October. He was awarded the Distinguished Flying Cross in October 1942, and the Distinguished Service Order in February 1943.

From February to April 1943 he was on leave and during this time he assisted Fitzroy Maclean in supply missions to the Yugoslav Partisans.

In April 1943 Selby was promoted to wing commander, taking over command of No. 23 Squadron at RAF Luqa, Malta equipped with the de Havilland Mosquito on 25 April. The squadron was employed on intruder and ground attack duties, but had suffered heavy losses over the previous few months. On the night of 20/21 July 1943 he claimed his 5th aerial victory, a Heinkel He 111 shot down near Lecce in southern Italy, attaining flying ace status. He remained in command of 23 Squadron until 5 September 1943.

== Post war ==
Following his retirement from the RAF in 1947, Selby worked for a time with the BBC's overseas service. He also ran his own business in Rome, worked in the City of London as well as the Middle East and Geneva. He retired in 1978 and moved to Vence in Alpes Maritime, where he died on 17 February 1991. He was married with two children.
