= Robin Whetherly =

English cricketer and soldier

Personal information
- Full name: Robin Evelyn Whetherly
- Born: 23 July 1916; Westminster, London, England
- Died: 27 November 1943 (aged 27); Glamoc Airfield, near Glamoč, German-occupied Yugoslavia
- Batting: Right-handed
- Role: Wicketkeeper

Domestic team information
- Years: Team
- 1937–1938: Oxford University

Career statistics
Competition	First-class
Matches	11
Runs scored	146
Batting average	12.16
100s/50s	0/1
Top score	63
Catches/stumpings	20/6
- Source: Cricinfo, 29 November 2014

Robin Evelyn Whetherly MC (23 July 1916 – 27 November 1943) was an English first-class cricketer and soldier who died in action in World War II.

The son of Lieutenant Colonel William Stobart Whetherly, a decorated veteran of the Boer War and World War I, Whetherly was educated at Harrow School, where he kept wicket for the first XI in his final year, 1935, before going up to Magdalen College, Oxford, to read history.

He played several matches as a wicket-keeper for Oxford University in 1937 and 1938, but was overlooked for the annual match against Cambridge University in favour of Michael Matthews in 1937 and Roger Kimpton in 1938. He usually batted in the lower order, his only innings of more than 22 coming in the match against Marylebone Cricket Club (MCC) at Lord's in 1937 when he batted at number four and made 63, adding 132 for the third wicket with Mandy Mitchell-Innes.

After working for a travel agency, Whetherly accepted a commission in the 1st King's Dragoon Guards on the outbreak of World War II. He served in Libya, where in April 1941 his regiment was attacked by the Afrika Korps. For his actions during the battle, in which he saved many of his men from capture, he was awarded the Military Cross. He continued to serve in North Africa until 1943, when he joined the Special Operations Executive, and parachuted into Yugoslavia to serve as part of Macmis under Fitzroy Maclean, in assisting the Yugoslav Partisans. He died at Glamoc Airfield near Glamoč in November 1943 while on a Dornier Do 17 piloted by Croatian Air Force defectors. The plane was strafed with bombs and machine-guns by a Heinkel He 46, and Whetherly was killed by a bomb strike that hit while he and others were climbing out of the Dornier.
