= John Henniker-Major, 8th Baron Henniker =

British peer, civil servant, and diplomat (1916–2004)

The Right Honourable The Lord Henniker KCMG CVO MC

British Ambassador to Denmark
- In office 1962–1966
- Preceded by: Sir William Montagu-Pollock
- Succeeded by: Oliver Wright

British Ambassador to Jordan
- In office 1960–1962
- Preceded by: Sir Charles Johnston
- Succeeded by: Sir Roderick Parkes

Personal details
- Born: 19 February 1916
- Died: 29 April 2004 (aged 88)
- Spouse(s): Osla Benning (m. 1946; died 1974) Julia Poland (m. 1976)
- Children: 3
- Education: Trinity College, Cambridge
- Occupation: Civil servant and diplomat
- Awards: Military Cross

Military service
- Allegiance: United Kingdom
- Branch/service: British Army
- Years of service: 1939–1945
- Rank: Major
- Unit: Rifle Brigade
- Battles/wars: Second World War

John Patrick Edward Chandos Henniker-Major, 8th Baron Henniker KCMG CVO MC (19 February 1916 – 29 April 2004), known as Sir John Henniker-Major from 1965 to 1980, was a British peer, civil servant, and diplomat.

== Early life and military service ==
Henniker was the eldest son of John Ernest de Grey Henniker-Major, 7th Baron Henniker, and Molly Burnet. He was educated at Stowe and Trinity College, Cambridge, where he gained a First in Modern Languages. He entered the Foreign Office in 1938, completing the entrance examinations at the top of his intake. He was appointed Third Secretary that year. Following the outbreak of the Second World War, Henniker was released for military service. He was commissioned as an officer into the Rifle Brigade, eventually rising to the rank of Major. During the war he served in the Western Desert campaign, being wounded in Libya and hospitalised in Cairo. In 1943 he joined Fitzroy Maclean's mission in Yugoslavia (Macmis) whilst on secondment to the Special Operations Executive and appointed as a British Liaison Officer (BLO) to Koča Popović, the most prominent Partisan commander. In August 1944, the three men agreed the scope and tactics of the Operation Ratweek in central Serbia, which severely damaged German ambitions to withdraw troops from Greece and the southern Balkans. In 1945 he was awarded the Military Cross.

== Diplomatic and later career ==
After the war he returned to the diplomatic service and served at the British Embassy in Belgrade from 1945 to 1946, as Assistant Private Secretary to the Foreign Secretary Ernest Bevin from 1946 to 1948, at the Foreign Office from 1948 to 1950 and at the British Embassy in Buenos Aires from 1950 to 1952. From 1953 to 1960 he was Head of the Personnel Department at the Foreign Office.

In 1960 Henniker was appointed Ambassador to Jordan, a post he held until 1962, and was then Ambassador to Denmark from 1962 to 1966. He served as Assistant Under-Secretary of State from 1966 to 1967 but declined the ambassadorships to Brazil and the Republic of Ireland as he wanted to stay in England. In 1968 he became Director-General of the British Council, which he remained until 1972, before being invited to resign by Lord Fulton on the pretext of his wife's failing health. Henniker devoted the later part of his life to charitable causes, especially in Suffolk where his family had their ancestral seat.

In 1980 he succeeded as eighth Baron Henniker on the death of his 97-year-old father and assumed his seat in the House of Lords. In the Lords, he sat on the Social Democratic Party (SDP) benches, having joined the party upon its foundation in 1981, and following its demise he briefly served as a spokesman for the Liberal Democrats. He was made a Companion of the Order of St Michael and St George (CMG) in the 1956 Birthday Honours, a Commander of the Royal Victorian Order (CVO) in 1960 and knighted a KCMG in 1965 New Year Honours.

== Family ==
John Henniker-Major married Osla Benning in 1946. They had three children:

- Mark Ian Philip Chandos Henniker-Major, 9th Baron Henniker (born 29 September 1947), married Lesley Antoinette Foskett
- Hon. Charles John Giles Henniker-Major (2 September 1949 – 9 May 2012), married Sally Kemp Newby
- Hon. Jane Elizabeth Henniker-Major (born 6 July 1954), married Richard Spring, Baron Risby

After his first wife's death in 1974 he married Julia Poland (née Mason) in 1976. He died in April 2004, aged 88, and was succeeded in his titles by his eldest son, Mark.

== Arms ==
Coat of arms of John Henniker-Major, 8th Baron Henniker
Crest 1st: a Dexter Arm embowed habited Azure cuffed Argent and charged on the elbow with a Plate the Hand proper holding a Baton Or (Major); 2nd: an Escallop Or charged with an Estoile Gules (Henniker) Escutcheon Quarterly: 1st and 4th, Azure three Corinthian Columns two and one palewise Or each having on the capital a Golden Ball (Major); 2nd and 3rd, Or on a Chevron Gules between two Crescents in chief and an Escallop in base Azure three Estoiles Argent (Henniker) Supporters Dexter: a Stag Argent attired and unguled Or gorged with a Chaplet of Oak proper fructed Gold and pendent therefrom an Escutcheon Azure charged with the Crest of Henniker; Sinister: an Otter Argent gorged with a Ducal Coronet Or and pendent therefrom an Escutcheon of the Arms of Major Motto Deus Major Columna (God the greater support)

== Notes ==
Diplomatic posts
Preceded by Sir Charles Johnston	British Ambassador to Jordan; 1960–1962	Succeeded by Sir Roderick Parkes
Preceded by William Montagu-Pollock	British Ambassador to Denmark; 1962–1966	Succeeded by Oliver Wright
Peerage of Ireland
Preceded by John Henniker-Major	Baron Henniker; 1980–2004	Succeeded by Mark Major-Henniker
Peerage of the United Kingdom
Preceded by John Henniker-Major	Baron Hartismere; 1980–2004	Succeeded by Mark Henniker-Major
