= Bear River 6B =

Coordinates: 44.7133°N 65.4944°W

Location of Bear River 6B in Nova Scotia

Bear River 6B is a 24.3ha Mi'kmaq reserve located in Annapolis County, Nova Scotia. It has a population of 16 in 2016.

It is administratively part of the Bear River First Nation.
