= Bear River 6A =

Coordinates: 44.6683°N 65.47805°W

Location of Bear River 6A in Nova Scotia

Bear River 6A is a 31.2ha Mi'kmaq reserve located in Annapolis County, Nova Scotia. It is administratively part of the Bear River First Nation.
