= Ralph Stevenson =

British diplomat (1895–1977)

Sir Ralph Stevenson GCMG MLC
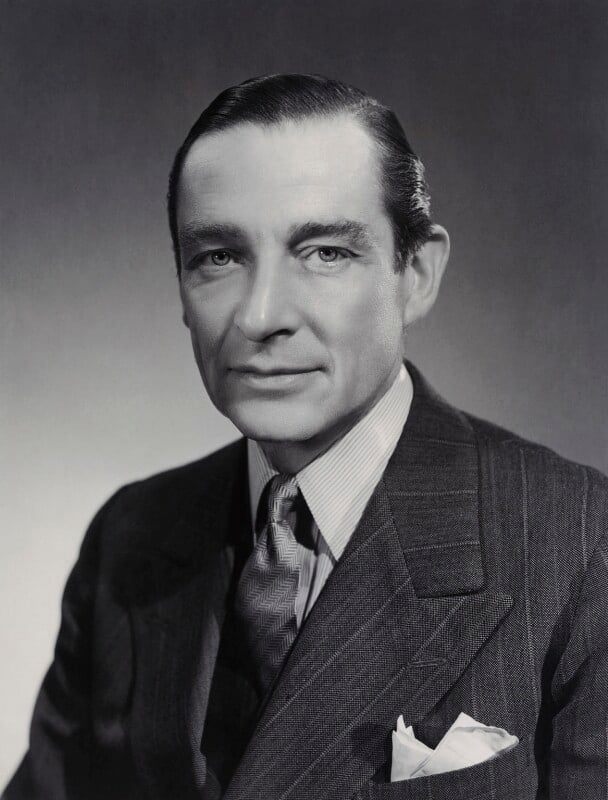
- Stevenson in 1946

British Ambassador to Egypt
- In office 1950–1955

British Ambassador to the Republic of China
- In office 1946–1950

Envoy Extraordinary and Minister Plenipotentiary to the Kingdom of Yugoslavia
- In office 1943-1946

Principal Private Secretary to the Foreign Secretary
- In office 1939-1941

Personal details
- Born: Ralph Clarmont Skrine Stevenson; 16 May 1895
- Died: 23 June 1977 (aged 82)
- Spouse: Helen Boreel (m. 1921; div. 1944)
- Children: 1
- Education: University College, Oxford
- Military career
- Rank: Captain
- Unit: Rifle Brigade
- Conflicts: World War I

Sir Ralph Clarmont Skrine Stevenson, GCMG, MLC, CP (16 May 1895 – 23 June 1977) was a British diplomat.

== Biography ==
He was the son of Surgeon-General, H.W. Stevenson and was educated at Wellington College and University College, Oxford. He married Helen Barbara Izabel Boreel on 27 October 1921 and they had one son and divorced in 1944. He had served in the Rifle Brigade during the First World War, becoming Captain in 1917. His diplomatic career began as 3rd Secretary to the Diplomatic Service in 1919; 2nd Secretary in 1921 and 1st Secretary in 1928. Moving through positions of acting Counselor (1937); Counselor (1938) he became Minister in 1941. During this period he served with the Foreign Office in missions at Copenhagen, Berlin, Sofia, The Hague, Cairo and Barcelona.

In 1943, he was appointed Ambassador to the Kingdom of Yugoslavia, a post he held until 1946. He was the British Ambassador to China from 1946 to 1950. Stevenson was Ambassador to the Kingdom of Egypt from 1950 to 1953 and later on to the Republic of Egypt from 1953 to 1955. He was also a member of the Legislative Council of the Isle of Man from 1955 to 1970, as well as Captain of the Parish of Arbory from 1963 to 1976.

Diplomatic posts
Preceded by Oliver Harvey	Principal Private Secretary to the Foreign Secretary; 1939-1941	Succeeded by Oliver Harvey (again)
Preceded by George William Rendel	Envoy Extraordinary and Minister Plenipotentiary to the Kingdom of Yugoslavia; 1943 – 1946	Succeeded by Charles Brinsley Pemberton Peake
Preceded by Sir Horace James Seymour	British Ambassador to the Republic of China; 1946–1950	Vacant Recognition of the People's Republic of China Title next held by Humphrey Trevelyan as Chargé d'affaires ad interim
Preceded by Sir Ronald Campbell	British Ambassador to Egypt; 1950–1955	Succeeded by Humphrey Trevelyan
