= Zadvarje =

Municipality in Split-Dalmatia County, Croatia

- Municipality
- Interactive map of Zadvarje
- Location of Zadvarje in Croatia
- Coordinates: 43°26′N 16°53′E
- Country: Croatia
- Region: Dalmatia
- County: Split-Dalmatia County

Area
  - Municipality: 13.0 km^{2} (5.0 sq mi)
  - Urban: 10.9 km^{2} (4.2 sq mi)

Population (2021)
  - Municipality: 289
  - Density: 22.2/km^{2} (57.6/sq mi)
  - Urban: 289
  - Urban density: 26.5/km^{2} (68.7/sq mi)
- Website: zadvarje.hr

Zadvarje is a village and a municipality in the Split-Dalmatia County, Croatia. It has a population of 289 (2011 census), 99.3% of which are Croats. The only settlement in Zadvarje municipality is Zadvarje itself.

== Demographics ==
Zadvarje: Population trends 1857–2021
v

population	371		455	233	543	695	803	920	744	719	597	431	317	292	277	289	289
	1857	1869	1880	1890	1900	1910	1921	1931	1948	1953	1961	1971	1981	1991	2001	2011	2021

Sources: Croatian Bureau of Statistics publications
