= Terence Atherton =

British espionage agent and journalist

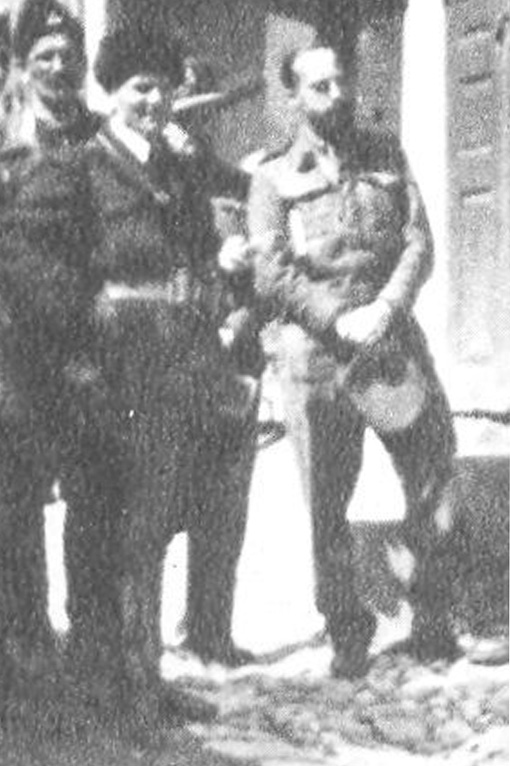
- Atherton (on the right with pipe) alongside Josip Broz Tito during February 1942 in Foča
- Born: 3 August 1902; Wavertree, Liverpool, England
- Died: 15 July 1942 (aged 39); Tatarovina, Italian-occupied Montenegro
- Military career
- Allegiance: United Kingdom
- Branch: Special Operations Executive (SOE)
- Rank: Major
- Unit: General Service Corps
- Conflicts: Operation Hydra (Yugoslavia)

Arthur Terence Atherton (3 August 1902 – 15 July 1942) was a British journalist, War correspondent and a newspaper proprietor of various English language publications in Belgrade between 1931 and 1941. He was also a British Special Operations Executive intelligence officer for Section D and an espionage agent, both in pre-war Belgrade and during World War II in Yugoslavia. The former journalist led a Commando Mission behind enemy lines during World War II and died in mysterious circumstances.

== Early life ==
He was the son of Douglas Harold Atherton (1861-1924) and Letitia Elizabeth Haigh (1861-1933). His parents married in Lindley, North Yorkshire on 24 November 1887. He was born in Wavertree, Liverpool, and had 3 elder siblings. His paternal ancestors were gentlemen farmers and his maternal grandfather was a solicitor.

== Career ==
From 1919, Atherton was employed by the Bank of Liverpool and Martins as a bank clerk. He enlisted within the Royal Air Force on 27 November 1925. He joined the service as an aircraftman second class (AC2), and would have performed air mechanical duties. He left the service after less than 280 days.

Atherton went on to become a leading British journalist in Belgrade, Kingdom of Yugoslavia where he remained for a number of years. It is a mystery how within 5 years he became a foreign correspondent in a European capital city. It is possible that Atherton was residing in Yugoslavia prior to 1930. He was the Belgrade correspondent for The Daily Mail and the Daily Dispatch for ten years. He traveled extensively throughout Yugoslavia and Bulgaria, and was fluent in Serbo-Croatian. He was also the chief editor and founder of the South Slav Herald in Belgrade in 1931, and owner and publisher of the Balkan Herald founded in 1934. His assistant editor was Alexander Simić-Stevens who had also been the Belgrade Correspondent for the Evening Standard and The Star.

Atherton was an intelligence agent for Section D of the British Special Operations Executive in pre-war Belgrade. His cover was a journalist and newspaperman. His assistant editor was also a member of SOE. Atherton married a Yugoslavian National from Sarajevo, Bosnia, of Muslim faith.

By 1934, his articles on a Yugoslavian perspective were being published around the world. He reported on Princess Marina of Greece and Denmark’s engagement to Prince George, Duke of Kent and their gift from Alexander I of Yugoslavia, just one month before the King of Yugoslavia was assassinated in Marseille whilst on a state visit to France.

Atherton, whilst correspondent for the Daily Mail and editor of the Balkan Herald was based at Dobrašina 12, Belgrade, and would write to editors of London papers with anecdotes of life in the Balkan city. On 25 November 1935, Atherton reported to the Editor of The Times of London of the donation of animals from Tierpark Hagenbeck to Prince Paul of Yugoslavia. Whereas the Mayor of Belgrade, Vlada Ilić appealed to the United Kingdom for gifts of specimens, preferably in pairs, for a much anticipated Belgrade Zoo. These stories and many others by Atherton are both intriguing and insightful reports during the inter-war period. Atherton’s journalistic approach to another editor, under the banner of either "Points from Letters" or "Letters to Editor" became more frequent leading up to the German invasion with titles like "Wolves of the Balkans" on 3 March 1937, and therefore each of these letters may contain a hidden message. Alexander Simić-Stevens, who Atherton tutored returned to London and subsequently joined SOE.

The following year, the German annexation of Austria gave Yugoslavia a common border with Nazi Germany. Atherton continued in Yugoslavia after the country declared itself neutral at the outbreak of the World War II, writing about a dangerous level of plentiful food in the Balkan countries during December 1939, in comparison to that in Nazi Germany.

During March 1940, Atherton returned to writing about royalty. His articles were published around the world. He reported on a wedding talking place in Belgrade between Prince Nicholas Wladimirovitch Orloff, (who divorced Princess Nadejda Petrovna of Russia the previous week), and an American actress, successful only in Germany, Mary R. Shuck went by the stage name of Marina Marshall. The Russian noble had been close to Nazi-Germany, and only left Berlin because of the Molotov–Ribbentrop Pact. When he eventually emigrated to the United States he was suspected by U.S. agencies as being Lord Haw-Haw, as he was responsible for broadcasting Nazi Propaganda in English over the airwaves before the war. The article refers to the nobleman's admiration of George Bernard Shaw, who at the time admired Mussolini and Stalin. Atherton's article is likely to contain a coded message.

Atherton went to Greece to cover how the Metaxas Regime were combating the Italian incursions from Albania during November 1940 in what became known as the Greco-Italian War. Atherton remained just three days at the front before returning to Bitola, previously known as Monastir.

Atherton was in-country when the Yugoslav prince regent yielded to pressure from Germany and declared the Yugoslav accession to the Tripartite Pact on 25 March 1941. However a pro-British coup d'état deposed the regent and declared Peter II of Yugoslavia as the new king, two days later. This event was encouraged by SOE, however the level of Atherton's involvement is unknown, since he effectively lead a double life.

The SOE office in Belgrade that Atherton was attached to, had gone to significant lengths to support the opposition to the Dragiša Cvetković government, which antagonised and undermined the hard-won balance in Yugoslav politics that Cvetković's short lived government represented. SOE Belgrade was entangled with pro-Serb policies and interests, and disregarded, or underestimated warnings from SOE Zagreb and British diplomats in that city, who may have been able to provide a clearer analysis of the challenges of a politically complex country, at the time dealing with diverse ethnicities, religious sensitivities and shifting politic allegiances. However rivalries and confusion and lack of continued interest by the British Foreign Office in this region of Europe did little to help matters of diplomacy in Atherton's adoptive home. The level of Atherton's role and involvement with SOE HQ in Belgrade is unknown; however given that he was allegedly married to a Bosnian Muslim, proves that he was less "Belgrade centric", and therefore may have not been so favourable to Serb desire for supremacy over the Croats, Slovenes and Muslims under his watch.

The German bombing of Belgrade, which commenced during the early hours of 6 April 1941, and lasted three days, killing 17,000 people, was known as Operation Punishment. Atherton was forced to leave his adoptive city on the second day, his home for over 10 years, with retreating Yugoslav forces, as Axis forces had entered the country and closing in on the capital. His mission was to remain close to Yugoslav leaders until the armistice, evade capture by Axis-forces, and exit the country by any means and reach British troops in Greece.

== Axis invasion and escape from the Kingdom of Yugoslavia ==
Atherton successfully escaped from Yugoslavia after the invasion by Axis forces in April 1941, teaming up with 3 American foreign correspondents; Robert St. John (1902-2003) from Chicago, a writer for the Associated Press; Leigh White (1914-1968) from Vermont, a writer for the New York Post and the Columbia Broadcasting System; and Russell Hill of The New York Herald Tribune, on a 700-mile journey to Greece using multiple means of transport. He and 2 of his companions, St. John and Hill, arrived in Alexandria, a month later, with White remaining in hospital in Greece.

In order to evacuate from Belgrade, Atherton acquired a car (a small blue Opel coach) and drove first to Banja Koviljača and then onto Užice and to Zvornik following the retreating Yugoslav government. Atherton would later write that he was in the presence of the new Prime Minister, General Dušan Simović, as he witnessed "first hand", the collapse of the government of national unity, from a small town in Bosnia, within less than 10 days. Atherton later revealed in his articles as a war correspondent, that from the moment the Yugoslav government offices in Belgrade were destroyed in air raids, the only means of communication for Simovic with the Royal Yugoslav Army and other forces, was by using a small British radio.

SOE's priority was to assist in ensuring Peter II of Yugoslavia escaped on a plane to Greece before the unconditional surrender. Atherton, realizing the severity of his own situation, and of his American companions, continued overland onto Cetinje, and then onto the coastal port of Budva in Montenegro as an Italian occupation force began entering the ancient walled town.

The invasion of Yugoslavia ended when an armistice was signed on 17 April 1941, which came into effect at noon on 18 April. Shortly prior to this date, in Budva, Atherton seized a small sardine boat, in exchange of his Opel car, and remained hidden in the port until it was safe to leave. With no charts or a compass; only 12 gallons of fuel, some road maps, and a gunny sack of bread, Atherton set off with his 3 companions on a dangerous voyage through Albanian coastal waters, a region subject to invasion and now in control of the Italian forces, in an attempt to safely reach the Greek island of Corfu.

His traveling companion, St John was the only experienced sailor, who later recounted the tale of treacherous weather conditions and the groups imminent danger when an Italian Navy vessel accompanying troop movement ships spotted their small open boat, and subsequently trained their guns on them in proximity to Durrës. St. John and the others placed a bloodstained American flag so that it was visible; and after several tense minutes, they were eventually waved on. This quick thinking by one of the Americans may have saved Atherton from being detained by the Italian Navy, since as a Briton, he was considered to be an enemy national.

The voyage south coincided with the German invasion of Greece. Having reached Corfu, the Greek naval authorities were initially dubious such a trip was even possible, given the recent weather conditions. The authorities had more pressing matters than 4 journalists in a sardine boat. Eventually the local authorities permitted them to sail south, where they were subsequently machine gunned by Italian fighter planes, and their vessel quickly sank. Atherton and his companions were rescued by a small Greek fishing trawler, which also fell victim to an air attack; this time by 5 Stukageschwader Stuka dive bombers, and suffered fatalities. During this incident Atherton was wounded in a knee and White's femur was shattered.

Once in the port of Patras, situated on the western Peloponnese coast, Atherton and his companions promptly boarded a train for headed east to Corinth. They knew they needed to join a British evacuation since the Axis forces were advancing swiftly in the Balkans.However German planes machine gunned the passenger train, wounding two of Atherton's American companions. After two days overland travel to a small port near Argos, all 4 journalists had received either gunshot or shrapnel injuries during their difficult journey through the Peloponnese with air attacks as they traveled along the Corinth–Argos road, racing to meet British evacuation ships destined for Crete and Egypt. Atherton's traveling companion, Leigh White was later hospitalised in Argos, and was not able to evacuate with Atherton before this ancient city capitulated to Axis forces on 27 April 1941. However, Atherton ensured his other two American companions were evacuated with him on HMS Havock, the last British destroyer to leave Greece, alongside British and Commonwealth troops and other foreign nationals to the island of Crete, and onto Alexandria. Atherton was fortunate not to have been a victim of the Slamat disaster, having boarded HMS Havock which survived the voyage. Atherton's tale of his daring escape was reported around the world on 3 May 1941. The American weekly news magazine Newsweek published an article about Atherton and three other foreign correspondents; Russell Hill, Leigh White, and Robert St. John, who together escaped from Yugoslavia, before it was fully occupied by Axis forces, describing it as "400-miles voyage of four trapped correspondents".

== Preparations to a clandestine return into Axis occupied Yugoslavia ==
Atherton's service to the Special Operations Executive (SOE) took precedence over his journalism during World War II. There are no records of Atherton returning to the UK. During World War II, British troops used Egypt as a base for their operations throughout the region. In May 1941, Atherton would have been debriefed by SOE after safely evacuating to Alexandria.

Atherton had a deep knowledge of the Balkans, and was able to fully converse in the South Slavic languages. His level of proficiency is unknown as to whether he was able to pass as a native speaker. However, in the Balkans, a lesser degree of fluency was required as the resistance groups concerned were already in open rebellion and a clandestine existence was unnecessary.

Whilst in Cairo, Atherton enlisted as an Army Mayor; Service number 234206, ceasing his journalism profession, and was likely trained by the Intelligence Corps. He was appointed to lead a team of specialist field operatives for a future covert mission into Axis controlled Yugoslavia. He was 38 years of age.

SOE needed Atherton's skills. He had proven himself during his escape from Greece. He had sound knowledge of Yugoslavia, something the British Government was deficient in. Atherton needed to be adept at negotiating and engaging with potential working partners for the British. He was fluent in the language, had outdoor survival skills, a history of military service, and above all being an SOE agent in Belgrade made him highly suited to the task.

The British already facilitated contact between Draža Mihailović and the Yugoslav government-in-exile in London; and the young King of Yugoslavia in exile in London, and his advisors saw Mihailović as a future prime minister. However, due to the deteriorated relations between this Serb general, the self-appointed leader of the Chetnik Detachments of the Yugoslav Army, and the British liaison officer, Duane "Bill" Hudson, stationed temporarily outside of Mihailović's headquarters and engaging with partisans as part of Operation Bullseye whilst under radio silence, the SOE, not having heard from Hudson, decided at the end of 1941 to send a second mission to open up channels of communication with partisans, as well as maintain a connection with the Chetniks, and keep to script. Since Atherton was strongly anti-Communist and spoke the local language well, he was the perfect candidate for such a mission.

Atherton would have known the risks involved. SOE's first mission Operation Disclaim was not successful after its members, who parachuted in to Romanija and were captured by the Croatian authorities who handed them over to the Germans. Atherton was chosen to lead SOE's second attempt; Operation Hydra which departed Alexandria, Egypt in January 1942, a month before James Klugmann took on the Yugoslav Section of SOE as an intelligence and coordination officer, based in Cairo. Atherton and his team were to disembark from a submarine on the Budva Riviera at the beginning of February 1942, using the same method to deploy Hudson the previous year. A parallel team code name Henna consisted of 2 officers, headed by Lieutenant Rapojec were to be landed on the island of Mljet.

== Operation Hydra ==
Operation Hydra (Yugoslavia) was a failed attempt by the British during World War II to develop contact with the Yugoslav Partisans, the leading Communist-led Anti-fascist resistance group led by Josip Broz Tito, in Montenegro in February 1942. Special Operations Executive agents, including a former junior officer of the Royal Yugoslav Air Force were to be put ashore at Perazića Do, just north of Petrovac, Budva, Montenegro.

On 4 February 1942, Atherton and two other field agents, Lieutenant Radoje Nedeljković of the Yugoslav Royal Air Force and Sergeant Patrick O'Donovan, an Irish born radio operator, went ashore just north of Petrovac from the British submarine HMS Thorn. Alternative sources state that O'Donovan held the rank of Corporal, and that the two were joined by a Flying Officer Medelkovic (not Nedeljković), as well as a Sergeant Djekic.

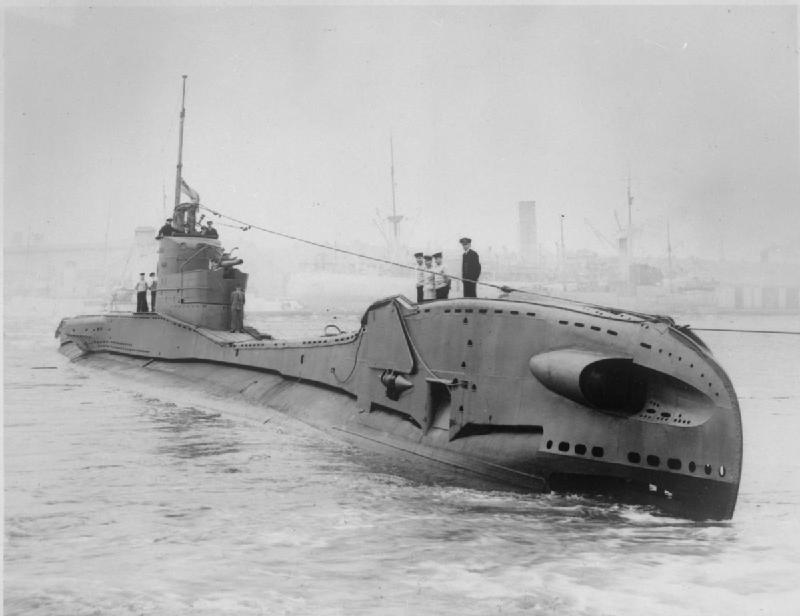
British submarine HMS Thorn, Operation Hydra.

Despite careful planning, Operation Hydra failed completely. The presence of former Yugoslav Royal Air Force officer implied strong links to the Chetniks; a royalist and nationalist movement and guerrilla force established following the invasion of Yugoslavia in 1941.

Tito would have been fully aware that the British had already established close ties with Mihailović, a Serb general and leader of the Chetniks, since October 1941. Consequently, Tito suspected his British guests of being adversarial spies to the Yugoslav partisan cause, and nothing beneficial arose from Atherton's time with Tito, and his British guests departed. Thereafter, what became of Atherton and the rest of the Op Hydra team during April 1942 is unclear. His luck had finally run out, since both he and his team disappeared without a trace. It is likely that he was targeted for the gold sovereigns (worth £2000), and Italian money (1 million Lira) that he carried around his own waist.

=== A Partisan perspective ===
The Yugoslav Partisan perceived aim of Operation Hydra was to establish and maintain communication with the Chetnik headquarters, and not establish a relationship with them.

Once ashore, Atherton and his team began their journey towards Chetnik headquarters in February 1942. However they were intercepted and redirected to their local headquarters. Atherton was prevented from continuing the perceived Op Hydra mission to rendezvous with the Chetniks; and they spent several weeks, in a futile attempt to persuade Atherton to change his anti-communist sentiment and pro-Chetnik position. Moša Pijade took Atherton to the Partisan headquarters in Foča to meet Tito, who was very suspicious about him and alerted Croatian communists of the British mission. Atherton vanished from their headquarters in Foča between the night of the 15th, and the morning of 16 April 1942, along with his team.

=== An initial Chetnik perspective ===
Chetnik sources during World War II, emphasised that during Atherton's stay in Foča, he was able to learn that Croatian communists organized cooperation between Partisans and Ustaše, a Croatian fascist and ultranationalist organisation, so Partisans had to kill him to prevent him from sending a report about the level of cooperation the Partisans had with Ustaše.

He was allegedly last seen, accompanied only by O’Donovan on 22 April 1942 when he headed walking towards German controlled territory.

=== Sequence of events ===
Atherton left Alexandria in Egypt on 17 January 1942 and disembarked off the coast of Montenegro on 4 February 1942. Atherton carried a substantial quantity of gold strapped around his waist. He was accompanied by an Irish radio operator and one officer of the Yugoslav Air Force.

Atherton had to travel from the Adriatic coast through the territory controlled by Axis forces, as well as Partisans, in order to reach Chetnik headquarters. A couple of days after Atherton and members of his mission disembarked, they met the battalion controlled by Jovan Tomašević. Tomašević took them to the headquarter of the Lovćen Partisan Detachment. The Partisans were suspicious about their mission because believed that their contemporary conflict with Montenegrin Chetniks was a result of the British and Yugoslav government-in-exile orders sent with Atherton's mission. Ivan Milutinović wanted to kill the British agents when they arrived to the Partisan HQ on 12 February 1942, because he thought they were acting on behalf of the Yugoslav government-in-exile, but he did not do it because he received a letter from Tito instructing them to bring Atherton and his team to the headquarter of supreme command near Foča. Tito informed Comintern about arrival of one British mission, and on 28 February 1942, he received their reply that they knew nothing about this mission, which additionally increased the Communists suspicions. Tito also remained very suspicious about the Atherton, although Vladimir Dedijer recognised Atherton, having met him in London prior to World War II, while he was the correspondent of Politika.

Milutinović was instructed by Tito not to allow the Op Hydra team to have contact with the Chetniks. Instead they were kept in some kind of captivity, isolated from Partisan forces and ordinary people, under the watchful eye of the Lovćen Partisan Detachment Atherton in Partisan Headquarter for Montenegro and Gulf Kotor in Gostilj, near Danilovgrad in period between 12 February 1942 until 10 March 1942 when they headed to supreme Partisan Headquarters in Foča.

Between then 19 and 22 March 1942, Atherton and members of his mission reached Foča where they stayed until 15 April 1942. In Foča in March 1942 he also met Vladimir Velebit who later confirmed that for Atherton Partisans were only "a bypass or way station" en route to Draža Mihailović, just as they had experienced with Hudson the previous year. During his stay in Foča with the Yugoslav Partisans, Atherton contacted with his supreme command using his radio station.

On 6 April 1942, Tito wrote a letter to Pijade, expressing his concerns about Atherton's mission. On 8 April 1942 a secret directive was issued to the communist commissars to warn them about Atherton. This secret directive was allegedly issued to the Communist Party of Croatia According to some anticommunist sources, Atherton was able to learn about contacts between Tito and his most trusted men from the Central Committee of Croatia with leaders of the Independent State of Croatia. This sources emphasize that Partisans and Ustaše made an agreement according to which Ustaše allowed Partisans to enter Foča, supplied them with ammunition to fight against Chetniks and to stay in Foča for several months without any obstruction from Croatian side. Some pro-Chetnik sources even emphasize that Partisans killed Atherton because he had intention to inform his superiors about the cooperation between Partisans and Ustaše.

Tito was afraid that Atherton was a member of just one of many other British missions who were all encouraging Chetniks to attack communists. The Chetnik attacks on communist forces in the region coincided with arrival of the Atherton's mission. Based on the discussions during the session of the Central Communist Committee held on 4 April 1942, Tito issued instructions to find and isolate all British missions. Tito suggested to Atherton not to continue his voyage toward Chetniks, and it was understood by Atherton that he was forbidden to leave Foča.

Whilst Atherton was a "guest" of the Partisans, they tried to convince him to change his pro-Chetnik and anti-Communist orientation. Ivan Milutinović had numerous exhausting polemics with Atherton in futile attempts to convince him to change his positive view about Chetnik leader Draža Mihailović. Pijade took him on a tour of inspection of the organization of the communist forces in Žabljak. When they arrived at Partisans headquarter near Foča, Atherton also met Vladimir Dedijer who showed him some agreement about alleged Chetniks cooperation with Milan Nedić. The communists claimed that Yugoslav government-in-exile approved that agreement and that it was the proof of collaboration between Chetniks and Axis forces. Tito presented to Atherton his proposal to establish new Yugoslav Government from democratic elements from both Yugoslavia and abroad and to invite population of Yugoslavia to rebel against Axis, condemning all collaborators with occupying Axis forces.

At the beginning of April 1942, Atherton was taken by Partisans for an "inspection tour of the front", towards Rogatica in order to demonstrate that only the Partisans were fighting against the Axis. The Yugoslav post-war sources emphasize that Partisans managed to convince Atherton to change his pro-Chetnik and anticommunist view at the extent that he began arguing with General Petar Nedeljković, according to the letter sent to Pijade by Tito on 11 April 1942.

Atherton secretly left Foča during the night between 15 and 16 April 1942 with support of General Nedeljković and local Chetnik commander Spasoje Dakić and hid in caves around Čelebići until 22 April. He left his radio station with Partisans in Foča. The Partisans sent their units to search for Atherton as soon as they realised they left Foča.

On 22 April 1942, Atherton sent a letter to Mihailović in which he asked Mihailović to inform his superiors that he was alive and that he would shortly be sending more information.

Latas explained that Atherton had some disagreements with General Nedeljković and on 22 April 1942, continued on foot, headed towards German-occupied Serbia to seek Mihailović, accompanied only by O'Donovan. Latas further explain that two of them were shadowed by Spasoje Dakić until they approached a village of Tatarevina. What became of the other team members of Op Hydra is a mystery.

Atherton was allegedly killed on 15 July 1942 by a bandit. However at the end of the war his murder, and the murder of his sergeant was described as a war crime.

=== Subsequent SOE missions ===
Atherton's friend and former assistant editor at the South Slav Herald in Belgrade, Alexander Simić-Stevens took part in Operation Fungus which departed Derna, Libya in April 1943. Another simultaneous SOE mission, Operation Hoathley 1 took place simultaneously. Each mission served as each other's backup to increase the chances of British success.

== Testimonials ==
Some early accounts explained that Atherton was executed by Partisans because they concluded he brought "undesired influence" from Cairo. The War Diaries of Vladimir Dedijer: From 28 November 1942, to 10 September 1943, indicate that Atherton may have been part of a plot to assassinate Tito.

Based on initial testimonies that he was killed by Partisans, The New York Times published an article blaming them for his death, which was denied by a letter written by Tito (the future Yugoslav Head of State) himself.

An account given by Ljubo Novaković, a 60 year old former Brigadier General captured by Partisans and taken to Foča in January 1942 presents a twist. Novaković was kept under constant surveillance; and months later would meet Atherton upon Op Hydra's arrival in Foča. These circumstances raise the possibility that the British mission may have been murdered by Partisans. It is likely that Tito had initially planned to eventually use Novaković to counteract Mihailović's influence among Chetniks in eastern Bosnia. However Atherton's arrival presented an opportunity for Novaković who left Foča on 15 April 1942 without Tito's knowledge, allegedly with Atherton. Before leaving, Novaković left Tito a note in which he threatened to raise 5,000 Chetniks to fight the Partisans in eastern Bosnia. Furious, Tito became convinced that the British had devised an elaborate plot to disadvantage the Partisans by strengthening the Chetniks. Novaković survived one more year, however Atherton may still have been betrayed by a rogue band of Chetniks.

After Atherton's disappearance, Partisan sources subsequently blamed the Chetniks, while SOE, British Ministers, and Western media sources initially blamed the Yugoslav Partisans, collectively they later accepted the probability that Atherton and his team were instead killed by Chetniks.

The British liaison officer at Mihailović's headquarters, Bill Hudson, insisted Mihailović conduct a formal inquiry into the fate of Major Atherton's mission. It would have seemed ironic to Hudson, that Atherton's mission had primarily been to ascertain his own whereabouts in January 1941. Atherton was effectively chosen to be his rescuer; and now Hudson was trying to investigate Atherton's untimely death. A summary of the results of this investigation was sent by Hudson, [known by the nom de guerre Marko] to SOE office in Cairo. According to the results of the inquiry, the most probable culprit for Atherton's death was Četnik leader Spasoje Dakić.

Atherton and O'Donovan, his radio operator, left Čelebić on 22 April for the village of Tatarovina, and were escorted part of the way by Dakić. They were never seen again. Dakić, who later appeared at Mihailović's headquarters in possession of Atherton's binoculars, and wearing his boots, had probably murdered both men and stolen the large quantity of gold sovereigns which Atherton was carrying. He was only 'nominally a Mihailović Cetnik', but Hudson had the impression that Mihailović 'knew something about the matter'. This summary completed such evidence as Hudson was able to assemble up to July 1942. Mihailović's first reaction to all these happenings was to insinuate to London, as an astute propaganda move, that the British members of the party had been killed by Partisans. He stated this in a message, dated 27 May, at a moment when in reality he and the British military authorities in Cairo had every reason to believe that Atherton was alive. At the end of the signal Mihailović announced that, because of these murders, 'he had declared open warfare on all Partisans'.

According to the late Croatian military historian Jozo Tomašević, the investigation led by Hudson and William Bailey concluded that Atherton was murdered and robbed by local Chetnik commander Spasoje Dakić in the village of Tatarovina, in modern-day Northern Montenegro. According to some sources, Dakić was a commander of Chetnik battalion from Čelebići. According to Dedijer, Dakić was a criminal from Montenegro.

== Post war investigation and release of records to the general public ==
Further investigation into Atherton's untimely death continued in the aftermath of the war. Yugoslav sources indicated the strong likelihood that Atherton was killed by Chetniks. The person who committed murder remained unknown.

The post-war Yugoslav sources later complained that at that particular point in time (1941–42), the Allies had increased their support to the Chetniks who were challenging Partisan superiority, instead of supporting the "genuine anti-Axis partisan forces".

On 14 February 1945, in the House of Commons, Miss Irene Ward, MP asked the Secretary of State for War whether he could make a statement on the death of Atherton. The British government response delivered by the Under-Secretary of State for War, Arthur Henderson MP was that the circumstances in which he died 3 years prior were still unclear. He may have been killed by partisans, or by the Germans.

In 1946, the new regime in Belgrade staged a politically and ideologically motivated trial of Draža Mihailović, which resulted in his death sentence. The unresolved mystery of Atherton and his teams disappearance was an integral part of the trial, likely to justify an ideological purpose. Later during the trial under cross examination Mihailović advised that he had conducted a personal inquiry in 1942 into the likely murder of Atherton, who admitted that he had probably been executed on the orders of one of his subordinate generals. The Times of London added that Mihailović thought that the murder was instigated by Novakovich, who aimed to be recognised as the supreme commander of Serbia. Mihailović was executed on 17 July 1946, together with nine other officers for their crimes.

In the 1988, Sir Fitzroy Maclean, 1st Baronet, responsible for Maclean Mission of 1943, expressed concern about the unsolved case of the disappearance of Atherton, and the possible involvement by Momčilo Đujić and his Dinara Division in Atherton's likely capture and execution. This view by Brigadier Maclean was reported in the Times of London.

Atherton's heroics were archived in London, away from Public access for many years, and his name fell into obscurity, until 30 June 1997. It was only on 1 July 1997 that the Daily Mail of London reported on page 15, "Tragic Mystery of Mailman who led Commando Mission". A Daily Mail journalist (one of their own) had died a hero's death on a mission behind enemy lines during World War II.

Atherton was at the opposite end of the political spectrum of his coordinator in Cairo, Klugmann and this may have put his life at risk. Less than a year after Atherton's death, Churchill switched his support to Tito, having been previously aligned with the Serb Royalist leader General Draža Mihailović, who was at the time the chief beneficiary of British aid and support in the resistance movement in Yugoslavia. It is likely that Klugmann's reports influenced this change in policy, which coincided with Atherton being on the ground in Yugoslavia, leading Operation Hydra. These circumstances are likely to be justification for Atherton's records remaining closed for 61 years after his disappearance. His records within the National Archives were not open to the public until April 2003.

Some authors blame the persistent misreporting of the BBC and attribution of successful Chetnik anti-Axis actions to Communists on a supposed strong network of Soviet spies in the BBC and the British Ministry of Information. This misreporting changed British public opinion and even influenced some high-ranking officials. At the same time some historians have said that such BBC broadcasts potentially put Atherton and other field agents at greater risk.

== Memorial and legacy ==
Atherton is honoured and remembered, as part of the General Service Corps. His memorial is at the Phaleron War Cemetery in Athens. His date of death is marked as 15 July 1942, although he may have died as early as 17 April 1942. It is unusual that other members of Operation Hydra have not been added to this war memorial.

In addition to his war service, Atherton should be remembered for promoting Balkan co-operation in the 1930s, as well as an understanding of the Balkans by the English speaking communities of the issues that are considered most important to each of the various ethnicities living in the region. He founded the South Slav Herald in 1931 and The Balkan Herald in 1934. His articles have been published on across the globe.

== Dramatisation ==
Atherton appears as the main character of the Yugoslav-3 part mini-series The Mission of Major Atherton, directed by Sava Mrmak, where he was played by Slovenian actor Majtaž Višnar.

== See also ==
- Yugoslavia and the Allies
- History of the Balkans
- Chetnik sabotage of Axis communication lines
- Charles Armstrong (British Army officer)
- Western betrayal

== Bibliography ==
- Carmichael, Cathie (2 July 2015). A Concise History of Bosnia. Cambridge University Press. ISBN 978-1-107-01615-6.
- Čekić, Smail (1996). Genocide against Bosniaks in World War II: Documents. Muslim Association for Antigenocidal Activities.
- Davidson, Basil (1946). Partisan Picture. Bedford: Bedford Books Ltd.
- Deakin, Frederick William (1971). The Embattled Mountain. Oxford: Oxford University Press.
- Dedijer, Vladimir (1990). The War Diaries of Vladimir Dedijer: From November 28, 1942, to September 10, 1943. University of Michigan Press. ISBN 978-0-472-10109-2.
- Hersey, John (2001). Reporting World War 2. Library of America. ISBN 978-1-931082-05-1.
- Institute (1982). The National liberation war and revolution in Yugoslavia (1941-1945): selected documents. Military History Institute of the Yugoslav People's Army.
- John, Robert St. (1957). Foreign correspondent. Doubleday.
- Jovanović, Aleksandar S. (1999). Broz i Hrvati. Ldij. ISBN 9788670261266.
- Kardelj, Edvard (1982). Reminiscences--the Struggle for Recognition and Independence: The New Yugoslavia, 1944-1957. Blond & Briggs. ISBN 978-0-85634-135-9.
- Kurapovna, Marcia Christoff (2009). Shadows on the Mountain: The Allies, the Resistance, and the Rivalries that Doomed WWII Yugoslavia. New Brunswick, New Jersey: John Wiley & Sons. ISBN 978-0-47061-566-9.
- Larson, David L. (1979). United States Foreign Policy Toward Yugoslavia: 1943-1963. University Press of America. ISBN 978-0-8191-0669-8.
- Latas, Branko (1979). Četnički pokret Draže Mihailovića: 1941-1945. Beogradski izdavačko-grafički zavod.
- Marković, Lazo (1970). Ivan Milutinović Milutin. Grafički zavod.
- Matić, Boško (1984). Krcun: (životopis Slobodana Penezića Krcuna). Dečje novine.
- Nathan, George Jean; Mencken, Henry Louis (1943). The American Mercury. American Mercury Magazine.
- Pleterski, Janko (2008). Pravica in moč za samoodločbo: med Metternichom in Badinterjem : študije, razgledi, preudarki iz petnajstletja po tretji odločitvi Slavencev. Modrijan. ISBN 978-961-241-261-6.
- Radlovic, I. Monte (1948). Titoś Republic. Coldharbour Press.
- Redžić, Vučeta (2002). Građanski rat u Crnoj Gori: Dešavanja od sredine 1942. godine do sredine 1945. godine. Stupovi.
- Ridley, Jasper Godwin (1994). Tito. Constable. ISBN 978-0-09-471260-7.
- Roberts, Walter R. (1973). Tito, Mihailović, and the Allies, 1941-1945. Rutgers University Press. ISBN 978-0-8135-0740-8.
- St. John, Robert (1948). The Silent People Speak. Doubleday.
- Šnuderl, Makso (1994). Dnevnik 1941-1945: V partizanih. Založba Obzorja. ISBN 978-86-377-0739-4.
- Šuvar, Mira; Velebit, Vladimir (2001). Vladimir Velebit: svjedok historije. Razlog. ISBN 978-953-6985-00-5.
- Tomasevich, Jozo (1975). War and Revolution in Yugoslavia, 1941–1945: The Chetniks. Stanford, California: Stanford University Press. ISBN 978-0-8047-0857-9.
- Tomašević, Jozo (1979). Četnici u Drugom svjetskom ratu: 1941-1945. Sveučilišna naklada Liber.
- Vukcevich, Bosko S. (1990). Diverse forces in Yugoslavia: 1941-1945. Authors Unlimited. ISBN 978-1-55666-053-5.
- White, Leigh (1944). The Long Balkan Night. C. Scribner's sons.
- Williams, Heather (2003). Parachutes, Patriots and Partisans: The Special Operations Executive and Yugoslavia, 1941-1945. C. Hurst & Co. Publishers. ISBN 978-1-85065-592-3.
- Zečević, Vlada (1968). Raste ustanak: I ovo da se zna. Prosveta.
