= Ljubišnja =

- Љубишња
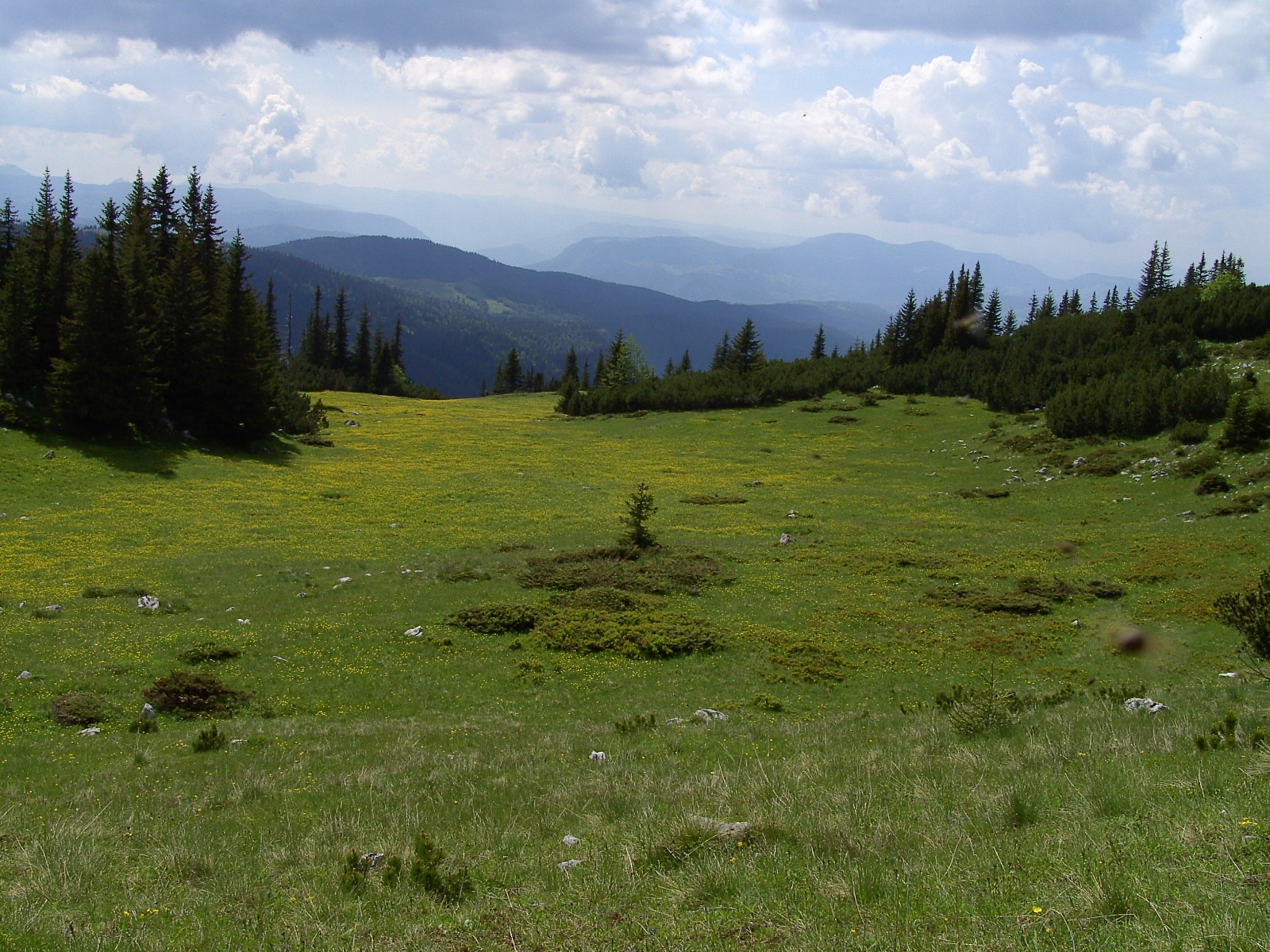
- View of Ljubišnja from the village of Bobovo, Pljevlja

Highest point
- Elevation: 2,238 m (7,343 ft)
- Prominence: 1,256 m (4,121 ft)
- Listing: Ribu
- Coordinates: 43°19′12″N 19°05′10″E

Geography
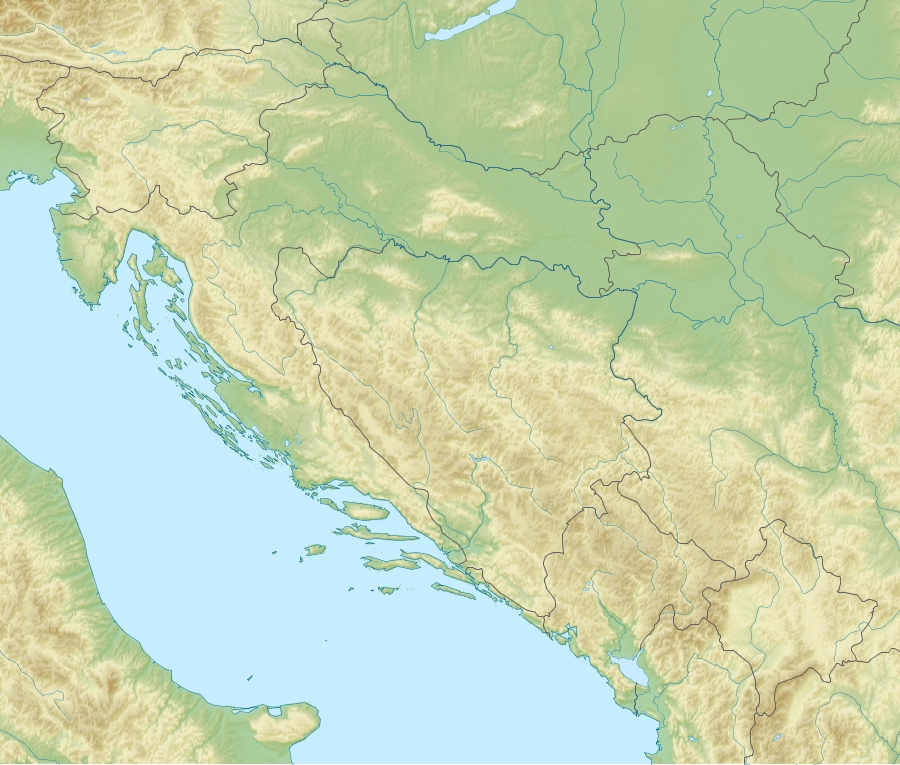
- Location within Bosnia and Herzegovina Location within Montenegro Location within Dinaric Alps
- Location: Bosnia and Herzegovina and Montenegro
- Parent range: Dinaric Alps

Geology
- Mountain type(s): Sedimentary, Dinaric Karst

Ljubišnja (Serbian Cyrillic: Љубишња) is a Dinaric mountain range between Bosnia and Herzegovina and Montenegro. By Montenegrins the range is referred to as the highland of Montenegro. Together with the Tara, Ćehotina, Tara Canyon and Draga Canyon it represents a major natural feature for both countries.

== Geography ==
The mountain is situated on the border of eastern Bosnia and Herzegovina and the extreme northwest of Montenegro. The mountain rises between the rivers Ćehotina and Tara and borders on the massif of Durmitor. Maximum altitude is 2,238 metres (7,343 ft) at the Dernečišta peak, while the lowest elevation is 600 m (2,000 ft) at valley Sandića Ubo in village of Bobovo wedged in the cliffs of two canyons the Tara Canyon on the southwest, and Draga Canyon on the left side of the valley of Ćehotina river.

The Ljubišnja mountain area is characterised by temperate mountainous coniferous forests, alpine meadows and pastures, cultivated fields, numerous ponds and springs. Widespread alpenrose the distinctive emblem of the village scattered on the plateau of Ljubišnja.

Picea forests dominate to alpine levels and temperate shrubs such as mountain pine, and alpenrose are widespread. The area occupies 380 km^{2} (150 sq mi).

== Gallery ==
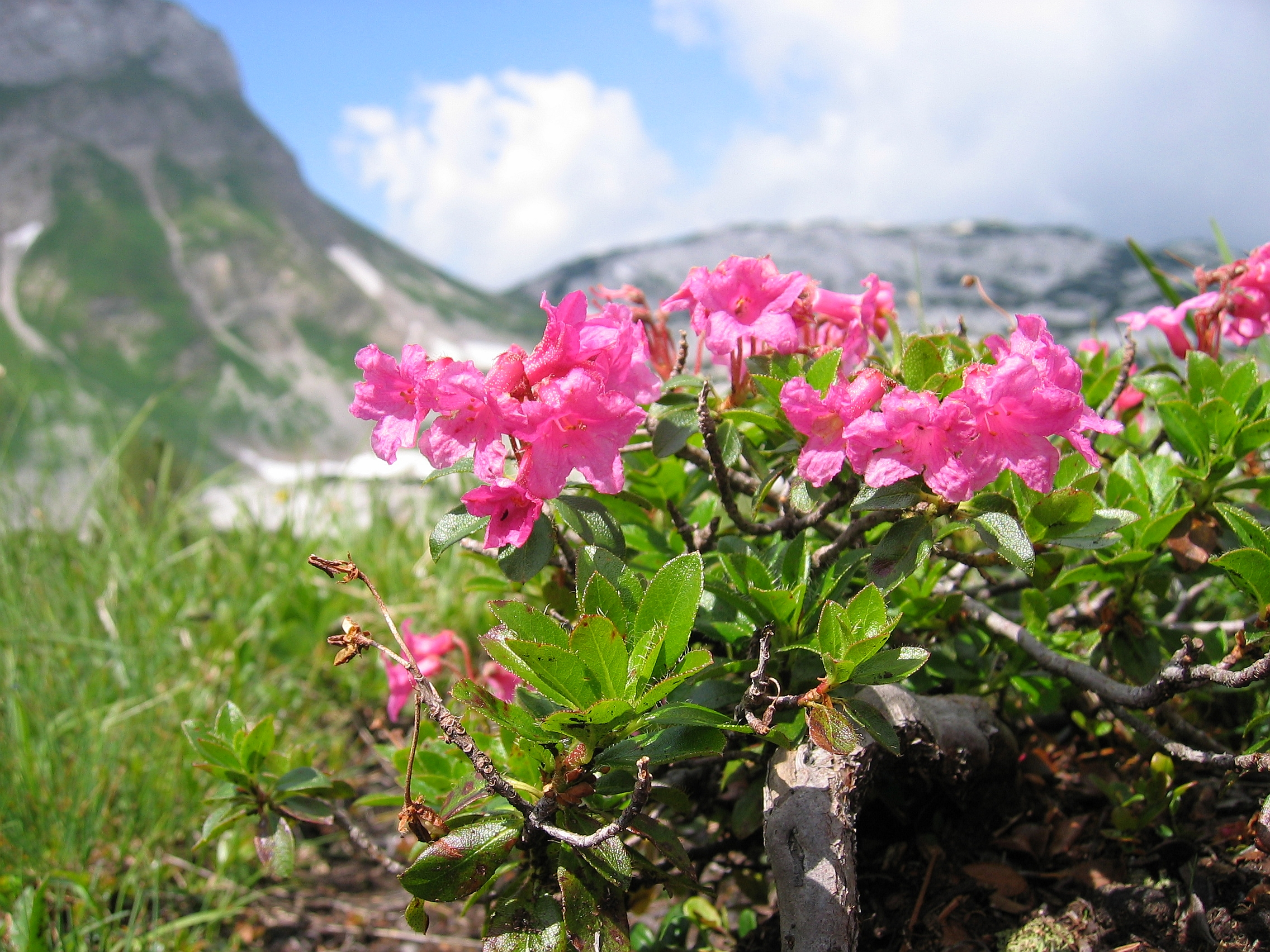

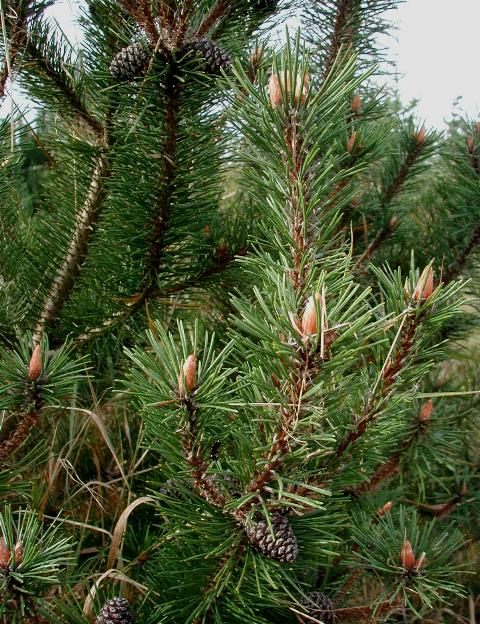

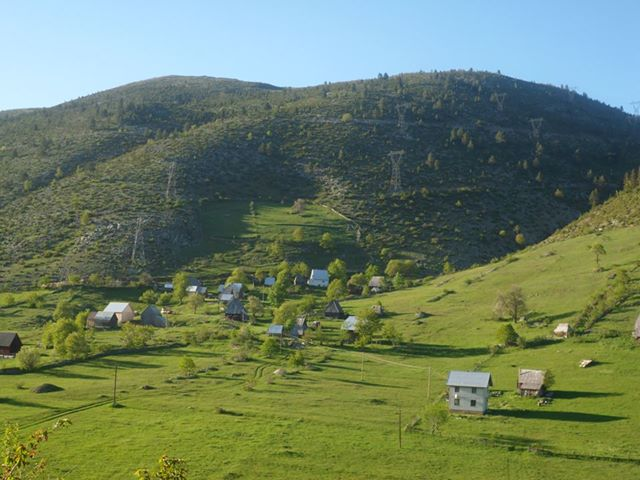

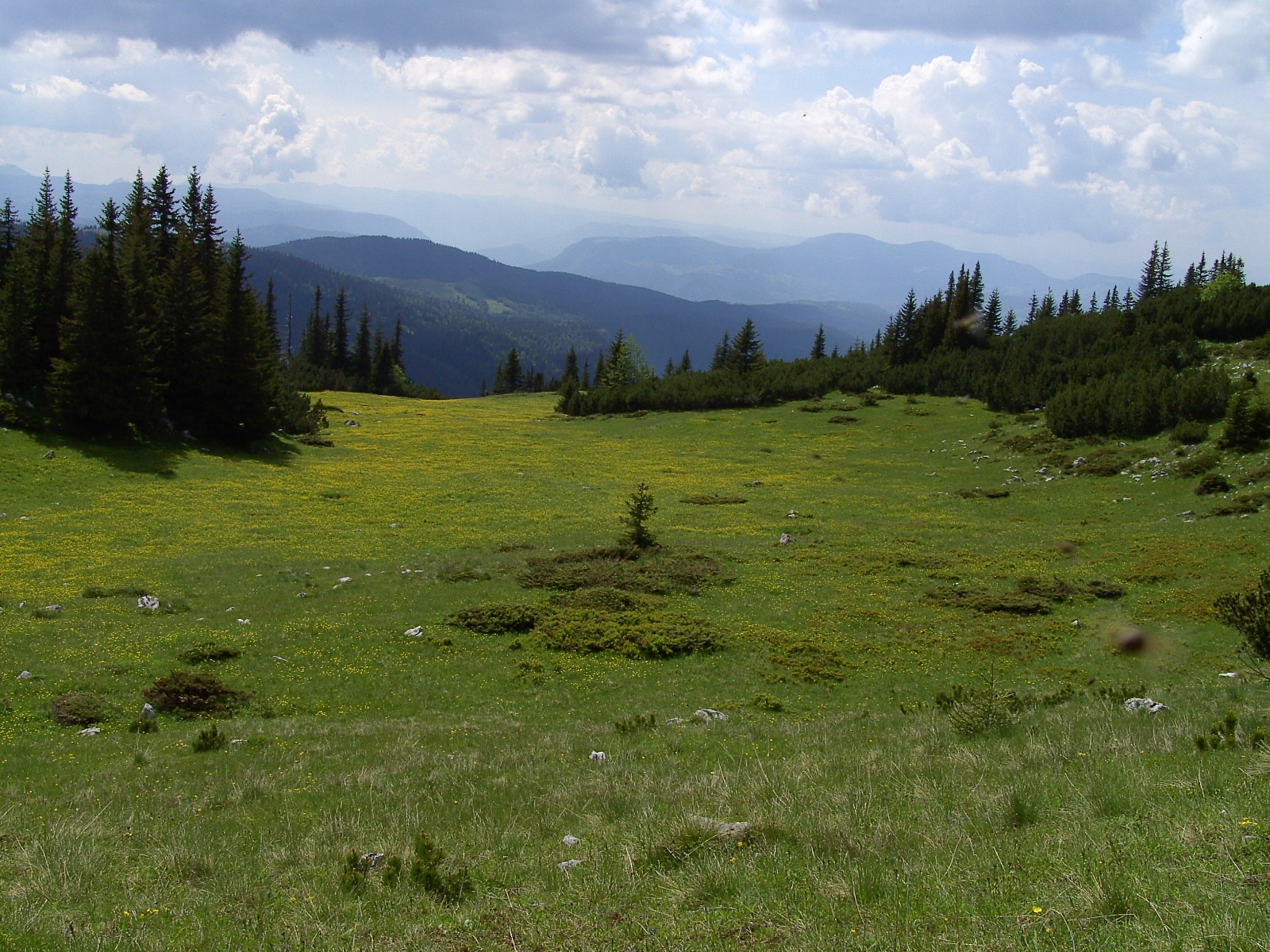

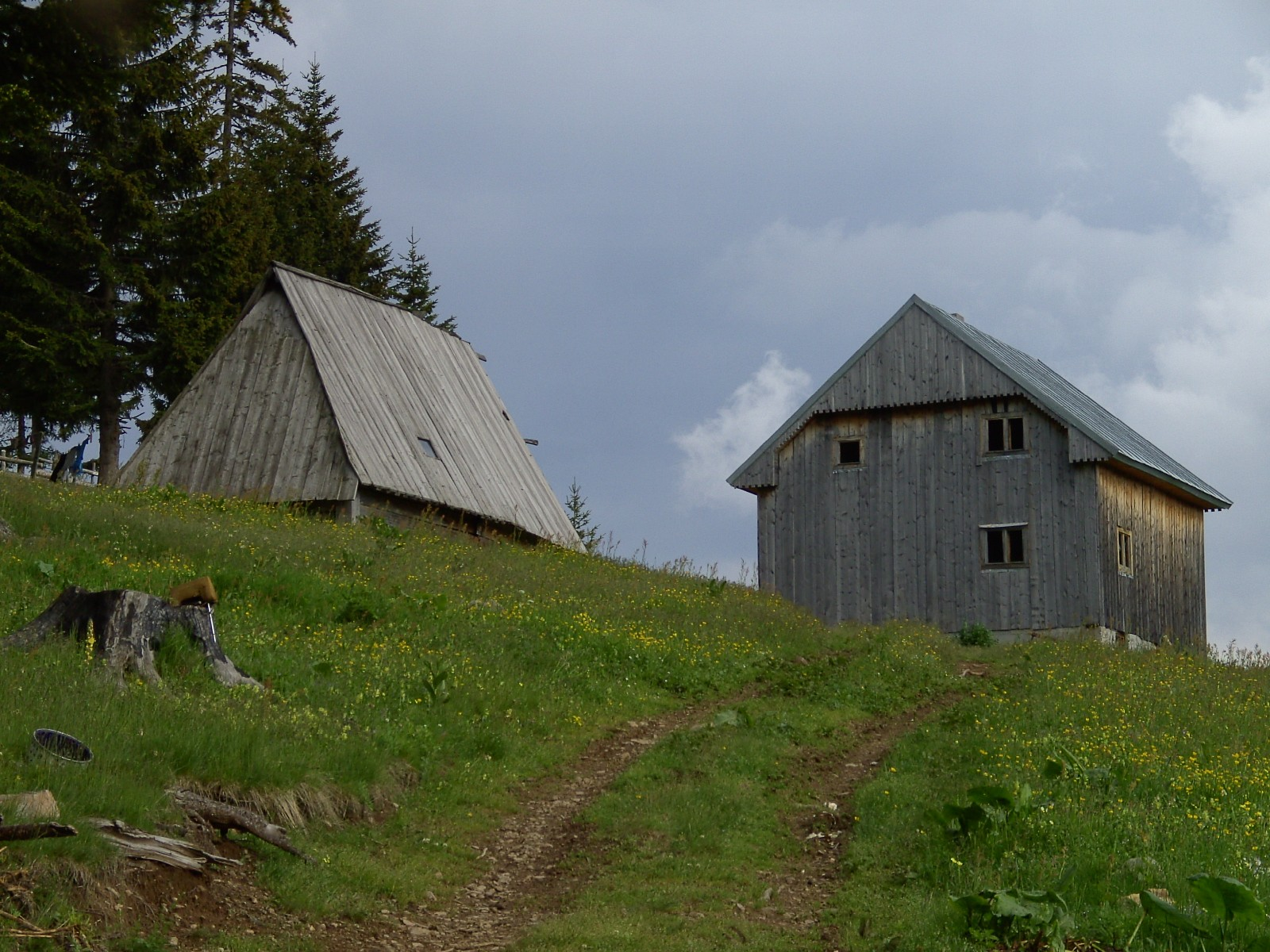

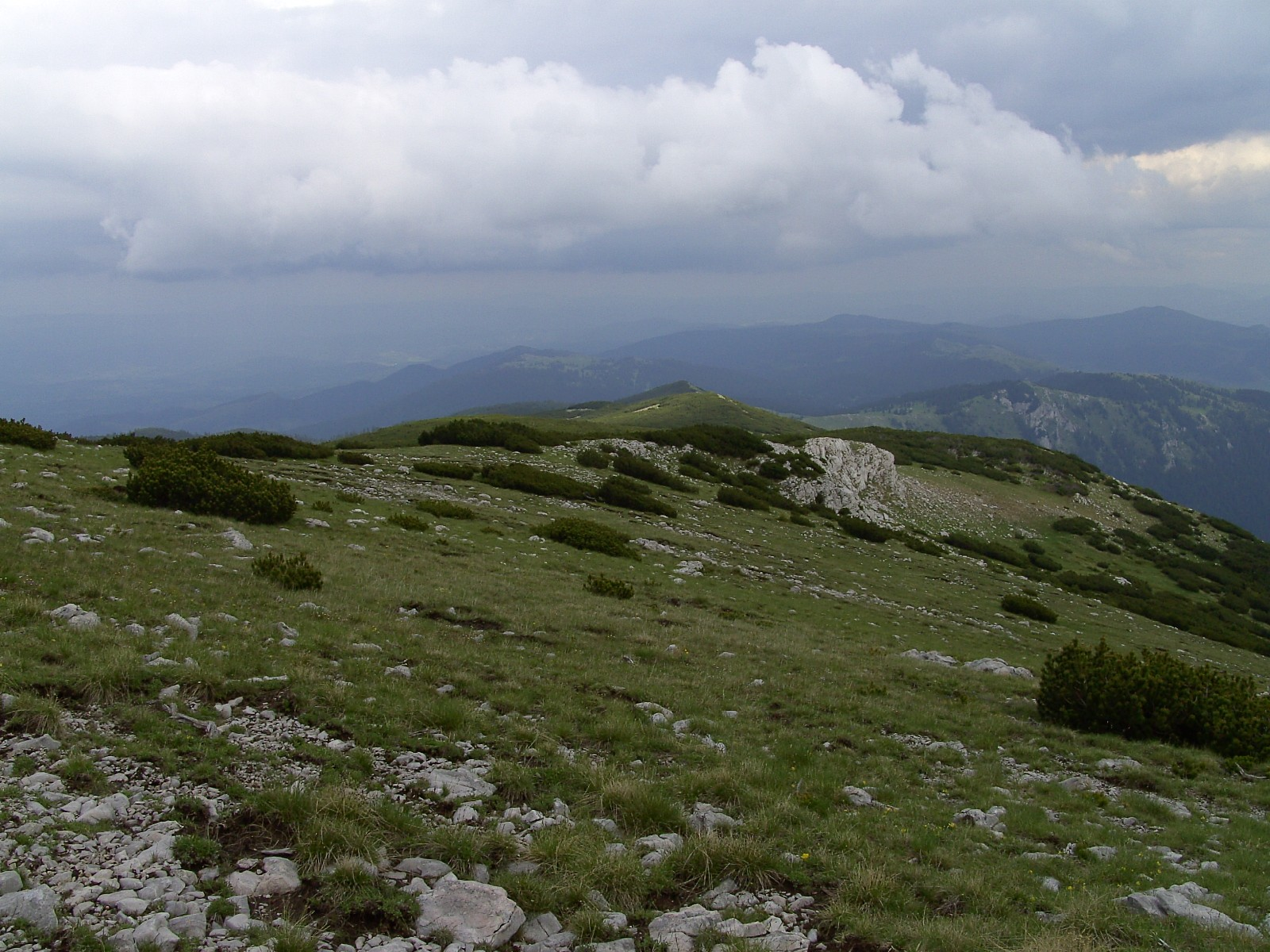

== See also ==
- Pljevlja
- Gradac, Pljevlja
- Ćehotina
- Tara (Drina)
- Đurđevića Tara Bridge
- Čelebići (Foča)
- Foča

== Literature ==
- Васовић, Милорад (2009). Историја Пљеваља. ISBN 978-9940-512-03-3.

=== Sources ===
- Васовић, Милорад (2009). Историја Пљеваља. ISBN 978-9940-512-03-3.
