= The Man Who Played God =

The Man Who Played God may refer to:

- The Man Who Played God (1922 film)
- The Man Who Played God (1932 film)
- The Man Who Played God (novel) by Robert St. John
