= The Hunting Party (2007 film) =

- Theatrical release poster
- Directed by: Richard Shepard
- Written by: Richard Shepard
- Based on: "What I Did on My Summer Vacation" by Scott K. Anderson
- Produced by: Bill Block; Mark Johnson; Scott Kroopf
- Starring: Richard Gere; Terrence Howard; Jesse Eisenberg; Ljubomir Kerekeš; Diane Kruger; James Brolin; Dylan Baker; Kristina Krepela
- Cinematography: David Tattersall
- Edited by: Carole Kravetz
- Music by: Rolfe Kent
- Production companies: Gran Via Productions; Intermedia; QED International
- Distributed by: Metro-Goldwyn-Mayer; The Weinstein Company (United States); QED International (Overseas)
- Release date: September 14, 2007
- Running time: 101 minutes
- Country: United States
- Language: English
- Box office: $7.6 million

The Hunting Party is a 2007 American satirical black comedy thriller film written and directed by Richard Shepard and starring Richard Gere, Terrence Howard, Diane Kruger, Jesse Eisenberg and Ljubomir Kerekeš. The working title for this film was Spring Break in Bosnia before being changed to The Hunting Party during post-production.

The Hunting Party had its world premiere at the 64th Venice International Film Festival on September 3, 2007. The film turned out to be a huge commercial disappointment domestically, grossing only US$969,869 in US theatres.

== Plot ==
The film begins with a disclaimer: Only the most ridiculous parts of this story are true.

After years of covering one armed conflict after another, American journalist Simon Hunt is in Bosnia and Herzegovina in early 1994 reporting on the Bosnian War. In parallel, he has managed to romance a local Muslim young woman who is pregnant with his child. However, in the late stages of her pregnancy, she is killed by the Bosnian Serb forces when they overrun her village. Upon seeing the carnage, Simon vows revenge on the Bosnian Serb political leader Dragoslav Bogdanović —known as "The Fox".

Reporting on the gruesome event later that day in a live remote link-up, Simon loses his composure at the network anchor Franklin Harris' suggestion that the Serb attack may have been a reaction to Muslim provocation attacks from inside the village. As a result of his on-air meltdown, Simon's journalistic career takes a tumble. While his professional prospects spiral downhill, those of his long-time camera man Duck go in the opposite direction. Duck gets a cushy job at the network, while Hunt is left following war after war, as a freelancer, in an attempt to get back on the US network television map.

In fall 2000, Duck, now a professional, travels to Sarajevo to a "puff piece" of the network anchor Franklin Harris covering the fifth anniversary of the Dayton Agreement, along with the fresh-out-of-Harvard young journalist, and son of the network vice-president, Benjamin. Duck runs into his old buddy Simon. Once a US network star reporter, Simon is, by this point, a desperate half-drunk cynic reduced to filing freelance reports for underfunded news outlets in places like Jamaica and Poland.

All the while, Simon's looking for a story big enough to propel him back to the realm of credibility. He tells Duck that, through a source, he has located Bogdanović, who is now wanted for war crimes with a US$5 million bounty on his head, and that he'd be interested in trying to score an interview with the fugitive. The Fox is assumed to be in the village of Čelebići, in the Serbian entity of Bosnia, near the border with Montenegro, with various stories circulating about him, such as that he enjoys fox hunting (hence the nickname) and that the head of his security detail is a ruthless psychopath with a tattooed forehead.

Convinced by Simon, Duck comes along to shoot the interview, with Benjamin in tow. On the way, Simon confesses his plan to capture the Fox to collect the bounty — something Duck and Benjamin consider insane even to think about. Along the way, the group is mistaken for a CIA hit squad by several groups, including the United Nations police force and the Serbs themselves; at one point, at the initiative of Benjamin, they claim to be CIA agents themselves, using a threat to avoid paying a fee for a tip. Still, Boris, the local area UN commander, puts them in touch with a woman claiming to have been romantically involved with the Fox's main bodyguard Srđan.

Simon, Duck, and Benjamin are then captured by the Fox's guards and taken to a barn to be executed where axe-wielding Srđan — who has the phrase "умро пре рођења" ("died before birth") tattooed on his forehead in Cyrillic alphabet — is preparing to kill them through torture. At the last moment, a team of CIA assassins, tipped off by Boris, storms the barn and frees the journalists, but Fox escapes. It quickly becomes evident to the journalists that, even in the international community, there are people who do not wish the Fox to be captured.

The CIA orders the journalists to board an airplane bound for the US, but they run away to carry out their plan to catch the Fox. They capture him while he is hunting in the woods without his guards. The journalists then release him, with his hands securely bound, in a village called Polje filled with the surviving family members of victims of his war crimes, where he is lynched by the vengeful mob.

As the film ends, before the closing credits, the screen goes to black and the following message is shown:

In theory, the official hunt for war criminals in Bosnia continues to this day...However, the two most wanted men — Radovan Karadžić and Ratko Mladić, continue to elude the U.S, The United Nations, The European Union, NATO, The Hague and all in the civilized world who claim to be looking for them. In the ten years that Radovan Karadžić has been on the run, he has published two books and one play. Perhaps if the International Community opened a summerstock theatre...But they're probably too busy "searching" for Osama bin Laden [sic].

Ratko Mladić was arrested on 26 May 2011, and Radovan Karadžić was arrested in Belgrade on 21 July 2008 and brought before Belgrade's War Crimes Court a few days later.

The film ends and is then followed by a montage of people and events seen in the movie with words such as, "really existed", flashed across the screen as various characters are shown throughout the film.

== Cast ==
- Richard Gere as Simon Hunt
- Terrence Howard as "Duck"
- James Brolin as Franklin Harris
- Jesse Eisenberg as Benjamin Strauss
- Ljubomir Kerekeš as Dr. Dragoslav "The Fox" Bogdanović
- Kristina Krepela as Marda
- Diane Kruger as Mirjana
- Mark Ivanir as Boris, Local UN Commander
- Zdravko Kočevar as Sascha
- Snežana Marković as Una
- Goran Kostić as Srđan, Fox's Main Bodyguard
- Miraj Grbić as Goran, Thug #1
- R. Mahalakshmi Devaraj as Miriam
- Joy Bryant as Duck's Girlfriend
- Damir Šaban as Gert
- Nitin Ganatra as Eknath Bharwani, Indian UN Officer
- Dylan Baker as CIA Man
- Luka Peroš as Commando #1

== The Esquire article ==
The trailer for the Bosnia-set movie The Hunting Party announces it is "based on a true story". The film is, in fact, very loosely based on the events depicted in an Esquire magazine article by American journalist Scott Anderson. Published in October 2000 under the title "What I Did on My Summer Vacation", the article talks about a group of five Western war-reporters who reunited in Sarajevo during April 2000 and, over some drinks at a local bar one night, decided to make a half-hearted attempt at catching the accused war criminal and fugitive Radovan Karadžić. In addition to Anderson, the group consisted of two more Americans, Sebastian Junger and John Falk, as well as Dutchman Harald Doornbos and Philippe Deprez from Belgium. Other than alcohol, the starting point for their "manhunt" was an article in local weekly newsmagazine Slobodna Bosna notorious for sensationalist reporting that claimed Karadžić, along with his heavily armed security detail, had been spotted in the village of Čelebići in Republika Srpska (Serbian entity within Bosnia and Herzegovina) near the border with Montenegro.

Before going into Čelebići, the party of five journalists first came to the nearby town of Foča, where they inquired about the safety of their trip among the locally stationed UN personnel. They soon caught the eye of a well-connected local UN officer from Ukraine who became convinced they were a covert crew sent in to apprehend Karadžić and decided to help them out by putting them in touch with a supposedly high-ranking Serbian secret police officer. The journalists decided to play along, and after returning from an uneventful visit to Čelebići, they arranged a meeting with the Serbian secret policeman who, too, was convinced they were a CIA Black Operations team. He also claimed to have an intimate knowledge of Karadžić's movements and whereabouts, and in return for ratting him out he wanted American passports for himself, his wife, and their four kids, as well as a cut of the bounty prize.

Despite being not at all convinced of the honesty and sincerity of either the Ukrainian UN officer or the Serbian secret policeman, the journalists decided to play along even further, thus setting in motion a chain of events that in the end led to local NATO officials, American embassy personnel, and apparently even top American security officials from overseas getting involved.

Scott Anderson's conclusion at the end of the article was that UN and NATO not only exhibited little interest in actually finding Karadžić, but they also actively sabotaged any such meaningful attempt from within their own ranks. When he was discovered, however, Karadžić turned out to be hiding in disguise and alone. Junger, Falk, Doornbos, and Deprez make cameo appearances in the movie as unnamed journalists in the press pack.

== Reception and reaction ==
=== United States ===
Critical reaction to The Hunting Party was mixed. The film critic site Rotten Tomatoes gives the film a 56% rating, based on 91 reviews. The aggregate consensus states: "The Hunting Party is tonally awkward: its shifts from dark satire to serious political thriller create an uneven film, despite best efforts from its game leads".

The site Metacritic showed a rating of 54 out of 100, qualifying as "Average or Mixed Reviews", based on 22 ratings. The New York Times reviewer Manohla Dargis called the film: "A misfired, misguided would-be satire." Owen Gleiberman for Entertainment Weekly stated, on the other hand: "What makes The Hunting Party an original, gonzo treat is the way that Shepard plants the movie's tone somewhere between hair-trigger investigative danger and the from-the-frying-pan-into-the-fire glee of a Hope/Crosby picture." Elvis D'Silva of Rediff India, in his article "Fails to entertain", has questioned how much the movie reflects reality of the War in Bosnia and Herzegovina.

Richard Gere promoted The Hunting Party with guest appearances on the Late Show with David Letterman and Late Night with Conan O'Brien. Still, the movie turned out to be a commercial disappointment domestically, grossing only US$969,869 in US theatres. It opened small, on September 7, 2007, initially being shown only on four screens in New York City and Los Angeles. It gradually expanded to other parts of USA over the following weeks, first to 40 screens, and then to 329. It ended its US theatrical life some six weeks after its release.

=== Europe ===
Almost simultaneously to the US, The Hunting Party was released in Turkey on September 14, 2007. Released as Av Partisi, in its two months at Turkish theaters, the movie managed to gross US$424,048.

On November 29, 2007, the film was released in Germany as Hunting Party – Wenn der Jäger zum Gejagten wird ("When the Hunter Becomes the Hunted") and grossed US$203,705 during just under a month at the theaters.

Also on November 29, 2007, the movie was released in Croatia. Its release in that country is particularly notable because most of the movie was shot there and the only two non-Hollywood actors with significant roles in it are Croats Kristina Krepela and Ljubomir Kerekeš. However, the movie received mostly lukewarm reviews in the Croatian media with mainstream print daily Jutarnji list reviewer Nenad Polimac criticizing the stock character portrayal of its villain - The Fox - as a stereotypical Hollywood baddie while suggesting the end product would've been a lot better had the movie been shot verbatim according to Anderson's original magazine article without the application of the Hollywood makeover. Additionally, Polimac's review longs for the days when "prestigious films like Fiddler on the Roof and Sophie's Choice were being shot here". The movie didn't fare much better in Croatian cyberspace, as Film.hr's Boško Picula complains: "despite its smooth plot, rounded-off characters, commendable attempts at reaching the virtue of genuineness, and welcome flirting with the absurd, The Hunting Party fails when all of that needs to be put together into a logical unit" while Film-Mag.net's Robert Jukić refers to the overall product as "interestingly conceived, but poorly executed". At present, there is no box-office data for Croatia.

The release in Bosnia-Herzegovina's Bosniak-Croat part, where the movie was partly shot, was originally scheduled for December 7, 2007, but one day before the premiere, it had to be postponed for a week due to technical difficulties. The movie was finally released on December 14, 2007, with a premiere showing at Sarajevo's Meeting Point cinema attended by screenwriter Zlatko Topčić, film directors Danis Tanović and Elmir Jukić, as well as politician Bakir Izetbegović, among others. The premiere was also attended by local actors Miraj Grbić, Snežana Marković, and Semir Krivić, all of whom had minor roles in the movie as Thug #1, Una, and Roadhouse Waiter, respectively. Translated as Lov u Bosni (Hunting in Bosnia), the movie garnered generally positive reviews in the country's Bosniak media with Dnevni Avaz reviewer Anila Gajević extolling its "important political message" and further seeing the movie as an example of "American fiction with emphasized altruism".

In mid-January 2008, the movie was released in the country's Serbian part, where audiences largely ignored it with a premiere in Banja Luka's Kozara theater attended by fewer than 15 people. The reviews in the country's Serb media were generally negative: Nezavisne novine's Davor Pavlović refers to the film as being "poorly directed" and concludes that its main flaws lay in "neither being able to treat the subject matter with sufficient seriousness nor to raise its dramaturgical level above that of a typical Hollywood action movie".

== Premieres ==
The Hunting Party has been released around the world, premiering in a number of countries in 2007 and 2008:

Premieres
Date	Country	Notes
September 7, 2007	United States	Initially shown on four screens in NYC and LA; first run ended after six weeks.
September 14, 2007	Turkey	Released as Av Partisi; grossed US$424,048 over two months.
October 4, 2007	Israel	(No Israeli box office data is currently available.)
November 29, 2007	Germany	Released as Hunting Party – Wenn der Jäger zum Gejagten wird ("When the Hunter Becomes the Hunted"); grossed US$203,705 in one month.
November 29, 2007	Croatia	
December 14, 2007	Bosnia and Herzegovina	Date release in Federation of Bosnia and Herzegovina; released in mid-January 2008 in Republika Srpska.
December 27, 2007	Austria	The movie lasted in the theatres until roughly mid-January 2008, making only US$52,967.
January 3, 2008	Slovenia	
January 4, 2008	Spain	
January 25, 2008	Romania	
January 31, 2008	Russia	
March 6, 2008	Portugal	
March 13, 2008	Argentina	
April 30, 2008	Italy	
May 10, 2008	Japan	
August 8, 2008	Brazil	
December 12, 2008	India	

== Soundtrack ==
Shepard selected LA-based film composer Rolfe Kent to provide a full orchestral score. Kent responded to Shepard's request for strong local color in the soundtrack by the use of Balkan motifs and percussion instruments. Kent also made use of Algerian singer Rachid Taha's song "Barra Barra" from his album Made in Medina, which had already featured in the 2001 film Black Hawk Down, and "Pusti pusti modu" by Bosnian singer Zdravko Čolić, as well as material by Brian Keane with Omar Faruk Tekbilek. The soundtrack album was released on Lakeshore Records in 2007.

== See also ==
- Gonzo journalism
