= Gostilj =

Gostilj may refer to:

- Gostilj, Bosnia and Herzegovina, a village near Srebrenica
- Gostilj, Montenegro, a village near Podgorica
