= Operation Hydra =

Operation Hydra may refer to:

- Operation Hydra (1943), a bombing of Peenemünde in World War II
- Operation Hydra (Yugoslavia), a 1942 SOE operation in Yugoslavia
