= Ćehotina =

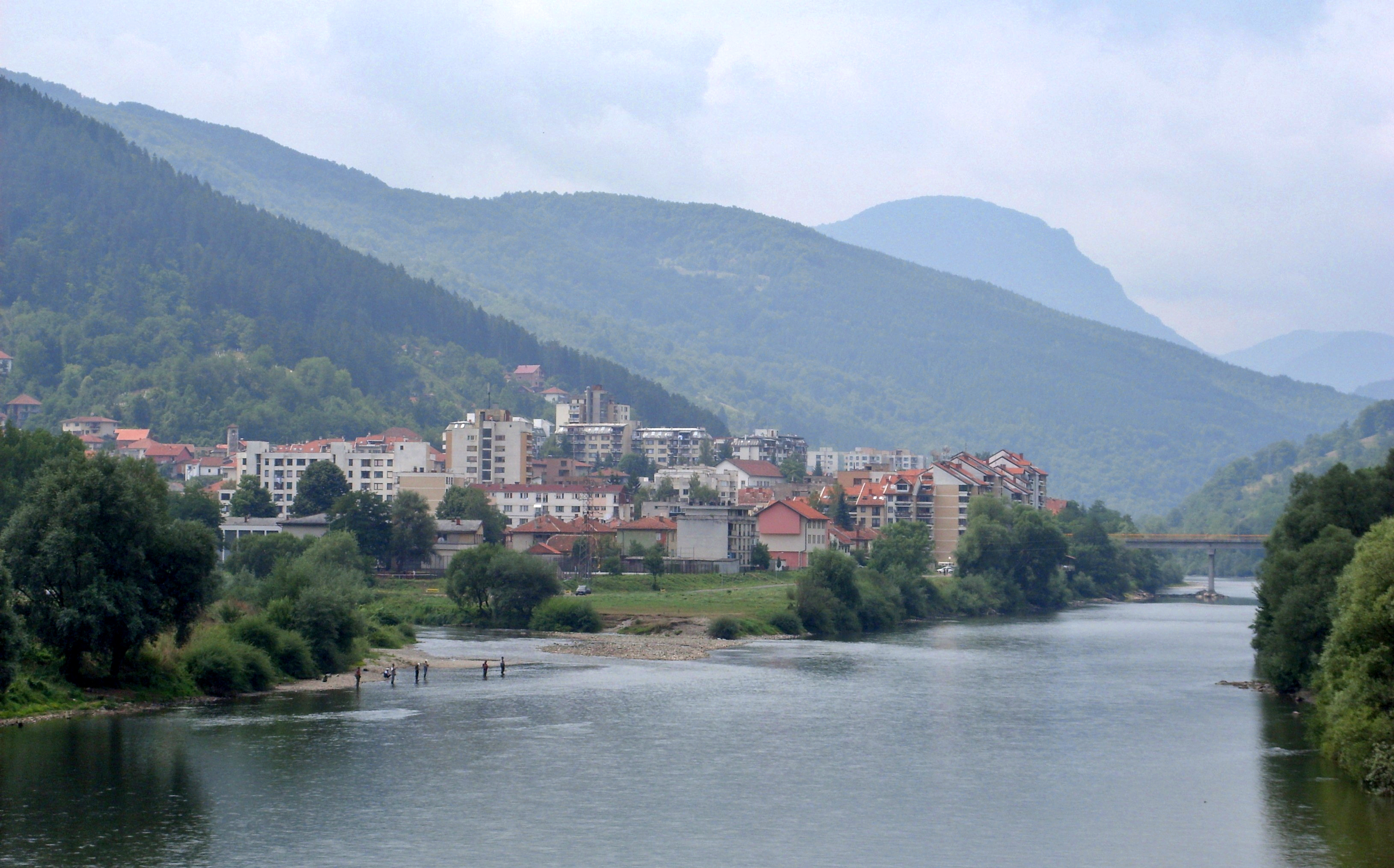
- Confluence of the Ćehotina and Drina Rivers

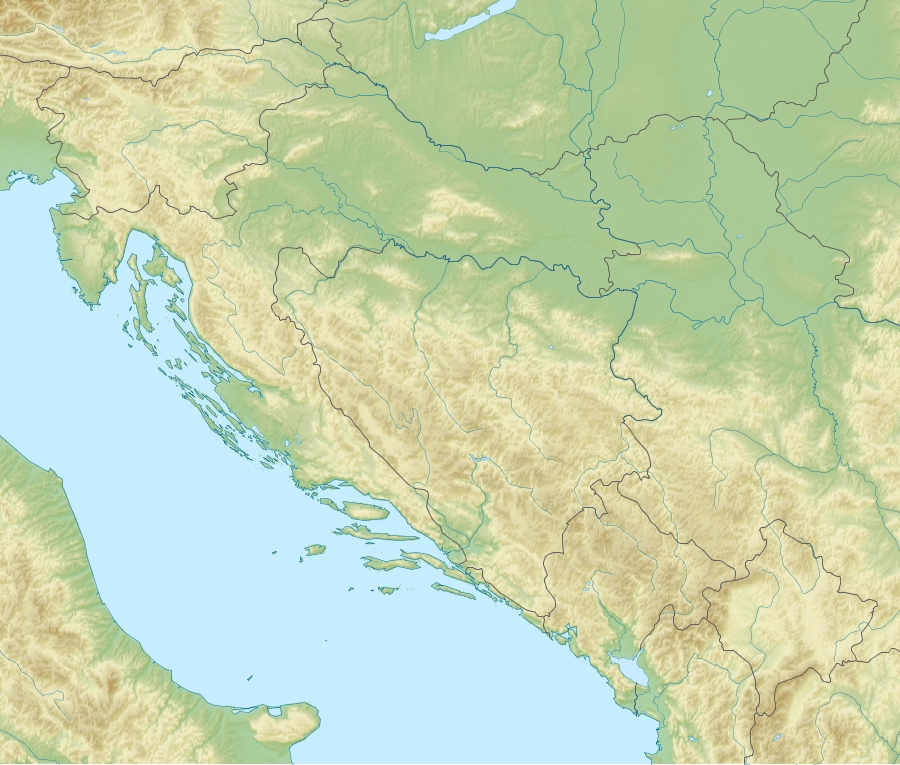
- Location within Dinaric Alps

Location
- Country: Montenegro, Bosnia and Herzegovina

Physical characteristics
- Mouth
  - location: Drina
  - coordinates: 43°30′42″N 18°46′34″E
- Length: 125 km (78 mi)
- Basin size: 1,237 km^{2} (478 sq mi)

Basin features
- Progression: Drina→ Sava→ Danube→ Black Sea

The Ćehotina (Serbian Cyrillic: Ћеxотина, pronounced [tɕɛ̌xɔtina]), also known as the Ćeotina, Ćotina or Čehotina, is a 125 kilometres (78 mi) long river in Montenegro and Bosnia and Herzegovina. It is a right bank tributary of the Drina river.

== Course ==
The Ćehotina originates from the two streams in the Montenegrin region of Donji Kolašin, near the border with Serbia. It flows to the northwest, with many bends and curves, as it flows through the high, mountain region. The river almost has no settlements along its banks (except for the village of Vrulje), before it passes the eastern slopes of the Korijeni mountain and enters the Pljevaljska kotlina (Cyrillic: Пљеваљска котлина; Depression of Pljevlja). There, it flows through the Pljevlja coal basin and the city of Pljevlja itself, and continues to the region of Podgora, next to the villages of Radosavec, Židovići, Donja Brvenica and the small town of Gradac. The river flows between the region of Bukovica to the north and the northern tip of the Ljubišnja mountain and for a few kilometers forms the border between Serbia and Montenegro and Bosnia and Herzegovina. It continues next to the villages of Vikoč, Falovići, Godijeno and Brusina, before it empties into the Drina. The city of Foča is built at its confluence.

== Characteristics ==
The Ćehotina flows for 100 km in Montenegro, and 25 in Bosnia and Herzegovina.

It has no major tributaries, most important being the Voloder, which flows into the Ćehotina near Gradac.

The river has considerable hydroelectricity potential, but none of it is being used. It belongs to the Black Sea drainage basin, its own drainage area covers 1,237 km^{2}, and it's not navigable.

== In popular culture ==
Young Montenegrin band "Autogeni Trening" (Autogenic Training) have a song titled "Ćehotina".

One of the most beautiful sevdalinka (type of folk song in Bosnia and Herzegovina) is "Dvije su se vode zavadile" ("Two rivers have a quarrel"). In that song the river Ćehotina and the river Drina, who converge in the center of the city of Foča, are presented as two human females who conduct a dispute about which one is the prouder one. After the river Ćehotina criticizes Drina's pride as unjustified because it is the river Ćehotina that is able to flood half of Foča, the river Drina replies that the Ćehotina shall just wait until tomorrow at noon when the Drina intends to flood the city of Foča, taking with it the palace of Aladža and the beautiful girl that lives therein. The most famous interpretation is sung by sevdah singer Zehra Deović who is herself a native of the city of Foča. Another notable interpretation is sung by Zaim Imamović who is also a famous Bosnian sevdah singer.

== See also ==
- List of rivers of Bosnia and Herzegovina
