= Robert St. John =

American newspaper publisher (1902–2003)

Robert William St. John
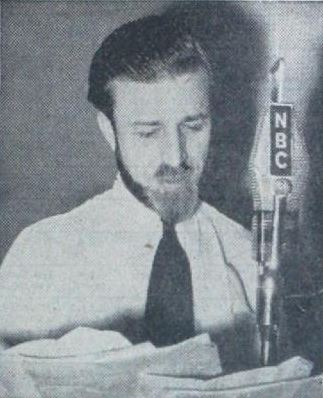
- St. John broadcasting on NBC Radio
- Born: March 9, 1902 Oak Park, Illinois, US
- Died: February 6, 2003 (aged 100) Waldorf, Maryland, US
- Occupation: Author, broadcaster, journalist
- Spouses: Eda Guerrieri; Ruth Bass

Robert William St. John (March 9, 1902 – February 6, 2003) was an American writer, who wrote at least 23 books, broadcaster, and journalist.

== Biography ==
=== Early life ===
Robert William St. John was born on March 9, 1902, in Chicago. His mother Amy (nee Archer) was a nurse, and his father John, a pharmacist. He had one brother, Archer, who was two years younger. In 1910, his family moved to the well-to-do suburban Oak Park, Illinois. There, St. John attended Oak Park River Forest High School, where he was in a writing class with Ernest Hemingway. According to a Los Angeles Times interview he gave in 1994, their teacher kept them both after class one day to tell them they had no future in writing: "Neither one of you will ever learn to write."

St. John's father died from cancer in 1917, and the mother remarried (he had a half brother from his mother's second marriage), while St. John, at age 16, lied about his age to enlist in the Navy during World War I.

=== Investigative Reporter ===
On his return from France, St. John became the campus correspondent for the Hartford Courant while attending Trinity College in Hartford, Connecticut. But he was soon expelled for trying to expose the college president's censorship of an outspoken English professor.

Abandoning formal education, St. John pursued journalism as a reporter for the Chicago Daily News and the Chicago American. In 1923, with his younger brother Archer St. John (1904–1955), he co-founded the Cicero Tribune in suburban Cicero, Illinois, and at 21, became the youngest editor-publisher in the United States. A short while after that his brother Archer founded the Berwyn Tribune, in the city of Berwyn near Cicero.

St. John published a series of exposés about Cicero brothels and other operations of gangster Al Capone. In response, on April 6, 1925, he was accosted by four Capone goons and beaten severely. He brashly complained to the police, and was invited back the next day to meet Capone in person. The gang leader offered St. John money—which the reporter rejected—and apologized, saying he liked newsmen and considered the exposés a form of advertising. Soon after these incidents, Capone purchased the Cicero Tribune in order to silence St. John. Faced with an obviously impossible situation, St. John quit and went into partnership with Archer on the Berwyn paper. In 1927, St. John left the Berwyn Tribune for a job as managing editor of a paper in Rutland, Vermont. At that point, the brothers parted ways. Archer founded St. John Publications in 1947.

=== Associated Press ===
St. John joined the Associated Press and covered Franklin D. Roosevelt's first presidential campaign, then farmed for six years with his wife Eda in New Hampshire. In 1939, St. John moved to Europe to report on the imminent war for the Associated Press.

For two years, St. John reported from the Balkans. The persecution of Jews that he witnessed during that period helped instill in him a deep and enduring interest in Israel, Jewish issues and anti-Semitism. Covering the January 1941 pogrom in Bucharest, when Romanian fascists tortured and killed about 170 Jews, was watershed experience for him. St. John hid a Jewish editor's family as a Christian fascist group called "The Brotherhood of the Archangel, Michael" rounded up several hundred Jews in the city. The next morning, St. John learned what had happened. The Jews were taken to a stockyard at the edge of the city. They were stripped naked and led up the ramp where cattle were slaughtered. One by one they were clubbed and their throats were slit. Their bleeding corpses were then hung on the meat hooks.

"We sat around the table and I did more thinking than I had ever done before," St. John says in a film, many years later. "I realized that I had been born into a group that had been doing this sort of thing for 2,000 years and therefore had to bear some of the responsibility... for what had happened. They were Christians. They sang Christian hymns as they committed these atrocities. And so I promised myself that if I lived out what was happening in Rumania, if I lived out World War II, I would live out my life trying to atone for the sins of my group... for the atrocities committed in Bucharest by men born Christian and presumably exposed to Christian precepts they had so barbarically violated".

He fled from Belgrade to Cairo with Terence Atherton and 2 other newsmen when Hitler's troops overran Yugoslavia He was later wounded in the right leg by shrapnel while riding in a Greek troop train. He returned home to New York City, where he wrote "what I saw and smelled and heard." The resulting book, From the Land of Silent People, published in 1942, was his first, and a bestseller.

=== NBC Radio ===
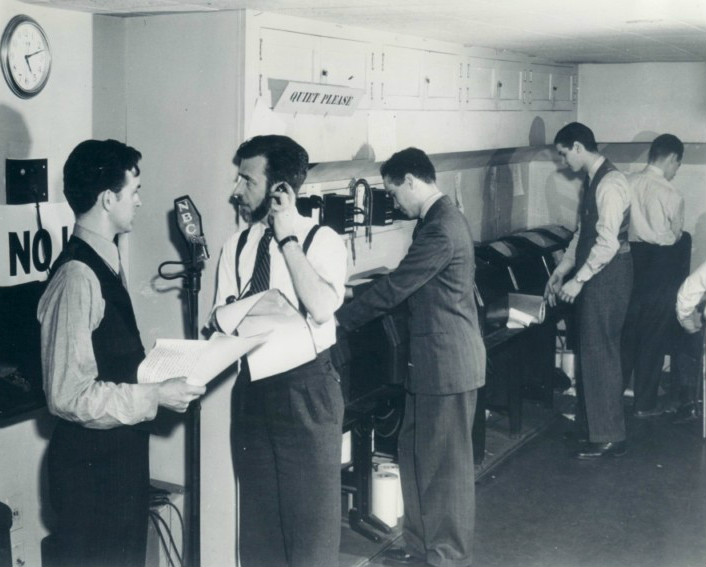
In the NBC radio newsroom in New York, Robert St. John (at microphone) watches the clock as he prepares to interrupt regular programming with a news bulletin (December 1941).

After writing the book, St. John switched to broadcast reporting for NBC Radio, moving in 1942 to head its London bureau. He covered the Blitz, the Nazi bombing of the city, for a year before returning to Washington, D.C., and then went New York City to broadcast general war news. His broadcast brought the Americans the news about D Day, on June 6, 1944, and he was the first to announce the end of the Second World War on August 12, 1945.

When he wrote a second book on Yugoslavia, The Silent People Speak in 1948, C. L. Sulzberger wrote a review in The New York Times Book Review suggesting that his use of Communist sources made him "a subconscious follower of the 'party line.'"

Although intimates said St. John never liked communism, he became one of 151 writers, performers, directors and others listed in the 1950 Red Channels, an American Business Consultants' report of purported communist influence in radio and television, and NBC fired him.

=== Author ===
St. John spent the next fifteen years based in Switzerland, before returning to the United States, always travelling the world to write and broadcast major events on radio or in books and magazines. His work included research around the globe for the World Book Encyclopedia.

He became regarded as a Middle East specialist after covering the war for Israeli independence. St. John covered the Eichmann trial and five Arab-Israeli wars, including the 1982 Lebanon War. At that time, he was eighty, by far the oldest of the hundreds of reporters on hand, and the only one who had covered all four previous Arab-Israeli conflicts. He wrote a dozen or so books about the Middle East and Judaism, including well-reviewed biographies of David Ben-Gurion and Gamal Abdel Nasser. An eloquent non-Jewish spokesman for Jewish causes, he maintained close ties with the Jewish state and was honored by Jewish and Israeli institutions. David Ben-Gurion, Israel's first Prime Minister, called him "our goyisher Zionist".

A few of his books were non-documentary. The story of Rudolf Kastner, the Zionist Romanian-Hungarian Jewish leader who was accused of betraying his people to the Nazis, was the base upon which he built his fictional novel The Man who Played God (Doubleday, 1962).

In all he wrote 23 books, the last of which was an autobiography published in the year 2002, when he celebrated his one-hundredth birthday. He also wrote many articles, some of which got published as booklets.

St. John was married twice. He was first married to Eda Guerrieri (marriage dissolved), and married Ruth Bass in 1965. He died in Waldorf, Maryland on February 6, 2003.

== Books ==
- From the Land of Silent People (Doubleday, Doran & Co. Inc., 1942)
- It's Always Tomorrow (Doubleday, Doran and Co. Inc., 1944)
- Movie Lot to Beachhead: The Motion Picture Goes to War and Prepares for the Future (Together with the editors of Look magazine) (Doubleday, 1945)
- The Silent People Speak (Doubleday & Co., 1948)
- Shalom Means Peace (Doubleday, 1949)
- Tongue of the Prophets; The Life Story of Eliezer Ben Yehuda (Greenwood Press 1972, Doubleday & Co., 1952)
- This Was My World (Doubleday & Co. Inc., 1953)
- Through Malan's Africa (Doubleday, 1954)
- Ben-Gurion: The Biography of an Extraordinary Man (Doubleday, 1959)
- The Boss: the Story of Gamal Abdel Nasser (McGraw-Hill, 1960)
- Foreign Correspondent (Hutchinson, 1960)
- Builder of Israel; The Story of Ben-Gurion (Doubleday, 1961)
- Israel (together with the editors of Life-Chicago) (Time Inc., 1962)
- They Came From Everywhere: Twelve Who Helped Mold Modern Israel (Coward-McCann, 1962)
- The Man Who Played God (Doubleday, 1962)
- Roll Jordan Roll, The Life Story of a River and Its People (Doubleday, 1965)
- Encyclopedia of Radio and Television Broadcasting: The Man Behind the Microphone (Cathedral Square Pub. Co., 1968)
- Jews, Justice, and Judaism; A Narrative of the Role Played by the Bible People Shaping American History (Doubleday, 1969)
- Once Around Lightly (Doubleday, 1969)
- Ben-Gurion: A Biography (Doubleday, 1971)
- Eban - Biography of Abba Eban (W.H. Allen, 1973) (Doubleday, 1972)
- Social Justice: The Jewish Contribution to America

=== Booklets ===
- "Facts and Faces, a collection of the 10 best personality sketches out of the 1000 broadcasts by Mr. St. John over WEAF since 1942" (WEAF-NBC, 194?)
- What basic questions divide Russia and the United States? Town meeting 12 (George Fielding Eliot, Robert St. John) (The Town Hall, Inc., 1946)
- How can we meet the challenge of Russia's expansion in Europe? Town meeting 13 (George Vernon Denny, Allen Dulles, Robert St. John, Ellis Gibbs Arnall, James Frank Dobie) (The Town Hall, Inc., 1948)
