= Kristina Krepela =

Croatian actress

- Born: 4 September 1979 (age 47); Zagreb, SR Croatia, SFR Yugoslavia
- Years active: 2003–present

Kristina Krepela (born 4 September 1979) is a Croatian actress, the best known for playing in movies La Femme Musketeer and The Hunting Party and in telenovela Ne daj se, Nina, the Croatian version of Ugly Betty.

== Career ==
Krepela trained on the Academy of Dramatic Arts in Zagreb.

Her first role was in the short-movie Leptir (Butterfly), in 2003. She played the Spanish Infanta Maria Theresa in Hallmark Channel television movie La Femme Musketeer, along with Gérard Depardieu, Michael York, Nastassja Kinski, John Rhys-Davies and Susie Amy.

She returned to Zagreb, taking role of Ivana in Croatian telenovela Ljubav u zaledju (Love in the Offside). In 2007, she had a little appearance in the movie The Hunting Party, along with Richard Gere.

Since October 2007, Krepela has played Barbara in Ne daj se, Nina (Don't Give Up, Nina), the Croatian version of Ugly Betty.

== Filmography ==
Year	Project	Role	Notes
2003	Leptir (Butterfly)	Mother	Film
2004	La Femme Musketeer	Princess Maria Theresa	TV film; along with Michael York, Gérard Depardieu, Nastassja Kinski, John Rhys-Davies and Susie Amy.
2005	Ljubav u zaledju (Love in the Offside)	Ivana	Telenovela
2007	The Hunting Party	Marda	Film, along with Richard Gere.
2007-2008	Ne daj se, Nina (Don't Give Up, Nina)	Barbara Vidic	Telenovela, re-make of Ugly Betty.
2010	Neke druge price (Some Other Stories)	Gost na partiju 7	Anthology: "Hrvatska prica"
2010	Bibin svijet	Valerija Valentini	Episode: "Ducan s duplerice"
2011	Stipe u gostima	Darija	Episode: "Nesanica"
2012	Missing	Mother	Episode: "Measure Of A Man"
2012	Game of Thrones	Quartheen Woman	"The Ghost of Harrenhal"
2013	Mahmut ile Meryem (Mahmut & Meryem)	Ceylan	
2013	3 Yol (Crossroads)	Zrinka, Zuleyha	
2013	Frozen	Elsa	Spoken parts (Croatian-language version)
2015	Dig	Miriam	Episode: "Meet The Rosenbergs"
2015	Frozen Fever	Elsa	Spoken parts (Croatian-language version)
2017	Olaf's Frozen Adventure	Elsa	Spoken parts (Croatian-language version)
