= Bobovo, Pljevlja =

Bobovo Бобово
- Village
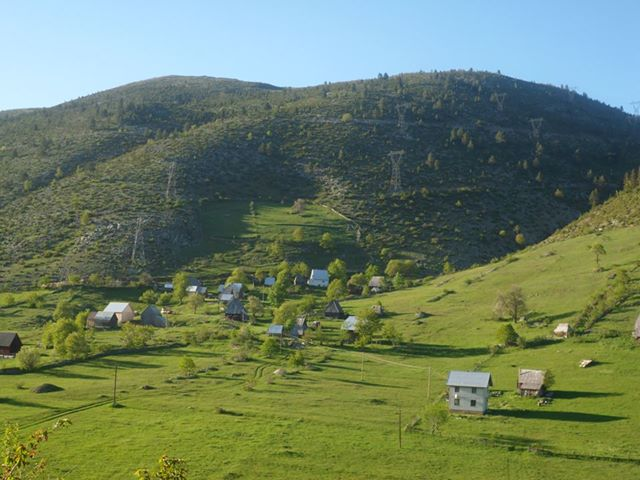

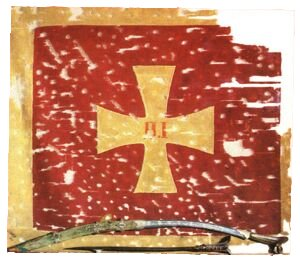
- Flag

- Location within Montenegro
- Country: Montenegro
- Region: Northern
- Municipality: Pljevlja

Population (2011)
  - Total: 103
- Time zone: UTC+1 (CET)
  - Summer (DST): UTC+2 (CEST)

Bobovo (Montenegrin Cyrillic: Бобово) is a small village in the municipality of Pljevlja, Montenegro.

== Demographics ==
According to the 2003 census, the village had a population of 101 people.

According to the 2011 census, its population was 103.

Ethnicity in 2011
Ethnicity	Number	Percentage
Serbs	69	67.0%
Montenegrins	32	31.1%
other/undeclared	2	1.9%
Total	103	100%
