= Operation Hydra (Yugoslavia) =

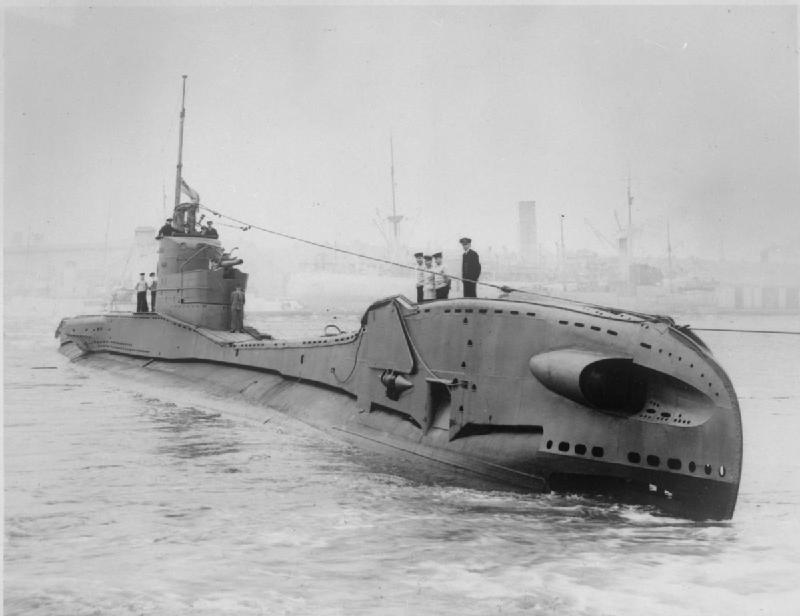
HMSM THORN underway on the River Mersey

Operation Hydra was a failed British attempt during World War II in Yugoslavia to develop contact with the Partisans led by Josip Broz Tito, in Montenegro in February 1942.

Two British Special Operations Executive agents and an officer of the Royal Yugoslav Air Force were put ashore at Perazića Do, just north of Petrovac.

On 4 February the three agents went ashore from the British submarine HMS Thorn. They were Major Terence Atherton (a former journalist and agent in Belgrade), Lieutenant Radoje Nedeljković of the Yugoslav Royal Air Force and Sergeant Patrick O'Donovan, wireless operator.

Their orders were not to contact Draža Mihailović, or to locate SOE agent Duane "Bill" Hudson, who had been out of radio contact for over two months. Instead, Atherton was "to establish a safe area on the coast near Petrovac to which supplies and a further mission or missions could be sent...the original operation order had expressly forbidden the mission to leave Montenegro."

The operation failed completely. The presence of the Yugoslav officer implied links to the royalist Chetniks, which is suggested to have caused Tito to suspect the British of being spies. Nothing beneficial arose, therefore, and the British agents left Tito. They vanished soon thereafter, as did the large amount of gold and Italian money that they carried.

At Mihailović's headquarters Hudson's intervention prompted Mihailović to order a formal inquiry into the fate of the Atherton mission. A summary of the results of this investigation was sent by Hudson to SOE office in Cairo. According to the results of the inquiry, the most probable culprit for Atherton's death was četnik leader Spasoje Dakić.

Atherton and O'Donovan, his radio operator, left Čelebić on 22 April for the village of Tatarevina, and were escorted part of the way by Dakić. They were never seen again. Dakić, who later appeared at Mihailović's headquarters in possession of Atherton's binoculars, and wearing his boots, had probably murdered both men and stolen the large quantity of gold sovereigns which Atherton was carrying. He was only 'nominally a Mihailović Cetnik', but Hudson had the impression that Mihailović 'knew something about the matter'. This summary completed such evidence as Hudson was able to assemble up to July 1942. Mihailović's first reaction to all these happenings was to insinuate to London, as an astute propaganda move, that the British members of the party had been killed by Partisans. He stated this in a message, dated 27 May, at a moment when in reality he and the British military authorities in Cairo had every reason to believe that Atherton was alive. At the end of the signal Mihailović announced that, because of these murders, 'he had declared open warfare on all Partisans'.
