= The Man Who Played God (novel) =

Novel by Robert St. John

- 1962 hardcover edition
- Author: Robert St. John
- Language: English
- Genre: Literary fiction
- Set in: 1944-1956
- Published: 1962
- Publisher: Doubleday, NY
- Publication place: United States
- Media type: Print: hardback, paperback
- Pages: 471 (first edition)
- ISBN: 9781258163983

The Man Who Played God is a 1962 fact-based fiction novel about Hungary and Israel (1944–1956) by American author Robert St. John, who has released several books on Israel. It was published by Doubleday on January 4, 1962.

== Plot ==
The novel chronicles the narrative of the Jews who were apprehended in Hungary during World War II. During the final two years of the war, Andor Horvath, was able to save many lives by courageously negotiating with the Nazis, preventing thousands of deaths.

Horvath led a charmed life and was able to successfully negotiate with Nazis who were greedy for goods and money. In Israel, ten years after the war, his fortunes would change as he is suddenly accused of being a Nazi collaborator who had allowed hundreds of thousands of Jews to die in Hungary.

== Characters ==
Robert St. John based his fictitious novel on the reality of his central character, Andor Horvath, a Zionist Romanian-Hungarian Jewish leader. There are many other characters that demonstrate how Jews were lulled into a sense of false security, and how they were methodically exterminated at the Auschwitz concentration camp.

== Reception ==
The American book reviewer Kirkus Reviews found The Man Who Played God by Robert St. John to be "fact and fiction skillfully blended in a holding panoramic novel of the Jews of Hungary".
