= Tatarovina =

- Village
- Location within Montenegro
- Country: Montenegro
- Region: Northern
- Municipality: Pljevlja

Population (2003)
  - Total: 6
- Time zone: UTC+1 (CET)
  - Summer (DST): UTC+2 (CEST)

Tatarovina (Montenegrin Cyrillic: Татаровина) is a village in Pljevlja Municipality, in northern Montenegro.

== Demographics ==
According to the 2003 census, the village had a population of 6 people.
