= Gostilj, Montenegro =

Gostilj Гостиљ
- Village
- Location within Montenegro
- Country: Montenegro
- Municipality: Podgorica

Population (2011)
  - Total: 159
- Time zone: UTC+1 (CET)
  - Summer (DST): UTC+2 (CEST)

Gostilj (Serbian Cyrillic: Гостиљ) is a village in the new Zeta Municipality of Montenegro. Until 2022, it was part of Podgorica Municipality.

== Demographics ==
According to the 2011 census, its population was 159.

Ethnicity in 2011
Ethnicity	Number	Percentage
Montenegrins	102	64.2%
Serbs	44	27.7%
other/undeclared	13	8.2%
Total	159	100%
