= Čelebići, Foča =

Čelebići
- Village
- Location within Bosnia and Herzegovina
- Coordinates: 43°23′02″N 18°58′30″E
- Country: Bosnia and Herzegovina
- Entity: Republika Srpska
- Municipality: Foča
- Time zone: UTC+1 (CET)
  - Summer (DST): UTC+2 (CEST)

Čelebići (Serbian Cyrillic: Челебићи) is a village in the municipality of Foča, Republika Srpska, Bosnia and Herzegovina.
