= Institute of History =

Institute of History may refer to:

- Institute of History Sarajevo, in Bosnia and Herzegovina
- Institute of History Belgrade, in Serbia
- Institute of Contemporary History Belgrade, in Serbia
- Institute of Historical Research, (IHR), School of Advanced Study, in UK
- Suffolk Institute of Archaeology & History, in UK
- Gilder Lehrman Institute of American History, in US
- Omohundro Institute of Early American History and Culture, in US
- Albany Institute of History & Art
- Pan American Institute of Geography and History
- Institute for Historical Review, in US (Holocaust denial)
- Institute of History of Ukraine, in Ukraine
- Institute of history, ethnology and right, in Ukraine
- Institute of History of Azerbaijan National Academy of Sciences, in Azerbaijan
- Saint Petersburg Institute of History, in Russia
- Norwegian Institute of Local History, in Norway
- Institute of Bavarian History, in Germany
- Institute of Contemporary History (Munich), in Germany
- Kaiser Wilhelm Institute for German History
- A.D. Xenopol Institute of History
- Huygens Institute for the History of the Netherlands
- National Institute of Korean History
- Institute of Baltic Region History and Archaeology
- Lithuanian Institute of History
- Institute for the History of Ancient Civilizations
- Institute of History of Nicaragua and Central America

== Other ==
- Institute for the History of Psychiatry
- International Institute of Social History
- Army Institute of Military History, in Pakistan
- Institute of History of the Party (Ukraine)
- Institute of Political History
- Christian History Institute
- Netherlands Institute for Art History
- Max Planck Institute for the Science of Human History
- Wellcome Institute for the History of Medicine
- Institute for History of Musical Reception and Interpretation
- London Museum and Institute of Natural History
- Institute of Archaeology and Art History, Cluj-Napoca

== See also ==
- Institute of Contemporary History (disambiguation)
