= Charles Armstrong (British Army officer) =

British Army officer (1897–1985)

Brigadier Charles Douglas Armstrong CBE DSO MC
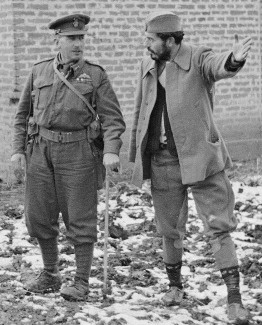
- Brigadier Charles Armstrong with Chetnik officer Predrag Raković, autumn 1943.
- Born: 11 June 1897
- Died: 11 December 1985 (aged 88)
- Military career
- Allegiance: United Kingdom
- Branch: British Army
- Rank: Brigadier
- Service number: 11740
- Units: East Surrey Regiment; Machine Gun Corps; Special Operations Executive
- Commands: 1/6th Battalion, East Surrey Regiment; 70th (Young Soldiers') Battalion, Duke of Wellington's Regiment; 1st Battalion, Duke of Wellington's Regiment
- Conflicts: World War I Russian Civil War; World War II
- Awards: Commander of the Order of the British Empire; Distinguished Service Order; Military Cross

Brigadier Charles Douglas Armstrong CBE DSO MC (11 June 1897 – 11 December 1985) was a British Army officer in World War I and World War II. In the latter conflict he was the head of the British Special Operations Executive (SOE) liaison mission to the Chetnik forces of Draža Mihailović in Yugoslavia from July 1943 to early 1944.

== Early life ==
Armstrong was born on 11 June 1897 and was educated at Cheltenham College. After attending the Royal Military College, Sandhurst, he was commissioned into the East Surrey Regiment in April 1915 during the First World War. Seconded to the Machine Gun Corps, he served in France from 1916 to 1918, where he was twice wounded and, in March 1918, made a prisoner of war.

Repatriated in December 1918, by which time the war was over due to the armistice with Germany, he served in North Russia during the Russian Civil War in 1919 and was awarded the Military Cross (MC) for gallantry. The citation for his MC, appearing in The London Gazette in January 1920, reads as follows:

For gallantry and devotion to duty during operations of 10th-11th August, 1919. At Sludka, on 10th August, he formed a rear-guard defence with his two guns against a party of sailors which had landed and cut off the main body from reserves. He handled his guns with great skill. At the crossing of the Sheika also he did excellent work with his guns.

He was present in Mesopotamia 1920-21 and on the Indian North West Frontier 1930-31, serving much of his inter-war service with the 1st Battalion, East Surrey Regiment in Egypt, Sudan, Hong Kong and India.

== Second World War ==
In October 1939, a month after the outbreak of the Second World War, Armstrong, now a major, went to France with the 1st Battalion, East Surrey Regiment, before taking command of the 1/6th Battalion in April 1940 as a temporary lieutenant colonel. Evacuated from Dunkirk a month later, he remained in command of the battalion until April 1942. In October 1940 he received the Distinguished Service Order in recognition of his services in France.

In April 1942 he was posted to command the 70th (Young Soldiers) Battalion, and later 1st Battalion, the Duke of Wellington's Regiment which, in early 1943 he took to North Africa.

=== Mission to Chetniks ===
In July 1943 Armstrong was appointed Brigadier in command of the SOE sponsored Military Mission to the Chetniks, a Serbian nationalist and royalist force led by General Draža Mihailović, and one of the principal resistance movements in Axis occupied Yugoslavia. According to some sources, he was carefully selected for this mission because of his lack of political contacts or skill. Together with members of his mission, Armstrong parachuted into Yugoslavia at the end of September 1943. Before he was dispatched to Chetnik headquarters, a previous member of British mission with the Chetniks, Colonel Bailey, advised him that the Chetniks were angry and that Mihailović "won't hear of British anymore". The United Kingdom had provided substantial supplies to Yugoslav Communist forces who opposed the Chetniks, while the BBC repeatedly gave the Communist forces credit for the anti-Axis actions of Chetniks, especially during September and October 1943. For example, when Chetniks attacked the German garrison in Prijepolje on 11 September, killed 200 German soldiers and captured the town, the BBC credited Tito's Communist Partisans with the victory.

==== Witness to Chetnik anti-Axis actions, credited to Partisans by BBC ====
Less than a week after Armstrong arrived at Chetnik headquarters he, Albert Seitz, head of the USA Mission with the Chetniks, and Hudson saw a successful Chetnik attack on Višegrad and the destruction of the railway bridge across Drina. Armstrong and Seitz took part in the Chetnik action against Axis controlled units protecting the railway bridge over Drina in Višegrad. At the beginning of October 1943, based on Armstrong's instructions, Mihailović and his Chetniks organized an attack on Višegrad and during the battle captured the town and destroyed the railway bridge across the river Drina on the Sarajevo-Užice railway. This bridge was the longest bridge in Axis occupied Yugoslavia destroyed by rebel guerillas. In this attack about 2,500 Chetniks killed about 350 Ustaše and German soldiers and captured a lot of ammunition and arms. Before the Chetniks stormed into Višegrad, they first destroyed four smaller bridges in Mokra Gora. The bridge in Višegrad was destroyed with help of British sappers commanded by British Major Archie Jack. British media, including the BBC, credited Yugoslav Communist Partisans for this successful action by the Chetniks. In spite of protests, including from Kenneth Pickthorn and officials of the Yugoslav government in exile in London, the BBC did not make any corrections.

After the capture of Višegrad, the Chetniks also captured Rogatica on 14 and 15 October and killed more than 200 Axis soldiers. The BBC again credited Communist forces with this success. In November 1943 the Chetniks attacked Axis positions at Nova Varoš and Kalna, and both actions were again attributed to Communists by the BBC. Archival evidence, published in 1980 for the first time, confirms that some actions against Axis carried by Mihailović and his Chetniks with Armstrong were mistakenly credited to Tito and his Communist forces. Armstrong sent an angry protest to the BBC insisting on the publication of correct information, to no avail. Mihailović was enraged.

Some authors blame the persistent misreporting of BBC and attribution of successful Chetnik anti-Axis actions to Communists on a supposed strong network of Soviet spies in the BBC and the British Ministry of Information. This misreporting changed British public opinion and even influenced some high-ranking officials. But Churchill's reason was the evidence of Ultra decrypts from the Government Code and Cipher School in Bletchley Park (which he read; they were secret until the 1970s) that Tito's Partisans were a "much more effective and reliable ally in the war against Germany"; see Yugoslavia and the Allies.

==== Tensions between American and British mission ====
Almost as soon as he reached Chetnik headquarters, the relation of British mission toward Mihailović significantly deteriorated and tensions between American and British mission began to develop, with Armstrong seen as blatantly anti-OSS.

==== Chetniks ignore Armstrong's orders to destroy bridges ====
Armstrong inherited his predecessor’s (Colonel Bailey) task to convince Mihailovic to increase his anti-Axis activities without providing him with adequate supplies. Armstrong and Albert Seitz, who headed the American Mission with the Chetniks, took part in the Chetnik action against Axis controlled units protecting the railway bridge over Drina in Višegrad. Until December 1943 the British army delivered only 30 tons of arms to Chetniks and 18,000 tons to the Communist Partisans, who used many British arms to attack Chetniks.

Poor Mihailovic had not got the weapons to fight the Germans with all their modern weapons: his supply depended on what his forces could capture. I remember particularly two air-drops at my HQ, one consisted mainly of gumboots [rubber boots], the other of office equipment.

— Charles Douglas Armstrong

Armstrong refused to participate in the Ba Congress held between 25 and 28 January 1944 because he was dissatisfied with the refusal of the Chetniks to follow British requests to perform two sabotages against the Germans. Armstrong insisted that Chetniks should destroy bridges over river Morava and river Ibar near Raška as condition for his participation at the Congress.

Leaving Yugoslavia, Armstrong returned to England and, in June 1944, took command of the British Airborne Liaison Unit to the Polish Parachute Brigade. He remained in the UK for the remainder of the war.

== 1945 and after ==
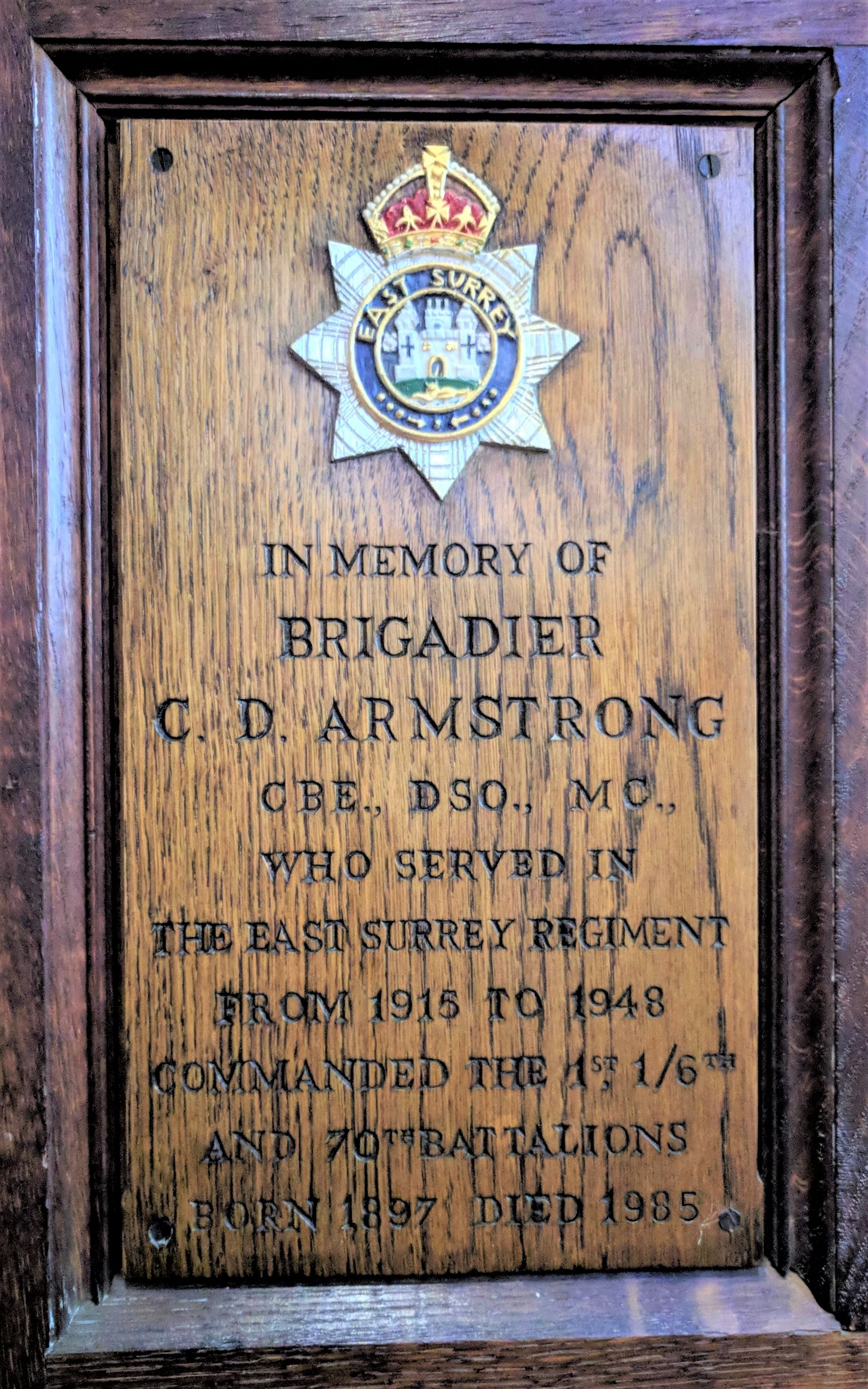
Memorial plaque to Armstrong in All Saints Church, Kingston upon Thames, Surrey.

In January 1945 Armstrong was made a Commander of the Order of the British Empire (CBE) for his war services. In August 1945, now a substantive Lieutenant Colonel, he took command of the 1st Battalion, East Surrey Regiment in Austria, returning to England in November 1946 to command a prisoner of war camp for Germans. He retired in December 1948 with the honorary rank of Brigadier.

In retirement he lived in Camberley, Surrey and was a member of the Special Forces Club. He died on 11 December 1985, at the age of 88. There is a memorial plaque to Armstrong in the East Surrey Regiment Chapel in All Saints Church, Kingston upon Thames.

== Bibliography ==
- Iatrides, John O. (14 July 2014). Ambassador MacVeagh Reports: Greece, 1933-1947. Princeton University Press. ISBN 978-1-4008-5548-3.
- Jeffreys-Jones, Rhodri; Stafford, David (8 April 2014). American-British-Canadian Intelligence Relations, 1939-2000. Routledge. ISBN 978-1-135-27202-9.
- Tillotson, Michael (11 March 2011). SOE and The Resistance: As told in The Times Obituaries. A&C Black. ISBN 978-1-4411-4356-3.
- Ball, Simon J. (16 April 2009). The bitter sea: the struggle for mastery in the Mediterranean, 1935-1949. HarperPress. ISBN 9780007203048.
- Pešić, Miodrag D. (2002). Operation Air Bridge: Serbian Chetniks and the Rescued American Airmen in World War II. Serbian Master's Society. ISBN 978-86-82235-12-5.
- Ford, Kirk (1992). OSS and the Yugoslav resistance, 1943-1945. Texas A&M University Press. ISBN 978-0-89096-517-7.
- Deacon, Richard (1979). The British connection: Russia's manipulation of British individuals and institutions. Hamilton. ISBN 978-0-241-10150-6.
- Latas, Branko (1979). Četnički pokret Draže Mihailovića: 1941-1945. Beogradski izdavačko-grafički zavod.
- Rootham, Jasper; Dimitrijević, Bojan B. (2004). Pucanj u prazno. Institute of Contemporary History, Belgrade. ISBN 9788674030905.
