= 1943 Chetnik offensive in eastern Bosnia =

Eastern Bosnia Offensive
- Part of World War II in Yugoslavia
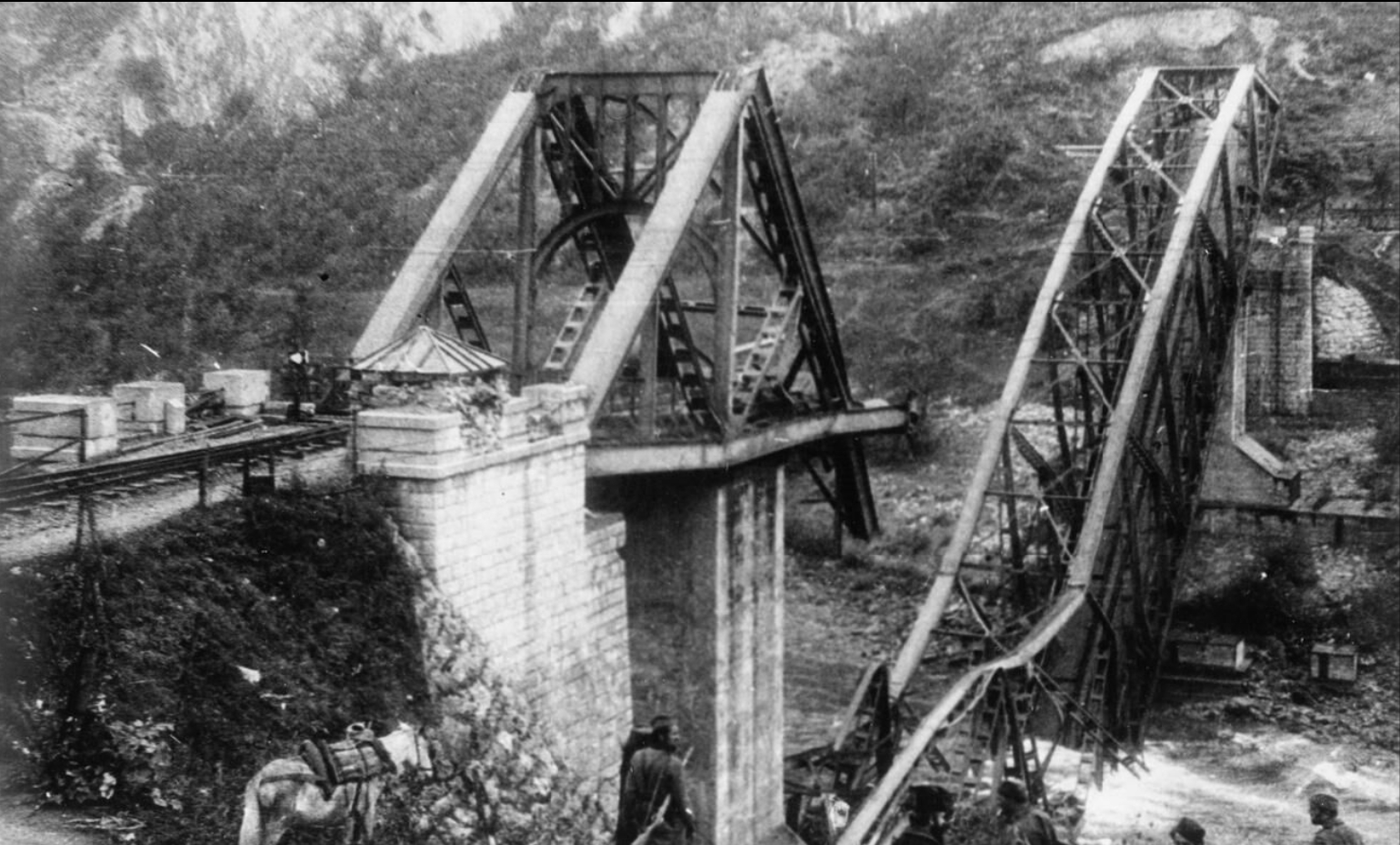
- A destroyed bridge near Višegrad
Date	17 September - 31 October 1943
Location	Zvornik, Rudo, Višegrad, Rogatica, Independent State of Croatia
Result	Yugoslav Partisans victory: Yugoslav Partisans eliminate most Chetnik units from Eastern Bosnia; Initial Chetnik victory: Chetniks force Wehrmacht and Ustaše divisions from most of Eastern Bosnia, capturing 1,803 km²; City of Sarajevo threatened
Territorial changes	Chetniks capture Zvornik, Rudo, Višegrad, Rogatica for a period of time

Belligerents
Chetniks	(Nazi Germany) Germany; Independent State of Croatia	Yugoslav Partisans

Commanders and leaders
Draža Mihailović; Dragoslav Račić; Zaharije Ostojić	(Nazi Germany) Maximilian von Weichs (Independent State of Croatia) Berislav Predojević	Peko Dapčević; Kosta Nađ; Pavle Goranin

Units involved
Chetniks: Cer-Majevica Corps; Drina Corps (elements); 1st Rogatica Brigade	Croatian Home Guard: 2nd Battalion of the 6th Mountain Regiment; (Nazi Germany) 369th Infantry Division: Two companies of the 370th Regiment; platoon of the gendarmerie; (During Battle of Višegrad)	Yugoslav Partisans: 2nd Corps; 3rd Corps; 5th Division; 27th Division

Strength
2,500 to 18,500 soldiers	(Nazi Germany) 1,100 soldiers	unknown

Casualties and losses
50+ killed 65+ injured	(Nazi Germany) 362+ killed (Nazi Germany) 129+ injured (Independent State of Croatia) 43+ killed (Independent State of Croatia) 37+ injured (Independent State of Croatia) 37 POW's	unknown
- More than 2,000 Bosnian Muslim civilians killed

A military offensive was launched by Chetnik forces in 1943 to seize large territories in eastern Bosnia following the capitulation of Italy.

The attack on Višegrad during this offensive was one of the few conflicts of Mihailović's Yugoslav army in the homeland with the Wehrmacht forces in the NDH area. The Chetnik attack on the German-Ustaša garrison in Višegrad on October 5, 1943 was carried out at the request of the Allies, with the aim of showing the Chetnik struggle against the occupiers to the American and British military missions. The attack was observed, among others, by British General Armstrong and American Colonel Albert Seitz.

Višegrad was previously held by the Italians, so after their capitulation it was taken over by the Germans. The Chetniks briefly managed to occupy Višegrad, but it was soon taken over by the NOVJ.

== Background ==
Since 1941, Višegrad has been in the Italian occupation zone. From the beginning of their activity in the NDH, the Chetniks were in cooperation with the Italian occupier.

1.) We want to remain on the best terms with the occupying Italian authorities.

2.) We are only fighting for the expulsion of the Ustaše, who committed many crimes against the Serbian people.

– Report of the commander of the Višegrad Chetnik detachment on negotiations with the commander of the Italian occupation units in Višegrad (November 1, 1941)

At the beginning of September 1943, Italy capitulated, and Višegrad was taken over by the Germans. After the fall of Italy, Allied operations intensified. Allied Brigadier Armstrong came to General Mihailović and demanded that the Chetniks demolish four bridges on Šargan. General Dragoljub Mihailović avoided sabotage in Serbia, because of reprisals, so under pressure from allies, he decided to demolish the bridge near Višegrad in Bosnia. Expecting an imminent allied landing, Chetniks attacked the garrison in Višegrad on October 5, 1943, which, in addition to NDH troops, also housed two Wehrmacht companies.

Višegrad was also aspired by the Yugoslav Partisans, which suddenly grew stronger after the fall of Italy, both numerically and in terms of weapons seized from the Italians. The warring parties competed for possession of the former Italian positions.

== The offensive ==
=== Chetnik September offensive ===
In September 1943, Chetnik units launched an offensive towards Sarajevo. The action was quite successful, as Zvornik (September 17, 1943) and Rudo (September 18, 1943) were liberated on the western side of the Drina.

Large battles were fought on Lim and Prača. The Chetniks defeated the German-Croatian-Muslim front on the line Jabuka - Mesići - Rogatica and in October 1943 they approached Sarajevo, where there were no communists at that time. In German documents that talk about the Chetnik offensive, the defense line of Pale, Mokro, Sokolac is also mentioned. When the Croatian battalion was defeated near Renovica, the Ustaše Home Guards marched to Pale from Sarajevo, following that Germans issued an order to execute the retreating Croats.

=== Battle of Višegrad ===
Under the impression of the weakening of the Axis coalition, Mihailović gathered considerable forces from Serbia (about 15,000 men) and with them launched an attack on the isolated German-Ustaša garrison of Višegrad.

According to the report of American Captain Mansfield, 2,500 Chetniks were attacking Višegrad, while some sources say there were up to 18,500 Chetnik soldiers. The Chetnik forces included the Cer Corps and parts of the Drina Corps commanded by Dragoslav Račić, who led the attack on the right side of the Drina, and the 1st Rogatica Brigade on the left side of the Drina. There were 800 enemy soldiers in the city, and 300 soldiers protecting main bridge over Drina.

Before Chetniks stormed into Višegrad they first destroyed four smaller bridges in Mokra Gora. Two days later Chetniks attacked Axis troops garrisoned in Višegrad. There was a fierce fighting between the Axis garrison and Chetniks. German forces did not actively participate in Višegrad's defence; they withdrew their forces towards Rogatica and were not attacked by the Chetniks. Only the gendarmerie platoon remained in Višegrad. The strongest resistance was on the right side of the Rzav River, where the Muslim milita fought.

The left column, although it attacked energetically, was at first repulsed by fierce enemy fire from the bunkers. During that time, the right column caused panic among the enemy crew by intruding bomb squads into the town itself and by firing launchers at Rodić Brdo.

American lieutenant colonel Albert Seitz, who witnessed the attack, describes that the Chetniks fought bravely:

I saw the Chetniks, somehow protected by the rifle fire of their comrades, storming the enemy's concrete bunkers, removing the fuses from the bombs, holding them for a few seconds (they were set to explode after five seconds) and inserting them through loopholes. It is not a job for many cowards, and many have perished... The next morning, we explored the city after the triumphal entry... Dead Germans and Ustaše covered the streets, with their helmets and black boots

– Albert B. Seitz

The Chetniks, based on Armstrong's instructions, destroyed the railway bridge across river Drina on Sarajevo-Užice railway. This bridge was the longest bridge in Axis-occupied Yugoslavia destroyed by rebel guerrilla. The bridge near Višegrad was destroyed with help of British sappers commanded by British Major Archie Jack.

Mansfield writes that in a four and a half hour battle the Chetniks killed "about 200 Germans", while the rest were "inclined to flee to the north". According to Chetnik sources, the losses were 350 dead, 400 wounded and 22 captured German and Croatian soldiers; the Chetniks were estimated to have had 23 dead and 5 wounded, while other estimates put the Chetnik casualties at 21 dead and 30 wounded. Predojević, several officers, and an entire Home Guard company were captured by the Chetniks.

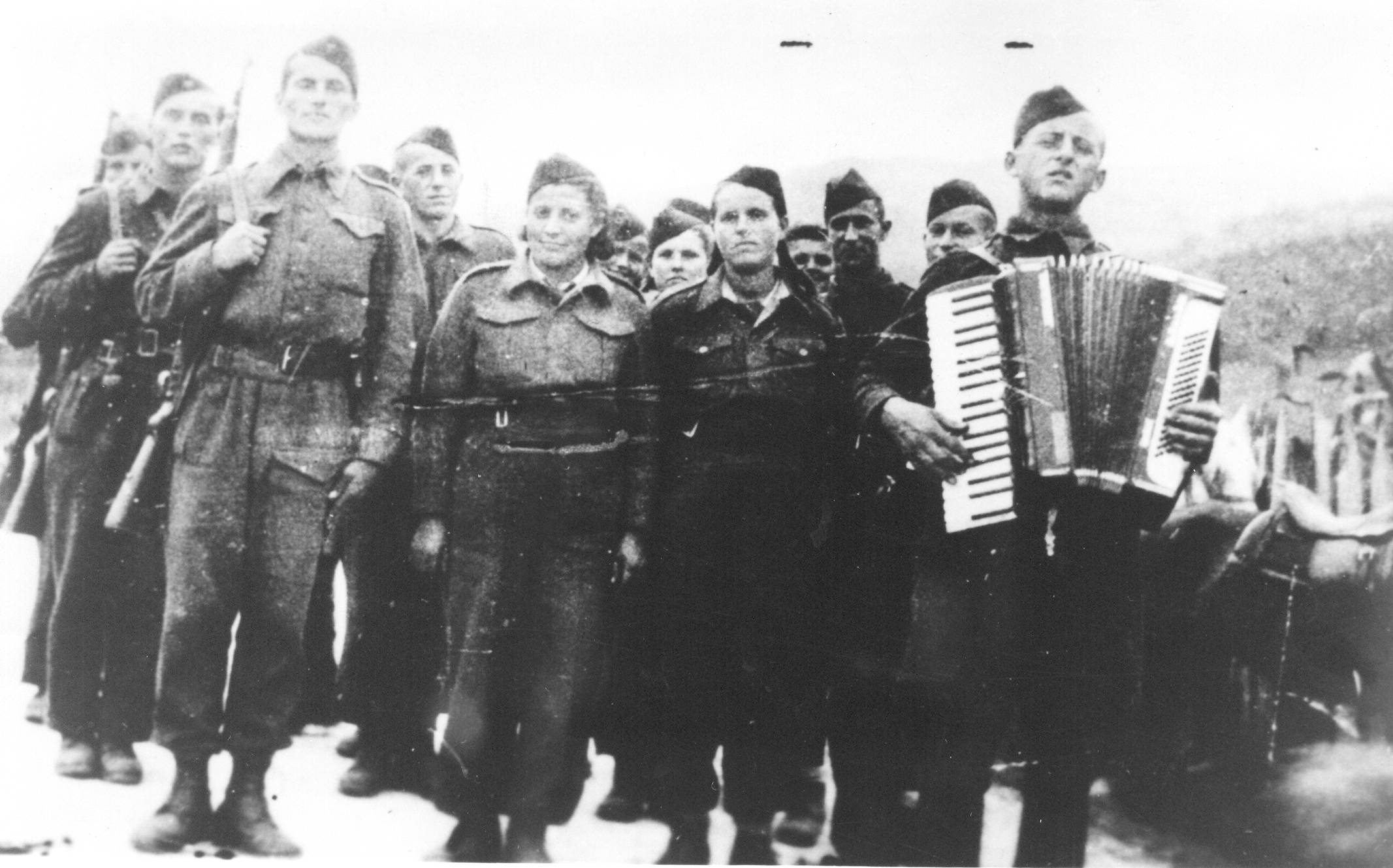
The cultural and artistic team of the Fifth Krajina Division in the vicinity of Dobruna near Višegrad, November 1943.

The Chetniks capture consisted of two field guns, a large quantity of automatic weapons, five hundred rifles, two railway trains, two cars, four motor boats, three rubber boats, seven large and 12 small mortars, one radio station and "incredible quantities of ammunition".

Much of the local Muslim population also fled due to being threatened by the Chetnik advance. The number of Bosnian Muslim civilians who had been slaughtered by Chetniks during the offensive amounted to more than 2,000 in Višegrad.

=== Battle of Rogatica ===
After the fall of Višegrad, Chetnik units continued their advance towards Rogatica, which fell on October 13. About the battles for Rogatica on October 13, the Operations Department informs the Command of the 15th Mountain Corps:

Stronger Chetnik attack with grenade launchers and 105 mm guns on Jabučko sedlo, Mesiće and Rogatica. Rogatica attacked from all sides. The division is moving to the Pale, Mokro, Sokolac line. The third battalion in retreat towards Renovica, Prača. The crew of Rogatica has orders to break through to Sokolac and Mokro.

Given that this attack occurred immediately after the defeat in Tuzla by the partisans, it further worried the German command, but it did not have the resources to actively oppose it. Considering the NOVJ advance from Tuzla towards Doboj, the attack on Travnik and the advance near Prozor, the Germans believed that Sarajevo was in danger, and limited themselves to strengthening the defense.

=== Partisan attack on Chetniks ===
Partisans, who had already expelled Mihailović to Serbia, did not allow him to spread. The Chetnik group appeared in an important strategic position and wedged itself between the 2nd and 3rd NOVJ corps. Therefore, two NOVJ divisions were engaged to remove it. The newly formed 27th NOVJ division, focusing on the area east of Sarajevo, occupied Rogatica on October 22, defeating the Chetniks. On October 26, the Fifth Division captured Višegrad from the Chetniks, which completely destroyed the Chetnik group.

The 27th Partisan division, after defeating the Chetniks in the battles during 27-31 October., liberated Sokolac from Ustaše.

The Partisan forces in Montenegro managed to seize all the cities that the Chetniks liberated from the occupiers and push the Chetniks out of all important positions, while establishing control over considerable Italian forces and resources.

== Consequences ==
The British general ... believes that our units are very badly led and that they do not know military art at all, in contrast to the communists who are very well led. There are many valid observations in this...

– Dragoljub Mihailović in the dispatch dated 16 - XI-43.

Mihailović's attack on Višegrad did not leave a significant impression on either the Germans or the Allies, who still considered Tito the greatest opponent of the Germans in Yugoslavia. On November 1, 1943, the German commander of the Southeast, Maximilian von Weichs, assessed the situation as follows:

The situation in the interior of the Balkan Peninsula, in direct connection with the imagined, that is, the actual course of events in the Mediterranean Sea area, has become significantly more severe... The most dangerous enemy is Tito. (...) Because of this, Mihailović is already looking for a connection with the German command, so as not to fall under communist rule.

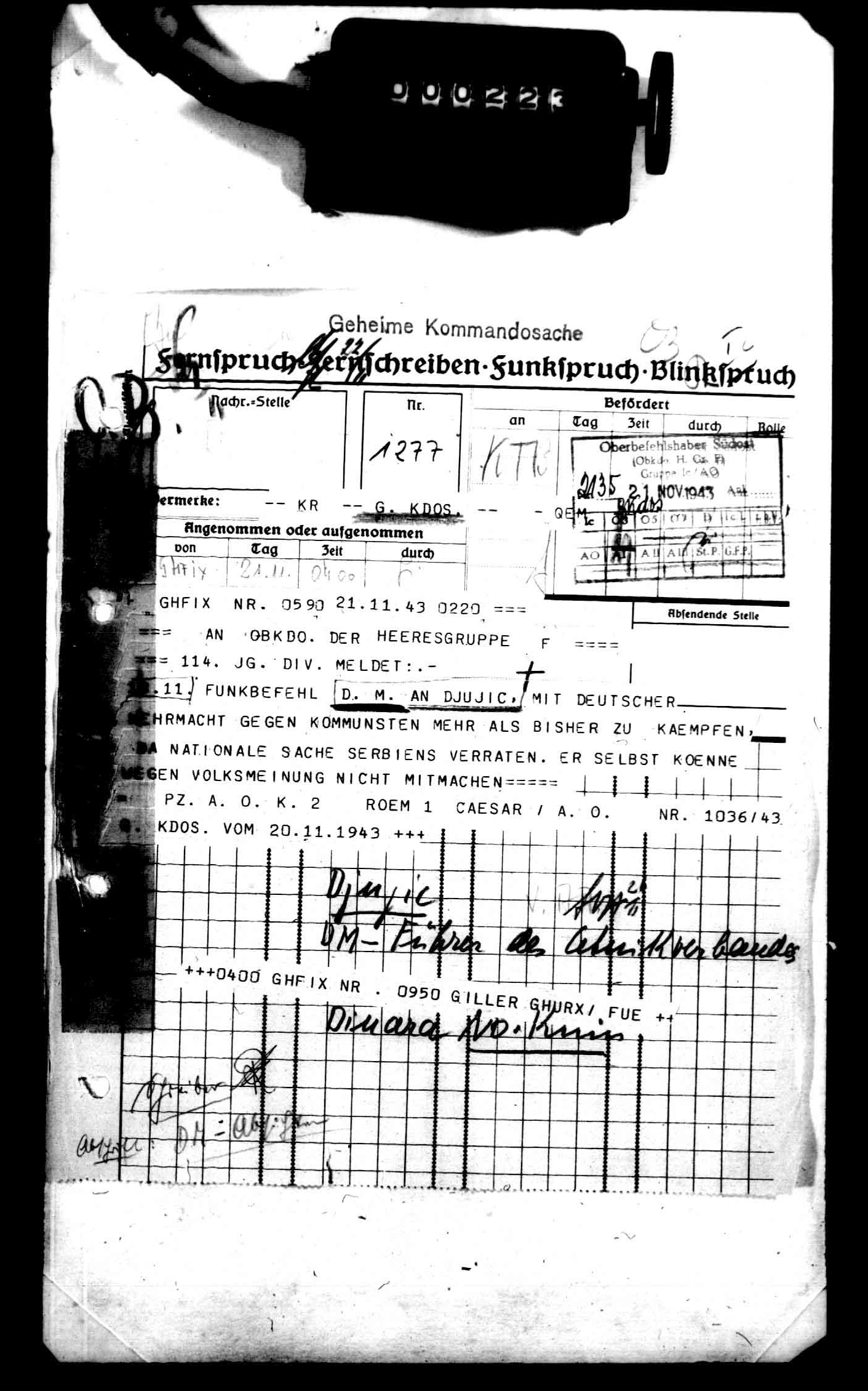
A document issued by Draža Mihailović ordering Đujić to increase cooperation with Wehrmacht and fight the communists

Disappointed by the complete ignoring of this action by the allied leadership, Mihailović suspended similar activities and on November 7 issued a directive on a general attack on the communists. The great majority of his forces outside Serbia had already firmly attached themselves to the Germans, and during November and December 1943, a large part of the forces in Serbia (Lukačević, Kalabić, Jevrem Simić, Ljuba Jovanović) signed agreements with the Germans. The notification of the German commander of the southeast about the agreement concluded with Lukačević reached Churchill quickly, and it was of decisive importance in the decision to leave Mihailović.

Thanks to the breaking of the German radio traffic encryption system, the Allied leaders were well informed about the events in Yugoslavia, and they made the decision to provide as much material and tactical assistance to the Partisans as possible.

Rejected by the Allies, Mihailović immediately entered into negotiations with the new German envoy for the Balkans, Hermann Neubacher.

== Sources ==
- Mencken, Henry Louis (1944). The American Mercury. Mercury Publications.
- Mićanović, Slavko (1971). Istočna Bosna u NOB-u 1941-1945 (in Serbian). Vojnoizdavački zavod.
- Pešić, Miodrag D. (2002). Operation Air Bridge: Serbian Chetniks and the Rescued American Airmen in World War II. Serbian Master's Society. ISBN 978-86-82235-12-5.
- Rootham, Jasper (2004). Bojan B. Dimitrijević (ed.). Pucanj u prazno (in Serbian). Institute of Contemporary History, Belgrade. ISBN 978-86-7403-090-5.
