= Béla Anda =

German communications executive and former government spokesman (born 1963)

Chief of the Federal Press Office & Spokesperson of the Federal Government
- In office 1 October 2002 – 22 November 2005
- Chancellor: Gerhard Schröder
- Deputy: Hans-Hermann Langguth; Thomas Steg
- Preceded by: Uwe-Karsten Heye
- Succeeded by: Ulrich Wilhelm

Personal details
- Born: Béla Nikolai Anda; 4 April 1963 (age 63) Bonn, West Germany
- Party: Social Democratic Party (SPD)
- Spouse: Ina Tenz (m. 2013)
- Children: 4
- Education: Free University of Berlin, London School of Economics
- Profession: Journalist

Béla Nikolai Anda (born 4 April 1963 in Bonn) is a German communications executive and former journalist. During the red–green coalition, he served from 2002 to 2005 as Government Spokesperson and head of the Federal Press Office, in which role he was responsible for, among other things, communicating the Agenda 2010 reforms. He subsequently worked as head of communications at the financial services provider AWD (Swiss Life) and as deputy editor-in-chief of Bild. Since 2016, he has run the consultancy Anda Business Communication GmbH (ABC), which specialises in crisis communication and litigation public relations.

== Early life and education ==
Anda was born the son of László Anda, a Hungarian ecotrophologist with a doctorate, and Renate Anda (née Schulte), an economist and senior teacher. He attended the Ernst-Moritz-Arndt-Gymnasium and the Elly-Heuss-Knapp-Gymnasium in Bonn, where he passed his Abitur in 1982. Before that, in 1979/80, he had spent a year as an American Field Service exchange student at a high school in Sheboygan Falls, Wisconsin, where he earned a high school diploma. From 1982 to 1984, he served as a temporary-career soldier in the Bundeswehr at the Theodor-Körner barracks in Lüneburg, where he trained as a reserve officer, finishing with the rank of Leutnant of the reserve.

== Career ==
=== Journalism (1984–1999) ===
Even before going to university, Anda began a traineeship (Volontariat) at Welt am Sonntag in 1984, then worked in its politics section from April to September 1986. Editor-in-chief Claus Jacobi made him what was then the youngest head of politics at any German newspaper. In autumn 1986 he left the paper to go to university. From 1986 to 1991, Anda studied political science at the Otto Suhr Institute of the Free University of Berlin; in 1989/90 he spent a year at the London School of Economics (LSE) on an Erasmus scholarship. During his studies he continued to work as a journalist, including as a correspondent in London and as a freelancer for the Berliner Morgenpost, the B.Z. and Medium Magazin. He graduated in 1991 with a diploma in political science. Claus Larass, editor-in-chief of the B.Z., then brought Anda onto his staff.

When Larass became editor-in-chief of Bild in 1992, Anda followed him to Hamburg, where he worked at Bild first as an editor, from 1994 as chief reporter and from 1997 as head of the features ("Serie") section. From 1993 onwards, as the paper's "Schröder reporter", he covered Gerhard Schröder, then Minister-President of Lower Saxony and later the SPD's candidate for chancellor. In 1996, Anda and Rolf Kleine published a biography of Schröder, which went through several editions. In late summer 1998, Schröder asked Anda whether he would be willing to work for the government should he win the election.

=== Government spokesperson (1999–2005) ===
In February 1999, Anda became deputy government spokesperson under Uwe-Karsten Heye, alongside the journalist Charima Reinhardt, and was soon regarded as a confidant of Schröder. In 2002 he joined the SPD. After the 2002 German federal election, which secured Schröder's re-election, Anda was appointed in September 2002 to succeed Heye as government spokesperson and head of the Federal Press Office. In this capacity, holding the rank of permanent state secretary, Anda was responsible among other things for communicating the Agenda 2010 and set up a newsroom at the Federal Press Office to respond more quickly to current events. Ahead of the federal elections of 2002 and 2005, he prepared Schröder for the televised debates with Edmund Stoiber and Angela Merkel. The 2002 chancellor debates between Schröder and Stoiber, which Anda prepared in large part together with Ulrich Wilhelm (on the side of the CDU/CSU), attracted considerable attention as the first televised debates in the history of the Federal Republic, each watched by more than 15 million viewers. According to Forsa and Infratest dimap, Schröder won both debates. Anda's term also saw the federal government's refusal to take part in the Iraq War. In 2005, Anda was made a Knight of the Legion of Honour for his contribution to Franco-German relations.

Following the 2005 German federal election and Angela Merkel's election as chancellor, Anda handed the Federal Press Office over to his successor, Ulrich Wilhelm, in November 2005 and, as a civil servant, was placed in temporary retirement. From February 2006 he taught courses at the German Institute for Public Affairs in Berlin.

=== AWD/Swiss Life (2006–2012) ===
In April 2006, Anda joined the AWD Group in Hanover, then listed on the MDAX, as chief communications officer. He was responsible for press relations, marketing and sponsorship, and later also for investor relations. AWD's sponsorship activities included the naming rights to the AWD-Arena in Hanover (now the Heinz von Heiden Arena) and partnerships with Hannover 96, the German Football Association (DFB) and the German Olympic Sports Confederation (DOSB). Anda also oversaw the redesign of AWD's brand identity. After AWD was taken over by the insurance group Swiss Life, he left the company in March 2012. Alongside his work at AWD, Anda wrote the column Andas Ansichten ("Anda's Views", 2007–2008) for the political magazine Cicero.

=== Deputy editor-in-chief of Bild (2012–2015) ===
On 1 August 2012, Anda returned to Bild as a member of the editorial board, deputy editor-in-chief and head of the politics and business section. At the time, the Süddeutsche Zeitung described him as "a man with many contacts – in business and in politics". Together with editor-in-chief Kai Diekmann, he was tasked with preparing Bild for the digital age. Anda merged the print, online and social media teams for politics and business and launched a politics newsletter. When Axel Springer announced in November 2015 that Diekmann would hand over the editorship to Tanit Koch, Anda left the paper. He later said that he could have imagined taking over as editor-in-chief himself, and that after the decision in favour of Koch he had left on good terms.

=== Communications consultant and agency founder (since 2016) ===
In 2016, Anda founded a PR agency with two partners, which by early 2017 he was running as sole managing partner. The agency, Anda Business Communication (ABC), is based at Gut Möschenfeld near Munich and has offices in Berlin and Hanover. Its services include litigation PR (i.e. public relations accompanying legal proceedings), crisis communication, public affairs, podcast production, and advising individuals and companies seeking to change their public image. Anda's wife, the radio executive Ina Tenz, joined the agency in 2019 and, as managing director, heads its podcast and audio division.

One of the agency's first clients was the Rhineland-Palatinate state government under then Minister-President Malu Dreyer: from September 2016, Anda advised it on its communications following the failed sale of Frankfurt–Hahn Airport. From 2016, Anda also coordinated the public relations of Carsten Maschmeyer, who after selling AWD repositioned himself as an investor and as a judge on the VOX show Die Höhle der Löwen; Anda regularly attends the show's recordings. Other clients of Anda's agency have included the meat processing company Tönnies Group and the tennis player Alexander Zverev, for whom Anda worked as a crisis adviser from late 2020. In 2019, Anda was elected to the supervisory board of the hotel group Dormero. From May 2020, Anda hosted the weekly podcast Die Agenda with Gerhard Schröder, which he discontinued with immediate effect after the Russian invasion of Ukraine in 2022. Other audio productions by Anda's agency include Boris Becker – Der fünfte Satz with Boris Becker and Johannes B. Kerner for Amazon Music (2020) and the family and company history Tönnies & Tönnies (2021) with Clemens Tönnies and his son Maximilian. The agency also focuses on producing podcasts about equestrian sport and equine medicine, for example for the Celle State Stud and the Society for Equine Medicine (Gesellschaft für Pferdemedizin). In 2023, Anda's agency devised the public comeback of former racing cyclist Jan Ullrich, with the documentary Jan Ullrich – Der Gejagte on Amazon Prime Video and selected interviews. This was followed in 2024 by Ullrich's autobiography Himmel, Hölle – und zurück ins Leben ("Heaven, Hell – and Back to Life"), in whose publication Anda's agency was also involved. In the criminal trial before the Bonn Regional Court against the lawyer Kai-Uwe Steck, one of the central figures in the cum-ex tax scandal, Anda acted from 2024 as Steck's communications adviser and handled his litigation PR; Steck was defended by Gerhard Strate. In autumn 2025, Anda took on the communications for the businesswoman Christina Block, who had been indicted before the Hamburg Regional Court in April 2025.

== Personal life ==
Anda is the father of four sons. Since 2013, he has been married, in his second marriage, to Ina Tenz, former programme director of Radio ffn and Antenne Bayern.

== Awards ==
- 2004: "PR Professional of the Year", in part for the communication of Agenda 2010
- 2005: Knight of the Legion of Honour for his contribution to Franco-German relations

== Selected works ==
- Gerhard Schröder. Eine Biographie (with Rolf Kleine). Ullstein, Berlin 1996, ISBN 978-3-550-07092-1.
  - Expanded and updated edition. Ullstein, Berlin 1998, ISBN 978-3-548-33231-4.
  - Expanded and updated new edition (with an assessment of the government's record by Martin E. Süskind). Ullstein, Munich 2002, ISBN 3-548-36387-3.
- Andas Ansichten. Column in Cicero, 2007–2008, ISSN 1613-4826.
- "Möglichkeiten und Grenzen der Politikbeeinflussung". In: Axel Sell, Alexander Krylov (eds.): Government Relations. Interaktionen zwischen Wirtschaft, Politik und Gesellschaft. Lang, Bern 2009, ISBN 978-3-631-58487-3, pp. 273–277.
- "AWD: Local Branding als Ansatz für Marketingkommunikation zur Kundenakquise und Kundenbindung" (with Andreas Fischer). In: Sven Reinecke (ed.): Best Practice in Marketing. Compendio, Zurich 2010, ISBN 978-3-7155-9469-9, pp. 12–22.
- "Die Marke als Kapital: Mittel zur Wertsteigerung". In: Béla Anda, Stefan Endrös, Jochen Kalka (eds.): WertZeichen setzen! Wege in die Kommunikationszukunft in Marketing, Medien und PR. mi, Munich 2010, ISBN 978-3-86880-025-8, pp. 78–80.
- "Unternehmenskommunikation als aktive Management-Aufgabe: Presse- und PR-Abteilungen müssen fusionieren". In: Béla Anda, Stefan Endrös, Jochen Kalka, Sascha Lobo (eds.): SignsBook – Zeichen setzen in der Kommunikation. Springer Gabler, Wiesbaden 2012, ISBN 978-3-8349-4008-7, pp. 109–112.
- Numerous journalistic articles in Welt am Sonntag, Die Welt, Bild, B.Z. and other newspapers and magazines.

=== As editor ===
- WertZeichen setzen! Wege in die Kommunikationszukunft in Marketing, Medien und PR (with Stefan Endrös, Jochen Kalka). mi, Munich 2010, ISBN 978-3-86880-025-8.
- SignsBook – Zeichen setzen in der Kommunikation (with Stefan Endrös, Jochen Kalka, Sascha Lobo). Springer Gabler, Wiesbaden 2012, ISBN 978-3-8349-4008-7.
