= Ulrich Wilhelm =

German lawyer and journalist

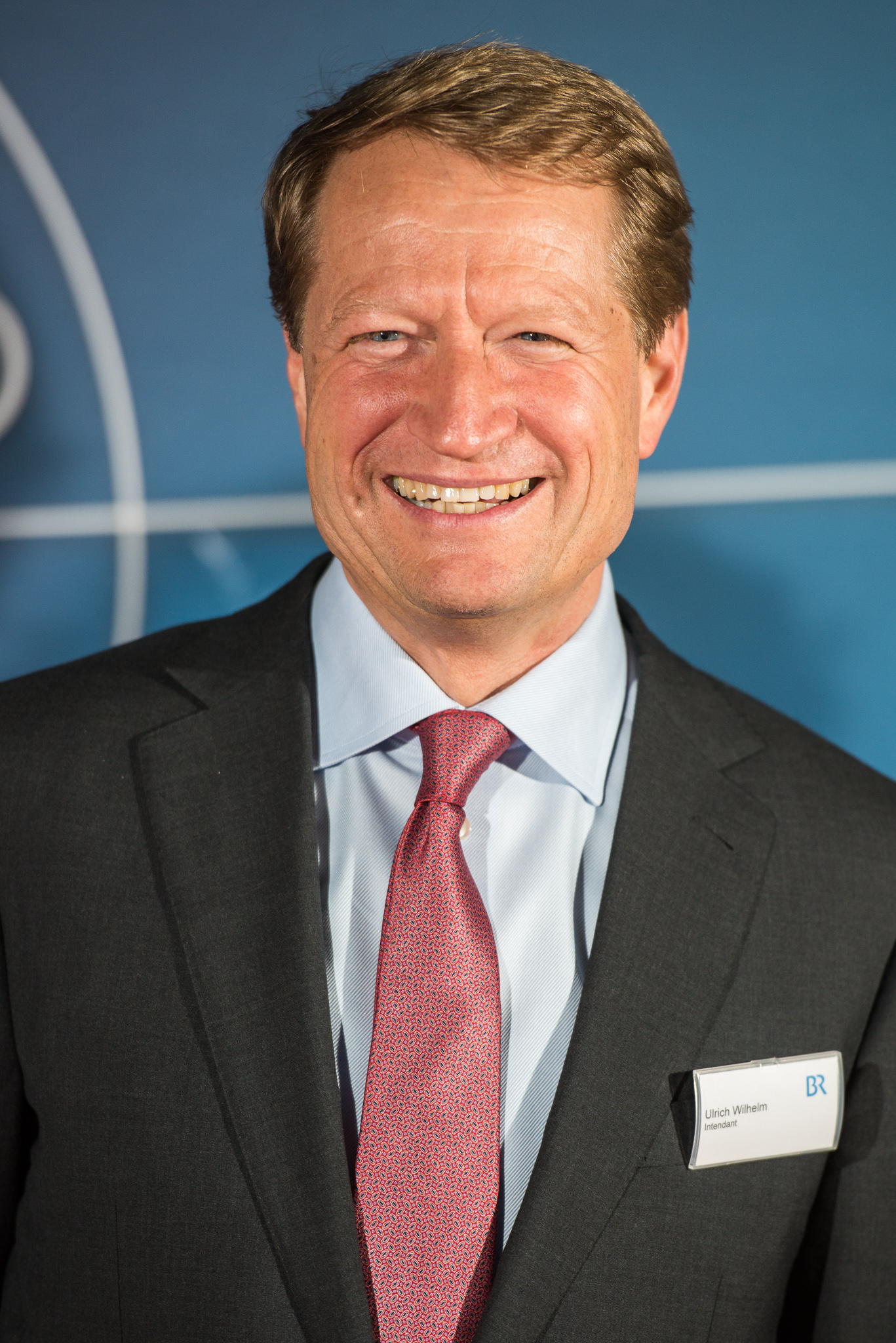

Speaker of Government
- In office 2005–2010
- Chancellor: Angela Merkel
- Preceded by: Béla Anda
- Succeeded by: Steffen Seibert

Personal details
- Born: 8 July 1961 (age 65) Munich, West Germany
- Profession: Lawyer

Ulrich Wilhelm (born 8 July 1961 in Munich) is a German lawyer and journalist who has been serving as director of the Bayerischer Rundfunk (BR) since 2011.

== Career ==
On 19 March 2015, the Rundfunkrat des Bayerischen Rundfunks chose him for a second term by 31 January 2021. From 2005 to 2010, William was Chief of the Federal Press Office and Government Spokesman of State (Regierungssprecher) for the Cabinet of Germany (the First Merkel cabinet as well the Second Merkel cabinet).

Wilhelm took over the rotating chairmanship of the ARD in 2018 for two years. In 2020, he announced that he would not extend his contract with BR beyond 2021.

== Other activities ==
- acatech, Member of the Board of Trustees
- American Academy in Berlin, Member of the Board of Trustees
- BMW Foundation, Member of the Board of Trustees
- Civis media prize, Ex-Officio Member of the Board of Trustees
- Deutsche Post Stiftung, Member of the Scientific Council
- Fazit-Stiftung, Chair of the Board of Trustees
- Frank Schirrmacher Foundation, Member of the Advisory Board
- Institute of Bavarian History, LMU Munich, Member of the Board of Trustees
- Kissinger Sommer, Member of the Board of Trustees
- Lindau Nobel Laureate Meetings, Member of the Honorary Senate
- Petersburger Dialog, Member
- Roland Berger Foundation, Member of the Board of Trustees
- Senckenberg Nature Research Society, Member of the Board of Trustees
- Technical University of Munich (TUM), Member of the Board of Trustees
- University of Erlangen-Nuremberg (FAU), Member of the Board of Trustees

== Recognition ==
Wilhelm was appointed in 2007 as a commander with a star of the Royal Norwegian Confederation.
