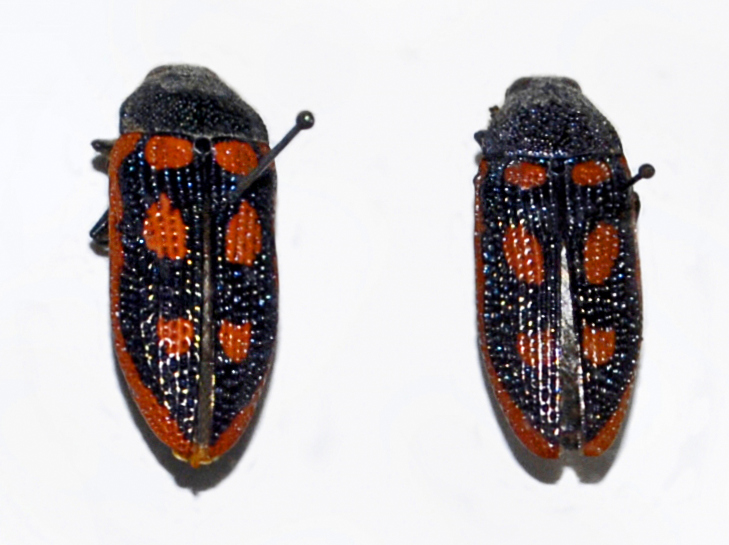
- Stigmodera cancellata. Mounted specimen.

Scientific classification
- Kingdom: Animalia
- Phylum: Arthropoda
- Class: Insecta
- Order: Coleoptera
- Suborder: Polyphaga
- Infraorder: Elateriformia
- Family: Buprestidae
- Genus: Stigmodera
- Species: S. cancellata

Binomial name
- Stigmodera cancellata (Donovan, 1805)

Synonyms
- Buprestis dejeaniana Boisduval, 1835; Buprestis cancellata Donovan, 1805

= Stigmodera cancellata =

Species of beetle

Stigmodera cancellata, common name Red Spotted Jewel Beetle, is a species of beetles in the family Buprestidae.

== Description ==
Stigmodera cancellata can reach a length of about 33 millimetres (1.3 in). Elytra are dark greenish with six red spots and red edges, while pronotum is blackish.

Larvae live underground for up to 15 years.

== Distribution ==
This species can be found in the western Australia.
