= Zaharije Ostojić =

Montenegrin Chetnik leader

Lieutenant Colonel Zaharije Ostojić
- Захарије Остојић
- Ostojić during World War II
- Born: 1907; Gluhi Do, near Bar; Principality of Montenegro
- Died: c. April – May 1945 (aged 37/38); Jasenovac concentration camp, Jasenovac, Independent State of Croatia
- Military career
- Allegiance: Yugoslavia (−1941); Chetniks (1941–1945)
- Service years: –1945
- Rank: Lieutenant Colonel
- Nicknames: Branko; Zare
- Commands: Chief of staff to Supreme Chetnik Command; Chetnik detachments in Herzegovina
- Conflicts: World War II in Yugoslavia: 1942 Montenegro offensive; Operation Weiss; Battle of Višegrad; Battle of Lijevče Field

Lieutenant Colonel Zaharije Ostojić (Serbian Cyrillic: Захарије Остојић; 1907 – April 1945) was a Montenegrin Serb and Yugoslav military officer who served as the chief of the operational, organisational and intelligence branches of the Chetnik Supreme Command led by Draža Mihailović in Yugoslavia during World War II. He was a major in the Royal Yugoslav Army Air Force prior to the Axis invasion of Yugoslavia, and was involved in the coup that deposed Prince Paul of Yugoslavia on 27 March 1941. After the coup, he escorted Prince Paul to exile in Greece, and was in Cairo during the invasion in April. In September 1941, he was landed on the coast of the Italian governorate of Montenegro along with the British Special Operations Executive officer Captain Bill Hudson and two companions. He escorted Hudson to the German-occupied territory of Serbia and introduced him to the Yugoslav Partisan leader Josip Broz Tito at Užice, then accompanied Hudson to Ravna Gora to meet Mihailović. Ostojić soon became Mihailović's chief of staff, and after the German attempt to capture the Chetnik leader during Operation Mihailovic in December 1941, brought the Chetnik Supreme Command staff to Montenegro where they were re-united with Mihailović in June 1942. During the remainder of 1942, Ostojić launched a counter-attack against Ustaše troops of the Independent State of Croatia returning to the eastern Bosnian town of Foča where they were expected to continue their genocidal anti-Serb policies. As many as 2,000 local Muslims were subsequently killed in the town by forces under Ostojić's command. Ostojić later oversaw large-scale massacres of civilians and burning of Muslim villages in the border region between Montenegro and the Sandžak.

While the Chetniks were an anti-Axis movement in their long-range goals and did engage in marginal resistance activities for limited periods, they also carried out for almost all of the war a tactical or selective collaboration with the occupation authorities against the Partisans. This was demonstrated in late 1942 and early 1943, when Ostojić planned and oversaw the Chetnik involvement in the large Axis anti-Partisan offensive Operation Weiss alongside Italian troops. In 1944, he became a leader of the Chetnik forces in Herzegovina, and along with Dobroslav Jevđević was involved in attempts to come to terms with the Allied forces. In late 1944, as the Partisans tightened their grip on the country and the Soviet Red Army assisted in the capture of Belgrade, he rejoined Mihailović in northeastern Bosnia but they could not agree on what course of action to take, continue fighting the Partisans or attempt to flee Yugoslavia. Ostojić, along with Chetnik leaders Pavle Đurišić and Petar Baćović and Chetnik ideologue Dragiša Vasić decided to move west to the area of the Ljubljana Gap in modern-day Slovenia where other collaborationist forces were concentrating. In early April 1945, faced with attacks by the Partisans and the Armed Forces of the Independent State of Croatia (Croatian: Hrvatske oružane snage, HOS) along their route, the combined Chetnik force was defeated by HOS forces in the Battle of Lijevče Field, after which Ostojić was captured by the Ustaše in an apparent trap. He was killed alongside Đurišić, Baćović and Vasić.

== Early life ==
Zaharije Ostojić was a Montenegrin Serb, and was born in 1907 in the village of Gluhi Do in the Crmnica District, near the Adriatic seaport of Bar in the Principality of Montenegro. In 1910, the principality became the Kingdom of Montenegro, and after World War I, it became part of the Kingdom of Serbs, Croats and Slovenes, and in 1929, the Kingdom of Yugoslavia. After completing his schooling, Ostojić joined the Royal Yugoslav Air Force (Serbo-Croatian Latin: Jugoslovensko kraljevsko ratno vazduhoplovstvo, JKRV) and prior to the outbreak of World War II had risen to the rank of major. Little else has been recorded of Ostojić's early life, but his sister was married to Royal Yugoslav Army Brigadni đeneral (Note: Equivalent to a U.S. Army brigadier general.) Ljubo Novaković, another Montenegrin Serb who, like Ostojić, later became a Chetnik commander during World War II.

== To Cairo and back ==
After the outbreak of World War II in September 1939, the government of Regent Prince Paul of Yugoslavia declared its neutrality. Despite this, and with the aim of securing his southern flank for the pending invasion of the Soviet Union, Adolf Hitler began placing heavy pressure on Yugoslavia to sign the Tripartite Pact and join the Axis. After some delay, the Yugoslav government conditionally signed the Pact on 25 March 1941. Two days later a putatively anti-Axis bloodless coup d'état deposed Prince Paul and declared 17-year-old Prince Peter II of Yugoslavia of age. Ostojić had a close relationship with one of the main instigators of the coup, the deputy commander of the JKRV, Brigadni đeneral Borivoje Mirković, and was personally involved in the coup. Ostojić escorted Prince Paul to exile in Greece and then travelled on to Cairo.

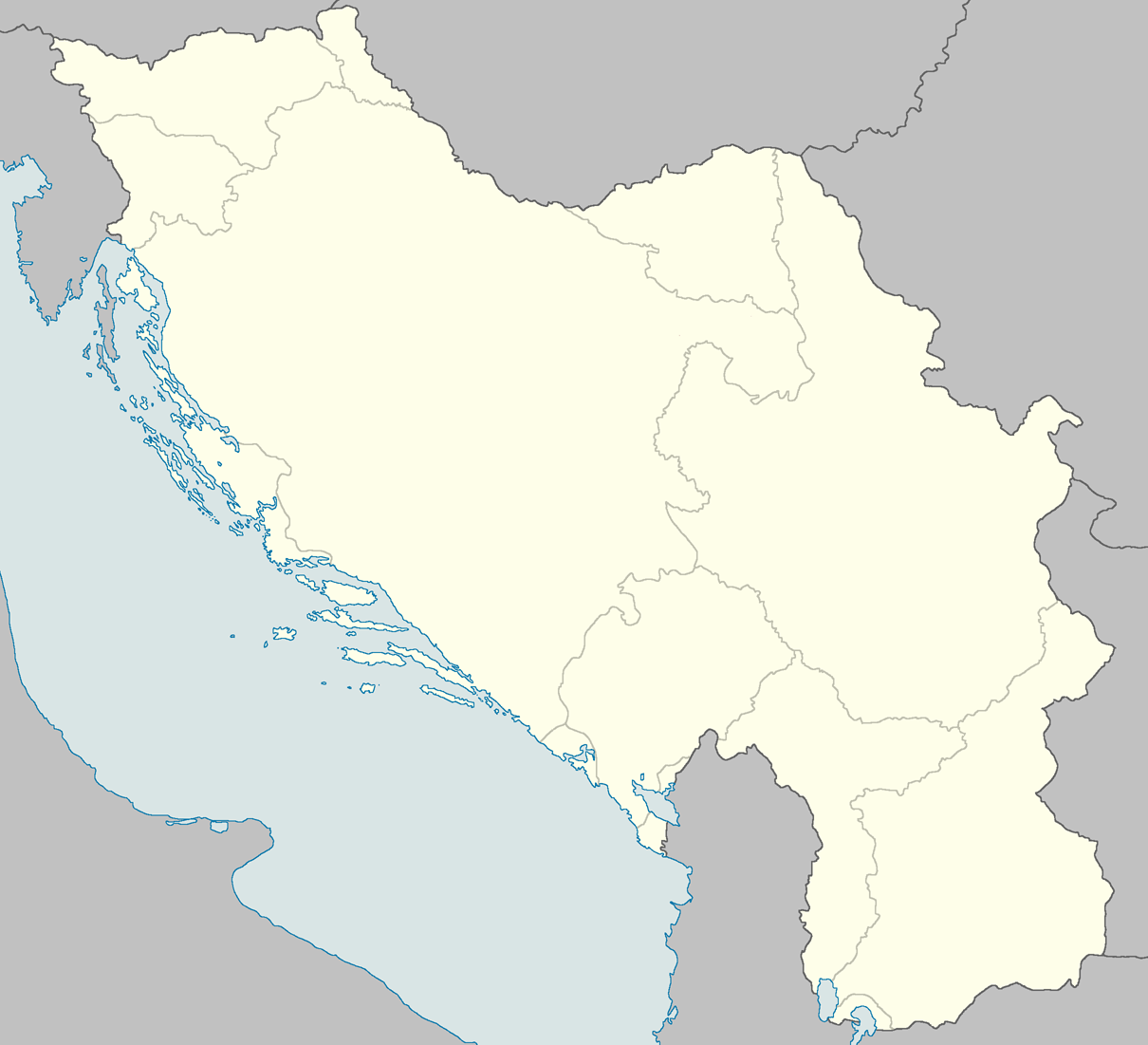
Map of occupied Yugoslavia showing Ostojić's landing point in Montenegro and the headquarters of the Partisans (green) and the Chetniks (red)

Following the subsequent German-led invasion of Yugoslavia and the Yugoslav capitulation 11 days later, Ostojić remained in Cairo until he was selected to join a combined British–Yugoslav Special Operations Executive team which was to infiltrate into occupied Yugoslavia and make contact with resistance groups. The other members of the team were: Captain Bill Hudson; a fellow JKRV officer, Major Mirko Lalatović; and a radio operator. They flew from Cairo to Malta on 13 September 1941, before being landed from the British submarine HMS Triumph on the coast of the Italian governorate of Montenegro near Petrovac between 20 and 22 September 1941. They quickly came into contact with the communist-led Montenegrin Partisans, including Milovan Đilas and Arso Jovanović, who escorted Hudson and Ostojić to Partisan-held Užice in the German-occupied territory of Serbia. While Hudson familiarised himself with the Partisans, Ostojić went on to visit the Chetnik leader Pukovnik (Note: Equivalent to a U.S. Army colonel.) Draža Mihailović's headquarters at Ravna Gora. After briefing Mihailović, Ostojić went back to escort Hudson to Ravna Gora, arriving there on 25 October. When he first arrived at Ravna Gora, Ostojić had delivered a message to Mihailović from the War Minister of the Yugoslav government-in-exile, Armijski đeneral (Note: Equivalent to a U.S. Army lieutenant general.) Bogoljub Ilić, assuring him of the official support of the government-in-exile, but stating that "a rebellion would not be tolerated". Ostojić also told Mihailović that the communists had taken control of Montenegro. Ostojić and Lalatović then assumed senior staff positions in Mihailović's supreme command headquarters.

From the very beginning the Chetnik strategy was to organise and build up their strength, but postpone armed operations against the occupation forces until they were withdrawing in the face of a hoped-for landing by the Western Allies in Yugoslavia. The Chetniks did half-heartedly join the initially successful Partisan-initiated uprising in Serbia after it started in July 1941, but almost as soon as they did, it became apparent that the aims of the two movements were too different for any real cooperation. Once Mihailović realised that the goal of the Partisans was to recreate Yugoslavia along multi-ethnic and communist lines, which was directly opposed to the Chetniks main objective of creating a "Greater Serbia", with a planned return to the monarchy and Serbian hegemony, they determined that the Partisans were their main enemy, and were willing to ally themselves with anyone that would help them defeat the Partisans, including the occupying powers and those that collaborated with them, such as the fascist Ustaše in the Axis puppet state, the Independent State of Croatia (Serbo-Croatian Latin: Nezavisna Država Hrvatska, NDH). On 1 November the Chetniks unsuccessfully attacked the Partisan headquarters at Užice, and from then on, the hostility between the two movements gradually spread from the occupied territory of Serbia to the rest of Yugoslavia.

== Move to Montenegro ==
After the successful German counter-insurgency operations Uzice and Mihailovic, and the split with the Partisans, Mihailović went on the run in early December 1941. Ostojić maintained a small headquarters consisting mainly of the intelligence staff, which remained close to Mihailović and his small personal staff as he moved around the Rudnik Mountain area during the rest of the winter, ending in February 1942. Mihailović eventually made his way to Montenegro, where he arrived in June 1942. Ostojić, Hudson and other officers joined him soon after, travelling through Italian-held towns by truck disguised as troops of the Nedić regime, a puppet government in the German-occupied territory of Serbia. By this time, the Chetnik movement had determined not to fight the Germans, and had commenced collaborating with the Nedić regime soon after they attacked the Partisans at Užice. By the time Mihailović reached Montenegro, an increasing proportion of Chetnik detachments throughout Yugoslavia were also collaborating with the Italians in Montenegro and the areas of the NDH they occupied.

In a directive letter dated 30 July 1942, Ostojić urged all Chetnik commanders to "develop the strongest possible oral and written propaganda". He stated that, "the people must be persuaded that the Chetniks are their only friends and that it is from them that they can expect freedom and a happy life" and instructed the Chetniks to "work day and night and maintain the spirit of the people". He wrote, "the hour of freedom is near. Allied aid for the Chetniks is assured, and the whole world is admiring them." In August, he launched a counter-attack against Ustaše troops returning to Foča as the Italians withdrew their garrisons from the hinterland. The Chetniks feared the Ustaše were about to unleash another round of genocidal violence on the Serb population in the area. After they occupied the town, at least 2,000 local Muslims were killed in Foča by forces under Ostojić's command. The Chetnik commander in eastern Bosnia and Herzegovina, Petar Baćović, reported the massacre to Mihailović. The historian Marko Attila Hoare states this massacre was part of a "systematic effort to exterminate or expel the Muslim and Croat population" from parts of Yugoslavia that were to form part of Greater Serbia. The historian Jozo Tomasevich agrees, observing that expulsion of the non-Serb population from this and other areas was done in pursuit of the principal Chetnik ideology of achieving an ethnically homogenous Greater Serbia.

In accordance with the Chetniks' Greater Serbia ideology, in November 1942, Ostojić was encouraged by Mihailović to wage a campaign of terror against the Muslim population living along the borders of Montenegro and the Sandžak, and subsequently reported that Chetniks had destroyed 21 villages and killed about 1,300 people. Between 30 November and 2 December 1942, Ostojić represented Mihailović at the Conference of Young Chetnik Intellectuals of Montenegro at the village of Šahovići near Bijelo Polje in the Sandžak, which was also attended by the Montenegrin Chetnik leader Pavle Đurišić. The conference was dominated by Đurišić and its resolutions "expressed extremism and intolerance", as well as an agenda which was focused on restoring the pre-war status quo in Yugoslavia implemented in its initial stages by a Chetnik dictatorship. It also laid claim to parts of the territory of Yugoslavia's neighbours. During the conference, Ostojić attempted to moderate the influence of the other delegates.

Chetniks of Zaharije Ostojić participated in Chetnik action led by Pavle Đurišić in srezes of Čajniče, Foča, Pljevlja and Priboj in February 1943. against Muslims. On the first day, February 5, of operation at least 31 settlements were partially or fully razed. In a report to Draža Mihailović from February 13, Đurišić claimed that Chetniks killed 1200 fighters and 8000 civilians. While both numbers are somewhat exaggerated, it is undeniable that Chetniks wanted to ethnically cleanse that region. Đurišić and Ostojić had given orders not to harm civilian population prior to operation, however considering that no one was punished for crimes against Muslim civilians, Ostojić's previous remarks about Muslims(to definitely eliminate the Turks) and report to Mihailović, its clear organisations of operation planned to ethnically cleanse the Muslims.

== Operation Weiss ==
A few weeks after the conference, Mihailović sent Ostojić to establish a forward headquarters in Kalinovik in south-eastern Bosnia. Ostojić was to command an operation aimed at encircling and destroying Partisan forces in Bosnia, which was to use Chetnik units serving as Italian auxiliaries in Herzegovina and Montenegro, as well as other Chetnik units in the Lika region, northern Bosnia and northern Dalmatia. The plan was predicated on an Allied landing on the Dalmatian coast, which Mihailović believed was imminent. The outline concept was that the Chetniks would set up a corridor through the Italian-occupied zone of the NDH as far as the Partisan liberated area in western Bosnia and Lika, neutralising the Italians through a combination of vague promises, encouraging them to surrender, and disarming them if necessary. The plan was finalised by early December 1942 at Mihailović's headquarters in Montenegro, and operations were planned to commence on 5 January 1943. However, the plan assumed that Mihailović's forces were unified, which they were not, and also that his authority extended to many more Chetniks than it did in reality.

What transpired instead was that the Chetniks that were preparing for the "march on Bosnia" were drawn into closer collaboration with the Axis during the second phase of Operation Weiss that took place in the Neretva and Rama river valleys in late February 1943. During this offensive, between 12,000 and 15,000 Chetniks fought alongside Italian forces, and in one case alongside German and Croatian troops, against the Partisans. Despite the fact that the Chetniks were an anti-Axis movement in their long-range goals and did engage in marginal resistance activities for limited periods, their involvement in Operation Weiss is one of the most significant examples of their tactical or selective collaboration with the Axis occupation forces. In this instance, the participating Chetniks operated as legalised auxiliary forces under Italian control. Ostojić believed that it was actions such as these that would cost the Chetniks the support of the Allies, and he wrote to Mihailović that the Allies would probably have supported the Chetniks had they been more involved in fighting the occupation. Ostojić told Mihailović that his officers also held this view, and proposed that Chetnik collaboration be reconsidered. However, upon receiving Ostojić's message, Mihailović did not even consider changing his strategy.

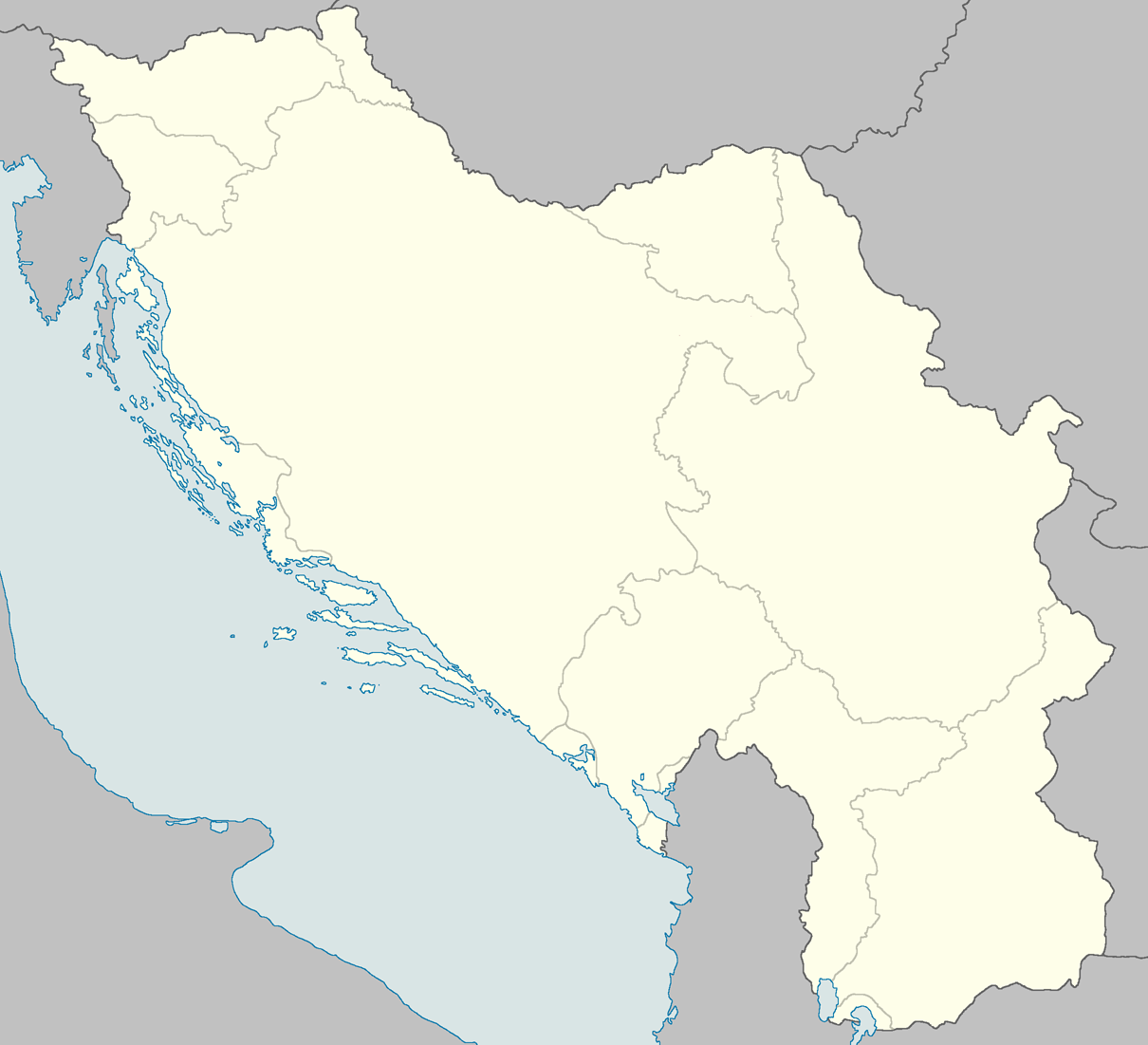
Map of occupied Yugoslavia showing towns relating to the Chetnik involvement in Operation Weiss

Rebuffed, Ostojić drew up a plan in accordance with Mihailović's orders, which called for the Chetniks to remain south and east of the Neretva to avoid being outflanked by the Partisans. However, this essentially defensive strategy was rejected by Herzegovinian Chetnik commanders such as Dobroslav Jevđević and Bajo Stanišić, who wished to follow the Axis-led offensive strategy. This placed Ostojić in a very difficult position, with some of his key detachment commanders following the orders of the Italians rather than his, while the Chetniks were reliant on Italian air and artillery support, particularly around Jablanica. Ostojić subsequently changed his mind and supported the Italian offensive plans, launching an attack aimed at preventing the Partisans from retreating from Jablanica to Prozor on 27 February 1943. The attack was indecisive and Ostojić reprimanded the detachment commanders responsible, particularly Stanišić.

During this phase Ostojić first asked Jevđević to obtain more supplies from the Italians, and then when they refused, threatened to declare war on them. By early March, just as the Partisans were forcing a crossing eastwards across the Neretva at Jablanica, Mihailović joined Ostojić. In a letter to one of his other Montenegrin Chetnik commanders, Mihailović stated that he was managing the whole operation through Ostojić, although Mihailović later denied that he was in charge of the operation when questioned during his trial by a Yugoslav court after the war. Mihailović and Ostojić realised that the large concentrations of Chetnik troops in and around Mostar and the nearby bauxite mines were likely to draw German attention, and while they were focused on this issue, the Partisans completed their crossing of the Neretva by mid-March.

Within two weeks of Mihailović's arrival the Partisans forced the Chetniks to withdraw, losing Nevesinje then Kalinovik to them before the end of March. During the fighting, Chetnik commanders had been ill-disciplined and had failed to cooperate, causing Ostojić to threaten them with courts martial and summary execution. Mihailović ordered Ostojić to pull the Chetniks back towards positions on the line of the Drina–Piva rivers, some 80–90 kilometres (50–56 mi) south-east of Jablanica. By this point the Chetniks had suffered heavy losses, and the Partisans broke through the combined Italian–Chetnik defence line in early April. In a report dated November 1944, long after the British had withdrawn their support from the Chetniks due to their collaboration with and inaction against the occupiers, Colonel Bill Bailey, the senior British liaison officer with the Chetniks at the time of Operation Weiss stated that both Ostojić and Major Vojislav Lukačević had been very critical of Mihailović's "foolhardy, though brave, tactical handling" of Chetnik forces during the operation, which had "contributed largely to the failure of operations". Ostojić himself did not possess the necessary authority with his subordinate commanders, had been unable to cope with the rapidly changing situation, had initially adopted an unpopular and ineffective defensive strategy, and had then blamed the detachment commanders for the Chetnik failures.

== 1943–1944 ==
In July 1943, the Montenegrin Partisan leader Đilas contacted both Ostojić and Baćović to establish their willingness to work jointly against the Axis occupiers, given that a new government-in-exile was about to be established without Mihailović. They reported this contact to Mihailović who threatened to exclude them from his Chetnik organisation if they maintained contact with the Partisans.

In October 1943 Chetnik troops under command of Ostojić took over Višegrad from NDH and German forces, after which Chetniks massacred Muslim and to lesser extent Croat population of the city. This event has been ignored by post-war Yugoslav historiography because it was an example of successful fight of Chetniks against Axis forces, despite the scale of Chetnik crimes in the town and surrounding villages. Ostojić claimed in a report that killing, pillaging and robbery done by his soldiers happened against his orders, however justified it with recent massacre of few tens of Serbs in near-by villages. He purposely ignores much larger scale of massacres in Višegrad and the fact that killing lasted three days and stopped only because of intervention by Albert Seitz, member of American mission to Chetnik High Quarters.

By September 1944, Ostojić had been promoted to potpukovnik (Note: Equivalent to a U.S. Army lieutenant colonel.), and was the Chetnik area commander in eastern Bosnia. In early September 1944, as Mihailović had been removed as Minister of the Army, Navy and Air Force with the demise of the Purić government-in-exile, Ostojić tried to make contact with Allied forces in Italy, and agreed with Lukačević to issue a proclamation to the people explaining that they were going to attack the Germans. After 12 September 1944, when King Peter called for all in Yugoslavia to rally around Tito, Ostojić and Baćović warned Mihailović that their men were losing their will to fight the Partisans. Concerned that the Russians would hand the Chetniks over to the Partisans, Ostojić then contacted the United States Office of Strategic Services liaison officer with the Chetniks, Colonel Robert H. McDowell, but was unable to arrange for the Chetniks to be placed under American command.

== Retreat and death ==
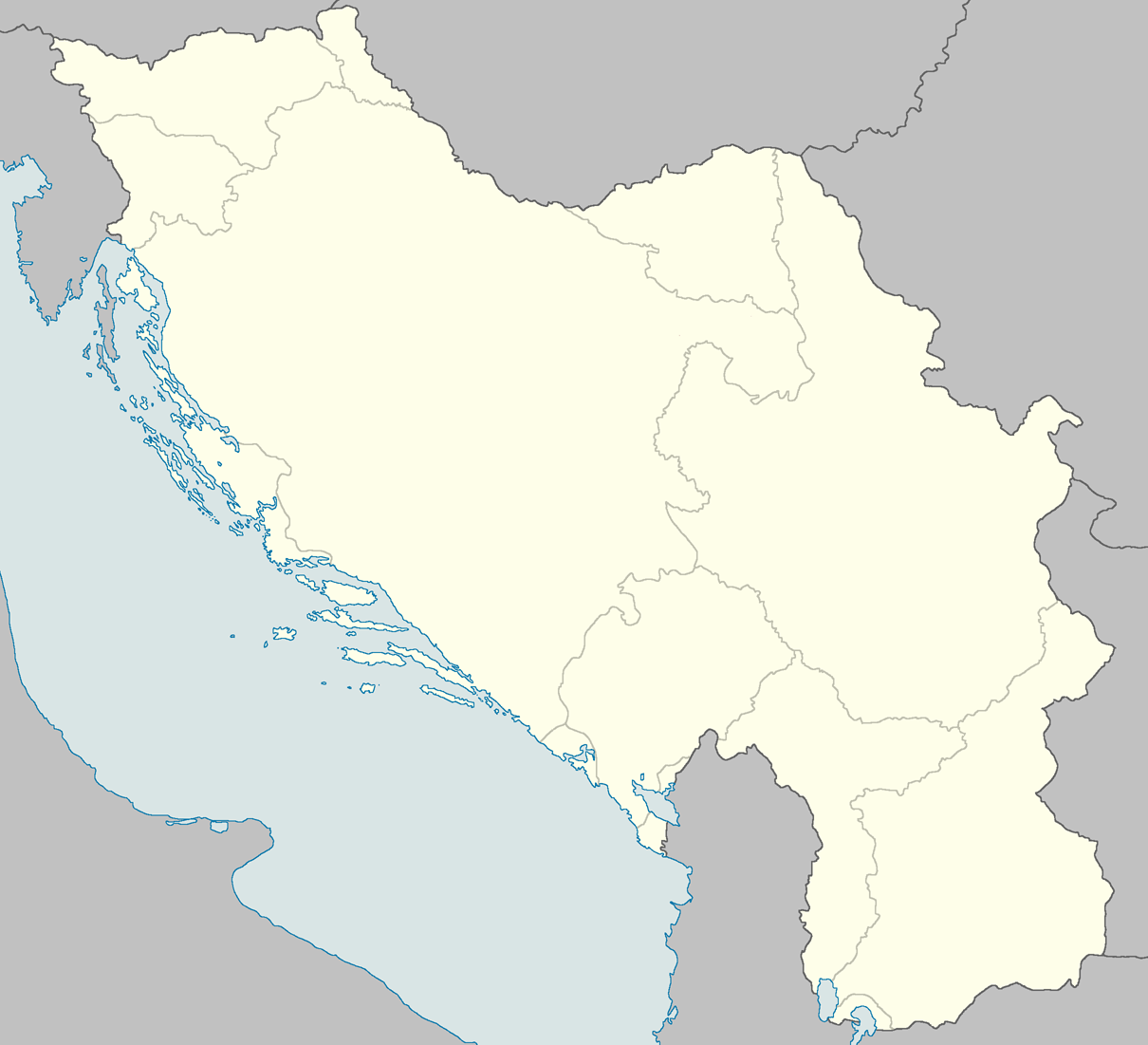
Map of occupied Yugoslavia showing places relating to Ostojić' westward retreat with Đurišić

After the fall of Belgrade to combined Soviet Red Army and Partisan forces on 20 October 1944, Mihailović and a force of a few hundred of his Chetniks withdrew from Serbian territory, crossed the Drina and based themselves in the Majevica mountain area north of Tuzla in north-eastern Bosnia. Ostojić, who was commanding Herzegovinian Chetniks, was joined by Đurišić and his Montenegrin Chetniks and together they withdrew towards Mihailović.

From the time he joined Mihailović in northeastern Bosnia, Đurišić was very critical of Mihailović's leadership, and argued strongly for all the remaining Chetnik troops to move to the area of the Ljubljana Gap in modern-day Slovenia. At this point Ostojić and Baćović were also questioning Mihailović's plans. When Mihailović remained unconvinced, Đurišić decided to move to the Ljubljana Gap independent of Mihailović, and arranged for Dimitrije Ljotić's forces already in the Ljubljana Gap to meet him near Bihać in western Bosnia to assist his movement. When he left Mihailović, he was joined by Chetnik ideologue Dragiša Vasić and the Chetnik detachments commanded by Ostojić and Baćović as well as a large number of refugees.

In order to get to Bihać, Đurišić made a safe-conduct agreement with elements of the Armed Forces of the Independent State of Croatia (Croatian: Hrvatske oružane snage, HOS) and with the Montenegrin separatist Sekula Drljević. The details of the agreement are not known, but it appears Đurišić, Ostojić and Baćović and their troops were meant to cross the Sava River into Slavonia where they would be aligned with Drljević as the Montenegrin National Army with Đurišić retaining operational command. The Chetniks however, appear to have tried to outsmart the HOS forces and Drljević by sending their sick and wounded across the river, but retaining their fit troops south of the river, after which they began moving them westwards. Harassed by both the HOS troops and Partisans, they reached the Vrbas River, which they began to cross. In the Battle of Lijevče Field, north of Banja Luka, which was fought between 30 March and 8 April 1945, the combined Chetnik force was badly beaten by a strong HOS force which possessed German-supplied tanks.

Following this defeat and the defection of one of their sub-units to Drljević, Đurišić was induced to negotiate directly with the leaders of the HOS forces about the further movement of the Chetniks towards the Ljubljana Gap. However, this appears to have been a trap, as he was attacked and captured by them on his way to the meeting. According to Tomasevich, exactly what occurred after his capture is not clear, but Baćović, Đurišić, Vasić, and Ostojić were subsequently killed, along with some Serbian Orthodox priests and others. The location of Ostojić's grave, if any, is unknown. Both the NDH forces and Drljević had reasons for ensnaring Đurišić and those accompanying him. The NDH forces were motivated by the mass terror committed by Đurišić, Ostojić and others on the Muslim population in Sandžak and south-eastern Bosnia, while Drljević was opposed to Đurišić's support of a union of Serbia and Montenegro which ran counter to Drljević's separatism.
