= Pribinovići =

Pribinovići Прибиновићи
- Former village
- Location within Bosnia and Herzegovina
- Country: Bosnia and Herzegovina
- Entity: Federation of Bosnia and Herzegovina
- Canton: West Herzegovina
- Municipality: Široki Brijeg
- Time zone: UTC+1 (CET)
  - Summer (DST): UTC+2 (CEST)

Pribinovići (Serbian: Прибиновићи) was a village in Bosnia and Herzegovina. According to the 1991 census, the village was located in the municipality of Široki Brijeg.

Within the municipality of Široki Brijeg, a new settlement Mokro was created by merging the settlements Duboko Mokro and Pribinovići.

== Demographics ==
According to the 2013 census, the population of Mokro was 1,411.
