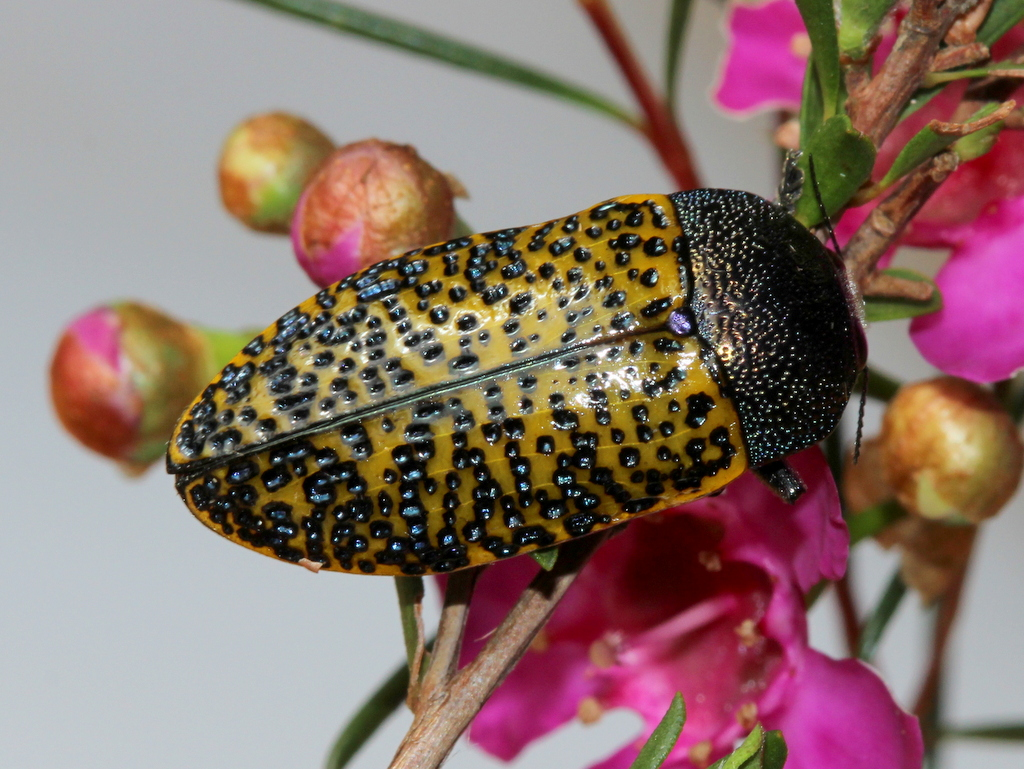

Scientific classification
- Kingdom: Animalia
- Phylum: Arthropoda
- Class: Insecta
- Order: Coleoptera
- Suborder: Polyphaga
- Infraorder: Elateriformia
- Family: Buprestidae
- Genus: Stigmodera
- Species: S. macularia

Binomial name
- Stigmodera macularia (Donovan, 1805)

= Stigmodera macularia =

Species of beetle

Stigmodera macularia, is a species of beetle in the family Buprestidae restricted to Southeastern Australia.

== Description ==
Stigmodera macularia have yellow elytra with a deeply pitted surface. The puncturations are colored in black and the pronotum is dark.

== Gallery ==
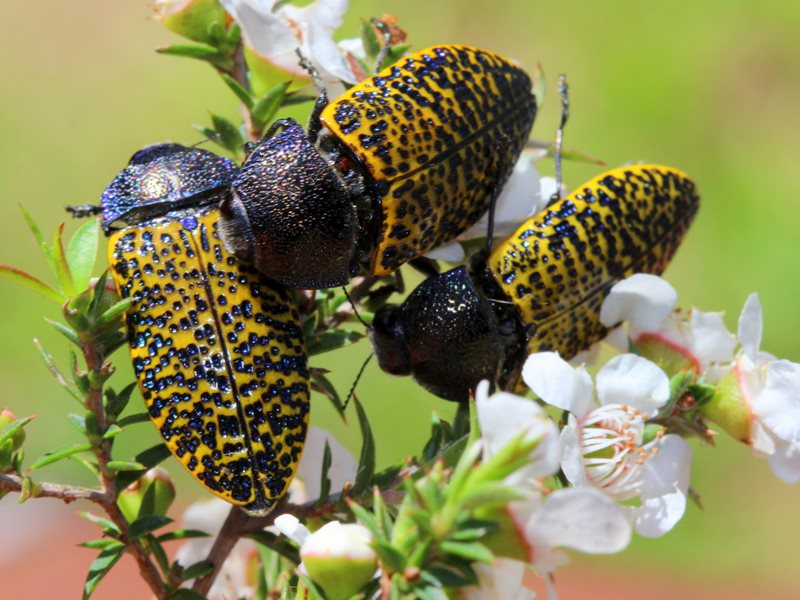
Stigmodera macularia

== Distribution ==
This species can be found mainly in Victoria and New South Wales.
