= William Bailey (British Army officer) =

British Army officer in the two world wars

Stanley William Bailey
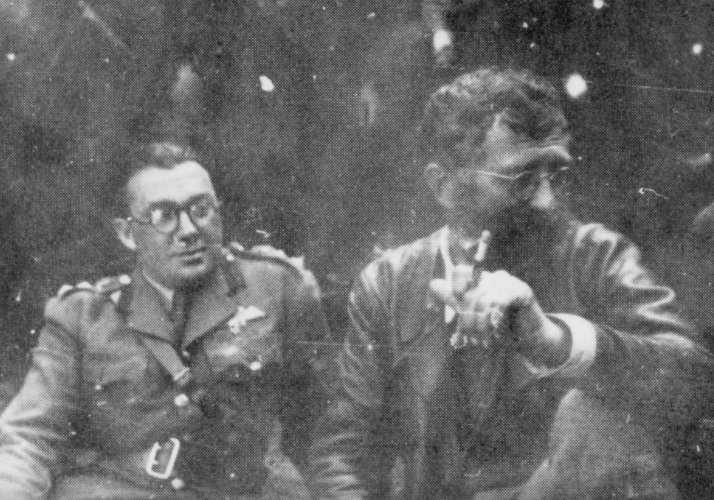
- William Bailey (left) and Draža Mihailović
- Military career
- Allegiance: United Kingdom
- Branch: British Army
- Rank: Colonel
- Nicknames: Bill, Miloš
- Service number: 133406
- Conflicts: World War I World War II

Stanley William Bailey OBE was a British Army officer in World War II, who reached the rank of colonel and was the head and then political advisor of the British Special Operations Executive Liaison Mission to the Chetnik Forces of Draža Mihailović from 25 December 1942—29 January 1944. British policy toward Mihailović was shaped by the regular reports from Bailey. Bailey's position on General Mihailović was influential in the relationship between Mihailović and the Chetniks with Churchill and the British Foreign Office, and consequently with the other Allied nations.

== Early life ==
Bailey attended Emanuel School in Wandsworth, in London, England. Before the Second World War, Bailey lived in Kingdom of Yugoslavia for some time when he was an engineer in the Trepča Mines. He learned to speak the Serbian language fluently. During the First World War Bailey was a member of the British SOE team in Athens, Greece when the king of Greece was removed and pro-Allied Venizelist government installed.

== World War II ==
Upon returning from a mission in Canada, Bailey was parachuted into Mihailović's headquarters on 25 December 1942, as a British Liaison Officer (BLO) for the British SOE mission to Mihailović. The chief of Bailey's staff in the Chetnik headquarters was Major Kenneth Greenlees.

=== Head of Allied Mission at Chetnik HQ ===
Apart from this mission headed by Bailey, there were nine other British missions to Chetnik commanders beginning in April 1943. Bailey reported to his superiors that Mihailović had the overwhelming support of the people in Serbia while the strength of Communists there was negligible. Mihailović gave the code name "Miloš" to Bailey, either with reference to Kosovo, where Bailey lived previous to his military service, or in reference to the Serbian hero of the Battle of Kosovo, Miloš Obilić.

=== Crisis in Africa ===
The British General Harold Alexander sent a personal telegram to Draža Mihailović before the Allied offensive against Rommel in Africa, requesting him to organize a large-scale campaign against Axis lines of communication in order to obstruct transport of German war materièl through Serbia to Thessaloniki and from there to Libya. After his arrival at Chetnik headquarters, Bailey decided to reinforce the British mission to the Chetniks with well-trained British military sappers who could help the Chetniks to be more effective in sabotaging German lines of communication. In May 1942 Mihailović demanded heavy explosives from the British command that would be used to cut the German supply line running through Serbia and the Aegean to German forces in North Africa. The successful accomplishment of this sabotage campaign was witnessed by fellow SOE liaison officer, Colonel "Bill" Hudson. On 1 December 1942, Mihailović received a greeting from the Chief of the British Imperial General Staff, Alan Brooke who expressed his felicitations for this wonderful achievement of the Yugoslav Army. Mihailović's disruption of Axis communications was probably instrumental in victory of Allies against Rommel in Africa, so the British Near East Command jointly sent a telegram to Mihailovic on 16 August 1943, stating: "With admiration we are following your directed operations which are of inestimable value to our allied cause." Hitler blamed the Chetniks in Serbia for his defeat in Africa and issued an order for the complete annihilation of all Chetnik forces. Evidence for this exists in a letter sent to Mussolini in a letter on 16 February 1943:

We have no other choice, but to annihilate all Chetniks and use the most brutal means against the bandits.

— Adolf Hitler

By 1942, Yugoslav Partisans had begun to allege that Mihailović's Chetniks were collaborating with German forces. Bailey, though confirming Colonel Hudson's earlier reports about agreements between some Montenegrin Chetniks and the Italians, emphasized that he found "no evidence of direct collaboration between Mihailović himself and the Germans and Italians."

While he was in Lipovo, Bailey went to Kolašin three times, one of these times in February when he visited Pavle Đurišić and inspected Chetnik units before their departure to Neretva. On this occasion Bailey offered to Đurišić British support to replace Mihailović as Chetnik leader, but Đurišić refused and personally informed Mihailović about this offer.

=== British Convince Mihailović they Could "Make Him or Break Him" ===
When the crisis of Allies in Africa had passed, the Chetniks reverted to a policy of tactical inactivity toward the Axis forces, which was criticized by the British. In his report sent to SOE headquarters in Cairo, Bailey emphasized: "...the time has come to treat Mihailović firmly. He must be made to realize that we could make him or break him." Starting in December 1943, the United Kingdom withdrew all support from Mihailović and his Yugoslav Army of the Homeland (Chetniks), and began exclusively to support and heavily supply the Partisan Communist forces in Yugoslavia. Prior to this, beginning in 1942, the BBC repeatedly gave credit to communists for anti-Axis action performed, in reality, by Mihailović's Chetniks, this was especially true during September and October 1943, which contributed to an official policy increasingly set against Mihailović. Nevertheless, Mihailović launched a campaign against Axis positions in Eastern Bosnia in October 1943, inflicting hundreds of casualties on Axis forces and liberating Višegrad, Rogatica and many other places. Still the British media, following the BBC, attributed each Chetnik victory to rival Communist forces. This enraged the Chetniks to the extent that, before Brigadier Charles Armstrong was dispatched to Chetnik headquarters in July 1943, Colonel Bailey advised him that Chetniks were angry and that, "Mihailović "won't hear of the British anymore". When Armstrong arrived at Mihailović's Chetnik headquarters at the end of September 1943, he became the head of British mission and Bailey assumed position of his political advisor. Bailey organized the handing over arms of the Italian Venezia division of 8,000 Italian soldiers to the Communists instead of to the Chetniks.

The head of the American Mission to General Mihailović, Capt. Walter R. Mansfield, proposed to retain one member of the British and American army with Mihailović after Armstrong and Mansfield left it, but Bailey refused this proposal. Bailey left Yugoslavia for Bari on 29 January 1944.

== See also ==
- Western betrayal

== Sources ==
- Barker, Elisabeth (1976). British policy in South-East Europe in the Second World War. Barnes & Noble Books. ISBN 978-0-06-490301-1.
- Charters, David; Tugwell, Maurice (1990). Deception Operations: Studies in the East-West Context. Brassey's. ISBN 978-0-08-036706-4.
- Ford, Kirk (1992). OSS and the Yugoslav resistance, 1943-1945. Texas A&M University Press. ISBN 978-0-89096-517-7.
- Jukić, Ilija (1974). The fall of Yugoslavia. Harcourt Brace Jovanovich. ISBN 9780151301003.
- Latas, Branko (1979). Četnički pokret Draže Mihailovića: 1941-1945. Beogradski izdavačko-grafički zavod.
- MacLaren, Roy (1 November 2011). Canadians Behind Enemy Lines, 1939-1945. UBC Press. ISBN 978-0-7748-4241-9.
- Milazzo, Matteo J. (1 March 1975). The Chetnik movement & the Yugoslav resistance. Johns Hopkins University Press. ISBN 9780801815898.
- Minich, Mihailo (1975). Excerpts from the Book "The Scattered Bones". Minich.
- Ogden, Alan (2010). Through Hitler's Back Door: SOE Operations in Hungary, Slovakia, Romania and Bulgaria 1939-1945. Pen & Sword Military. ISBN 978-1-84884-248-9.
- Pešić, Miodrag D. (2002). Operation Air Bridge: Serbian Chetniks and the Rescued American Airmen in World War II. Serbian Master's Society. ISBN 978-86-82235-12-5.
- Piekałkiewicz, Janusz (January 1984). Krieg auf dem Balkan, 1940-1945. Südwest. ISBN 978-3-517-00790-8.
- Redžić, Vučeta (2002). Građanski rat u Crnoj Gori: Dešavanja od sredine 1942. godine do sredine 1945. godine. Stupovi.
- Repac, Stanley (1957). Draza Mihailovich. University of Wisconsin--Madison.
- West, Richard (15 November 2012). Tito and the Rise and Fall of Yugoslavia. Faber & Faber. ISBN 978-0-571-28110-7.
