= Bojan Dimitrijević =

Bojan Dimitrijević may refer to:

- Bojan Dimitrijević (actor) (born 1973), Serbian actor
- Bojan Dimitrijević (historian) (born 1968), Serbian historian
- Bojan Dimitrijević (politician) (born 1963), Serbian politician and former cabinet minister
