= Stigmodera sanguinosa =

Scientific classification
- Kingdom: Animalia
- Phylum: Arthropoda
- Class: Insecta
- Order: Coleoptera
- Suborder: Polyphaga
- Infraorder: Elateriformia
- Family: Buprestidae
- Genus: Stigmodera
- Species: S. sanguinosa

Binomial name
- Stigmodera sanguinosa (Hope, 1846)

Species of beetle

Stigmodera sanguinosa, is a species of beetle in the family Buprestidae found throughout the southern parts of Australia.

== Description ==
Stigmodera sanguinosa has brown elytra which are deeply pitted. The pronotum is blackish.

== Distribution ==
This species can be found in the southern states of Australia.
