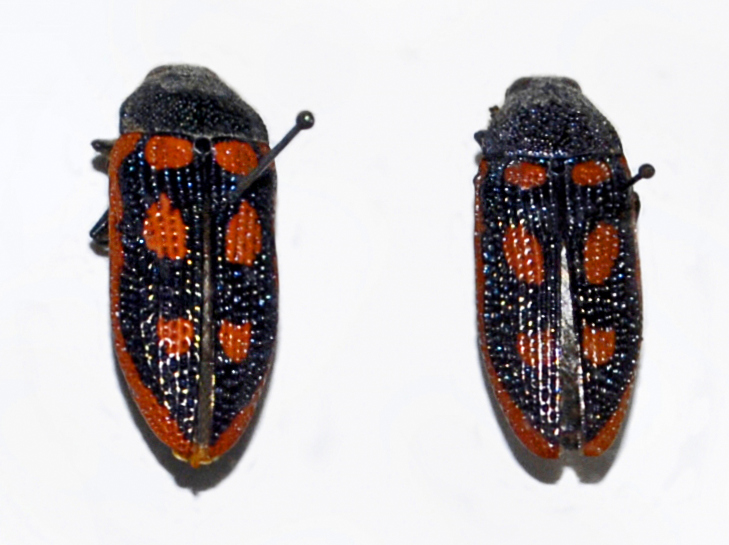
- Stigmodera cancellata

Scientific classification
- Kingdom: Animalia
- Phylum: Arthropoda
- Class: Insecta
- Order: Coleoptera
- Suborder: Polyphaga
- Infraorder: Elateriformia
- Family: Buprestidae
- Genus: Stigmodera
- Species: Stigmodera

Binomial name
- Stigmodera Eschscholtz, 1829

= Stigmodera =

Genus of beetles

Stigmodera is a genus of beetles in the family Buprestidae, the jewel beetles. It is a large genus that some authors divide into three separate genera. Others keep them together, making Stigmodera a genus of some 550 species. Most are native to Australia and a few occur in New Guinea.

Species include:

- Stigmodera cancellata (Donovan, 1805)
- Stigmodera gratiosa Chevrolat, 1843
- Stigmodera hyperboreus (Heer, 1870)
- Stigmodera jacquinotii (Boisduval, 1835)
- Stigmodera macularia (Donovan, 1805)
- Stigmodera porosa Carter, 1916
- Stigmodera roei Saunders, 1868
- Stigmodera sanguinosa Hope, 1846
