= Institute of Contemporary History =

Institute of Contemporary History may refer to:

- The Wiener Library and Institute of Contemporary History, London, England
- Institut für Zeitgeschichte, Munich, Germany
- Inštitut za novejšo zgodovino, Ljubljana, Slovenia
- Samtidshistoriska institutet, Södertörn University College, Stockholm, Sweden
- Institute of Contemporary History, University of Vienna
- Institute of Contemporary History, Czech Academy of Sciences
- Institute of Contemporary History, Belgrade

== See also ==
- Contemporary History Institute, Athens, Ohio, United States
- Centre for Contemporary History, Potsdam, Germany
