= Ljubljana Gap =

Coordinates: 45°45′35.49″N 14°11′39.61″E

The Ljubljana Gap, less often the Ljubljana Gate (Slovene: Ljubljanska vrata), is a geographical term for the transition area between the Alps and Dinaric Alps that passes from southwest to northeast between Trieste and Ljubljana.

A strategically-vital mountain pass in Europe, it is named after Ljubljana, the capital city of Slovenia.
