= Sludka =

Sludka Слудка
- Selo
- Location within Perm Krai Location within Russia
- Coordinates: 56°28′N 55°58′E
- Country: Russia
- Region: Perm Krai
- District: Chernushinsky District
- Time zone: UTC+5:00

Sludka (Russian: Слудка) is a rural locality (a selo) and the administrative center of Sludovskoye Rural Settlement, Chernushinsky District, Perm Krai, Russia. The population was 572 as of 2010. There are 10 streets.

== Geography ==
Sludka is located 10 km southwest of Chernushka (the district's administrative centre) by road. Verkh-Kiga is the nearest rural locality.
