= London Museum and Institute of Natural History =

Museum in London from 1807 to 1817

Coordinates: 51°30′42″N 0°07′08″W

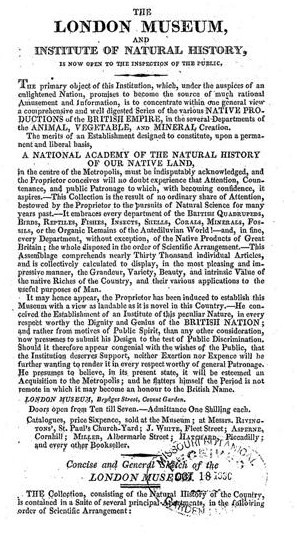
front of the 1808 Catalogue

The London Museum and Institute of Natural History was a private natural history museum of the Georgian era. It opened to a paying public in 1807.

The museum was founded by Edward Donovan at Catherine Street, the Strand, London, England. Unlike William Bullock's Egyptian Hall Donovan's museum focused on specimens found in Great Britain and was a scientific collection arranged according to the Linnaean system.

The museum exhibited hundreds of cases of specimens of British mammals, birds, reptiles, fishes, insects, shells, corals, minerals, fossils (or "productions of the Antediluvian World") and botanical specimens. The 1808 catalogue numbers the collection at "nearly thirty thousand individual articles" and describes the museum as "a national academy of the natural history of the country". The botany section was described as the "most perfect assemblage of the botanical productions of Great Britain that can exist in any museum".

The London Museum and Institute of Natural History promoted the sale of Donovan's sumptuously illustrated natural history publications which were based on the specimens exhibited. The museum closed in the spring of 1817 and its contents were auctioned in 1818.
