= Tanit Koch =

German journalist

- Born: August 2, 1977; Konstanz, Germany
- Citizenship: German
- Education: University of Tübingen, University of Cologne, Sciences Po
- Occupations: Journalist, political communication advisor
- Years active: 2005–present
- Employer(s): Axel Springer SE (former), n-tv (former), RTL Germany (former), The New European
- Known for: First female editor-in-chief of Bild
- Notable work: Germansplaining (column)
- Partner: Oliver Masucci (since 2019)

Tanit Koch (born 2 August 1977 in Konstanz) is a journalist and regular contributor to the British weekly The New European. She was the first female editor-in-chief of the German tabloid newspaper Bild.

== Early life and education ==
Koch principally grew up in Bonn, Germany, but spent part of her youth in Dublin, where she went to St Columba's College, an Irish boarding school. After acquiring the Leaving Certificate, she studied at the universities of Tübingen and Cologne as well as at Sciences Po (Institut d'Études Politiques) in Paris and holds degrees in law and political science.

== Career ==
=== Journalism ===
Tanit Koch joined Axel Springer SE as a trainee at the Bild politics and business desk in 2005, while attending the company's journalism school. She worked in several editorial roles, among them bureau chief of Bild's Hamburg edition and senior editor at Welt Group, before being promoted Deputy Editor of Bild in 2013. In January 2016, she was appointed Editor-in-Chief of Bild, being the first woman to obtain this position at the controversial yet influential tabloid paper..

In 2018, Koch left Axel Springer after a power struggle with Bild editor digital, Julian Reichelt, who was sacked in 2021. In a farewell email to her colleagues Koch wrote that "when two people don't work in professional harmony" this could be balanced out by compromises for a while. "2017 was marked by this, until my willingness to compromise reached its limits."

In March 2019, Koch was appointed managing director of the German independent news channel n-tv. In addition, she led the digital transformation at RTL Germany as the Editor of its newly created integrated newsroom. Under her management, ntv was the only German news channel to receive a special TV award for outstanding achievements during the coverage of the COVID-19 pandemic. Koch left her roles in late 2020 but continued to co-host the podcast Die Stunde Null.

During the management buyout of The New European in 2021, the anti-Brexit weekly founded in the aftermath of the EU referendum, Koch formed part of the investor consortium including CNN CEO Mark Thompson and former FT editor Lionel Barber. Together with Alastair Campbell, Bonnie Greer and Will Self, Koch is a regular contributor to the award-winning paper. She writes the weekly column Germansplaining and is a regular commentator on German and European affairs for political talkshows.

=== Political communication ===
In the 2021 federal election campaign in Germany, Koch served as communications advisor to CDU chancellor candidate Armin Laschet, who eventually lost against his SPD competitor Olaf Scholz, the current German chancellor.

== Personal life ==
Koch has been in a relationship with the German actor Oliver Masucci since 2019.
