= Duboko Mokro =

Mokro Мокро
- Village
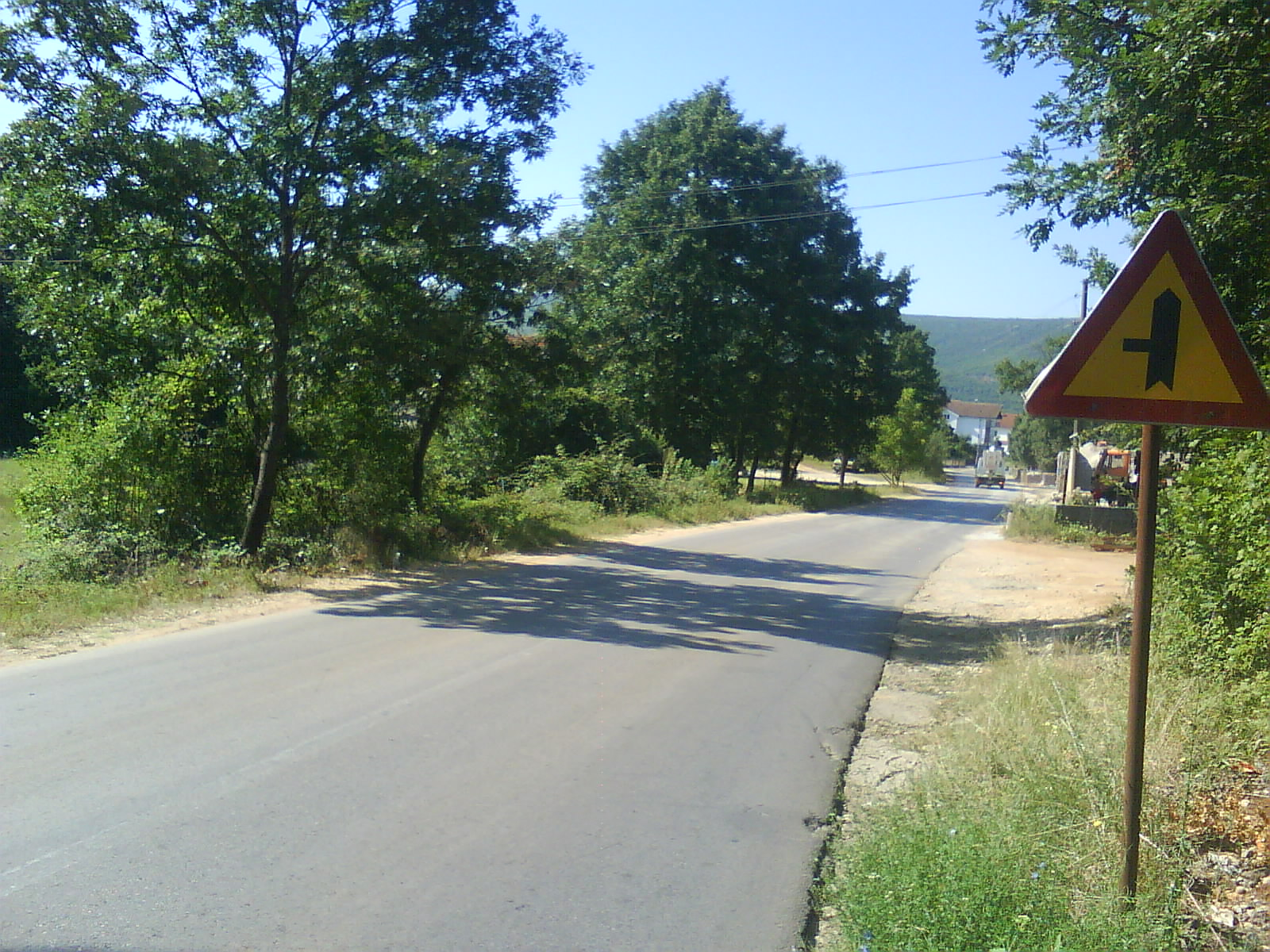

- Location within Bosnia and Herzegovina
- Coordinates: 43.359303°N 17.566295°E
- Country: Bosnia and Herzegovina
- Entity: Federation of Bosnia and Herzegovina
- Canton: West Herzegovina
- Municipality: Široki Brijeg

Area
  - Total: 4.07 sq mi (10.54 km^{2})

Population (2013)
  - Total: 1,411
  - Density: 346.7/sq mi (133.9/km^{2})
- Time zone: UTC+1 (CET)
  - Summer (DST): UTC+2 (CEST)

Mokro (Serbian: Мокро) is a village in Bosnia and Herzegovina. According to the 1991 census, the village is located in the municipality of Široki Brijeg.

Within the municipality of Široki Brijeg, a new settlement Mokro was created by merging the settlements Duboko Mokro and Pribinovići.

== Demographics ==
According to the 2013 census, its population was 1,411.

Ethnicity in 2013
Ethnicity	Number	Percentage
Croats	1,403	99.4%
Serbs	1	0.1%
other/undeclared	7	0.5%
Total	1,411	100%
