= Institute of Bavarian History =

Research institute at LMU Munich

The Institute of Bavarian History at LMU Munich (Ludwig-Maximilians-Universität München) in Munich is a centre of research and teaching of Bavarian history in a European context. It is located in the building complex of the Bavarian State Archives and in the immediate vicinity of the Bavarian State Library.

== Function and structure ==
The Institute researches and teaches the history of Bavaria from the early Middle Ages to recent contemporary history in close cooperation with non-university institutions such as the Commission of Bavarian Regional History (Kommission für bayerische Landesgeschichte) at the Bavarian Academy of Sciences and Humanities (Bayerische Akademie der Wissenschaften), the Bavarian State Archives (Bayerisches Hauptstaatsarchiv) and the "House of Bavarian History" (Haus der Bayerischen Geschichte). It organizes lectures and colloquia, issues a number of publication series, supports talented students as well as graduates and provides a fellowship for international historians.

Holding about 30,000 volumes, the Institute’s library is the leading research library on Bavarian history and also contains literature on the history of other European states and regions. The Institute is a central institution of LMU Munich. It is currently headed by Ferdinand Kramer and Dieter J. Weiß, the two chair-holding professors for Bavarian history, alongside the Director General of the Bavarian State Archives (currently Margit Ksoll-Marcon). Further members of the Institute are: Prof. Waldemar Fromm (history of literature), Dr. Irmtraut Heitmeier (early middle ages), Prof. Manfred Heim (church history), Prof. Stephan Hoppe (art history), Prof. Hans-Georg Hermann (legal history), and Prof. Bernd Päffgen (archeology).

It is supported by a board of trustees headed by the former Director-General of Bayerischer Rundfunk, Prof. Albert Scharf. It also includes Duke Franz of Bavaria, the former Minister of Culture and Art Ludwig Spaenle, the former Bavarian MP Hildegard Kronawitter, the former Federal Minister of Finance Theo Waigel, and other individuals from public life. The alumni of the institute have founded the Gesellschaft der Münchner Landeshistoriker (Society of Munich Regional Historians), which awards the Michael Doeberl Prize to outstanding graduates every year. In addition, the institute is supported by the Eginhard and Franziska Jungmann Foundation and the Michael Doeberl Foundation.

== Research ==
The Institute's research work has resulted in a variety of cooperation projects, including important standard works on Bavarian history, such as the Handbuch der Bayerischen Geschichte (the so-called "Spindler", a handbook on Bavarian History), the Bayerischer Geschichtsatlas (i.e. Atlas of Bavarian History), the Historischer Atlas von Bayern (a standard book series on regional history on the basis of Bavaria’s several administration units), the Handbuch der Historischen Stätten Bayern (i.e. Handbook of historical sites in Bavaria), as well as the new online project Historisches Lexikon Bayerns (i.e. Historical Lexicon of Bavaria). The institute currently focuses on a number of projects such as:

- Medieval structure of rule, administration and social life
- Nobility and the court of Bavaria
- Social History of early modern times
- Foreign relations of Bavaria as part of a European network
- Cultural heritage and memory
- Crises, democracy and transformation in the 20th century
- Bavaria and the European integration process
- History of radio and television
- Religion, culture, state and society
- Development of internet-based scientific tools for Bavarian regional history, see: www.historisches-lexikon-bayerns.de; www.bavarikon.de; www.bavarian-studies.org

The Institute publishes the Münchner Historische Studien (i.e. Munich Historical Studies), the Forschungen zur Landes- und Regionalgeschichte (i.e. Research on State and Regional History), the Quellentexte zur bayerischen Geschichte (i.e. Source Texts on Bavarian History), as well as the book series Bayerische Landesgeschichte und Europäische Regionalgeschichte (i.e. Bavarian State History and European Regional History).

== History ==
In 1898, Germany’s first chair for Landesgeschichte (regional history) was established at LMU Munich and first occupied by Sigmund von Riezler (1898–1917). His successors were Michael Doeberl (1917–1928), Karl Alexander von Müller (1928–1936) and Max Spindler (1946-1960). After the end of World War II, Max Spindler and the Bavarian Prime Minister Wilhelm Hoegner initiated the founding of the Institute of Bavarian History, which was officially established by the university and state government on 28 February 1947. The Institute aimed at the creation of an "intellectual and cultural foundation for the new Free State of Bavaria" through state historical research and scientific education. In the process, Bavarian history was increasingly researched in its European networks. Max Spindler was followed by Karl Bosl (1960–1977), Andreas Kraus (1977–1989), Walter Ziegler (1989–2002) and Ferdinand Kramer (since 2003). When an additional chair was established in 1974, it was first occupied by Friedrich Prinz (1976–1995), followed by Alois Schmid (1998–2010) and Dieter J. Weiß (since 2011). As a result of the structural reform of LMU Munich, the Institute was reorganized to become a central academic institution of the university in 2005.

== Literature ==
- Ulrike Braun: Vom Lehrstuhl für bayerische Landesgeschichte zum Institut für Bayerische Geschichte, in: Sabine Rehm-Deutinger (Ed.): Chronica Bavariae. Munich 1999, pp. 91–129.
- Claudia Friemberger, Ferdinand Kramer, Martin Ott and others: Institut für Bayerische Geschichte 1947–2012, Munich 2012.
- Andreas Kraus: Bayerische Geschichtswissenschaft in drei Jahrhunderten. Gesammelte Aufsätze, Munich 1979.
- Edmund Stoiber: 60 Jahre Institut für Bayerische Geschichte. Die Bedeutung der Landesgeschichte für die Modernisierung Bayerns, in: Zeitschrift für bayerische Landesgeschichte 70, 2007, pp. 1–9.
- Gertrud Diepolder: Gründerjahre, in: Wilhelm Volkert (Ed.): Im Dienst der Bayerischen Geschichte. 70 Jahre Kommission für bayerische Landesgeschichte, 50 Jahre Institut für Bayerische Geschichte (=Schriftenreihe zur Bayerischen Landesgeschichte 111), Munich 1998, pp. 453–484.
- Wilhelm Volkert, Walter Ziegler (Eds.): Im Dienst der bayerischen Geschichte. 70 Jahre Kommission für Bayerische Landesgeschichte. 50 Jahre Institut für Bayerische Geschichte. 2nd Edition. Munich 1999, ISBN 3-406-10692-7.
- Ferdinand Kramer: Max Spindler (1894–1986) und Karl Bosl (1908–1993), in: Katharina Weigand (Ed.): Münchner Historiker zwischen Politik und Wissenschaft. 150 Jahre Historisches Seminar der Ludwig-Maximilians-Universität (Beiträge zur Geschichte der Ludwig-Maximilians-Universität München), Munich 2010, pp. 259–279.
- Katharina Weigand: Sigmund von Riezler (1843–1927) und Michael Doeberl (1861–1928). In: Katharina Weigand (Ed.): Münchner Historiker zwischen Politik und Wissenschaft. 150 Jahre Historisches Seminar der Ludwig-Maximilians-Universität (Beiträge zur Geschichte der Ludwig-Maximilians-Universität München. Band 5). Munich 2010, ISBN 978-3-8316-0969-7, pp. 159–184.
