= Edward Donovan =

Anglo-Irish writer, natural history illustrator, and amateur zoologist

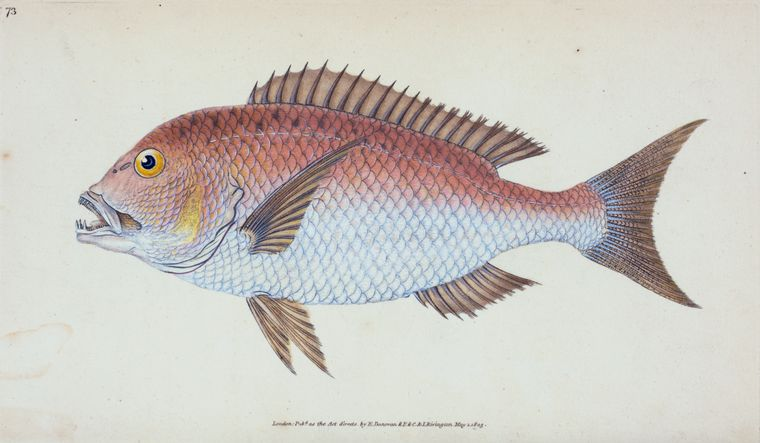
Illustration by Edward Donovan, c. 1802–1808

Edward Donovan (1768 – 1 February 1837) was an Anglo-Irish writer, natural history illustrator, and amateur zoologist. He did not travel, but collected, described and illustrated many species based on the collections of other naturalists. His many books were successful in his time. He died penniless in 1837 leaving a large family destitute.

== Personal life ==
Almost nothing is known about Donovan's family background, education or early life, although he is known to have been born in Cork, Ireland, and was originally surnamed O'Donovan. He is presumed to have had some independent wealth. His health declined in later years and he died penniless at his home in John Street in 1837 leaving a large family destitute.

== Biography ==
Aged 21, he moved to London. He was an avid collector of natural history specimens purchased mainly at auctions of specimens from voyages of exploration. He was a fellow of the Linnean Society and the Wernerian Society which gave him access to the best collections and libraries in London. It was quite common for private collectors to open small public museums, and in 1807 he founded the London Museum and Institute of Natural History. According to the catalogues and contemporary reviews, this exhibited several hundred cases of world birds, mammals, reptiles, fish, molluscs, insects, corals and other invertebrates and botanical specimens and other exotica alongside his British collections. Entry cost 1 shilling. It had public education about natural history as an objective, as well as value as source material for his publications. However, the museum was not as financially successful as he hoped.

Donovan was, at first, the very successful author of a number of natural history titles, including The Natural History of British Birds (1792–97), The Natural History of British Insects(1792–1813), The Natural History of British Fishes (1802–08) and the two-volume Descriptive Excursions Through South Wales and Monmouthshire in the Year 1804, and the Four Preceding Summers (1805) and the short-lived Botanical Review, or the Beauties of Flora (London, 1789–90).

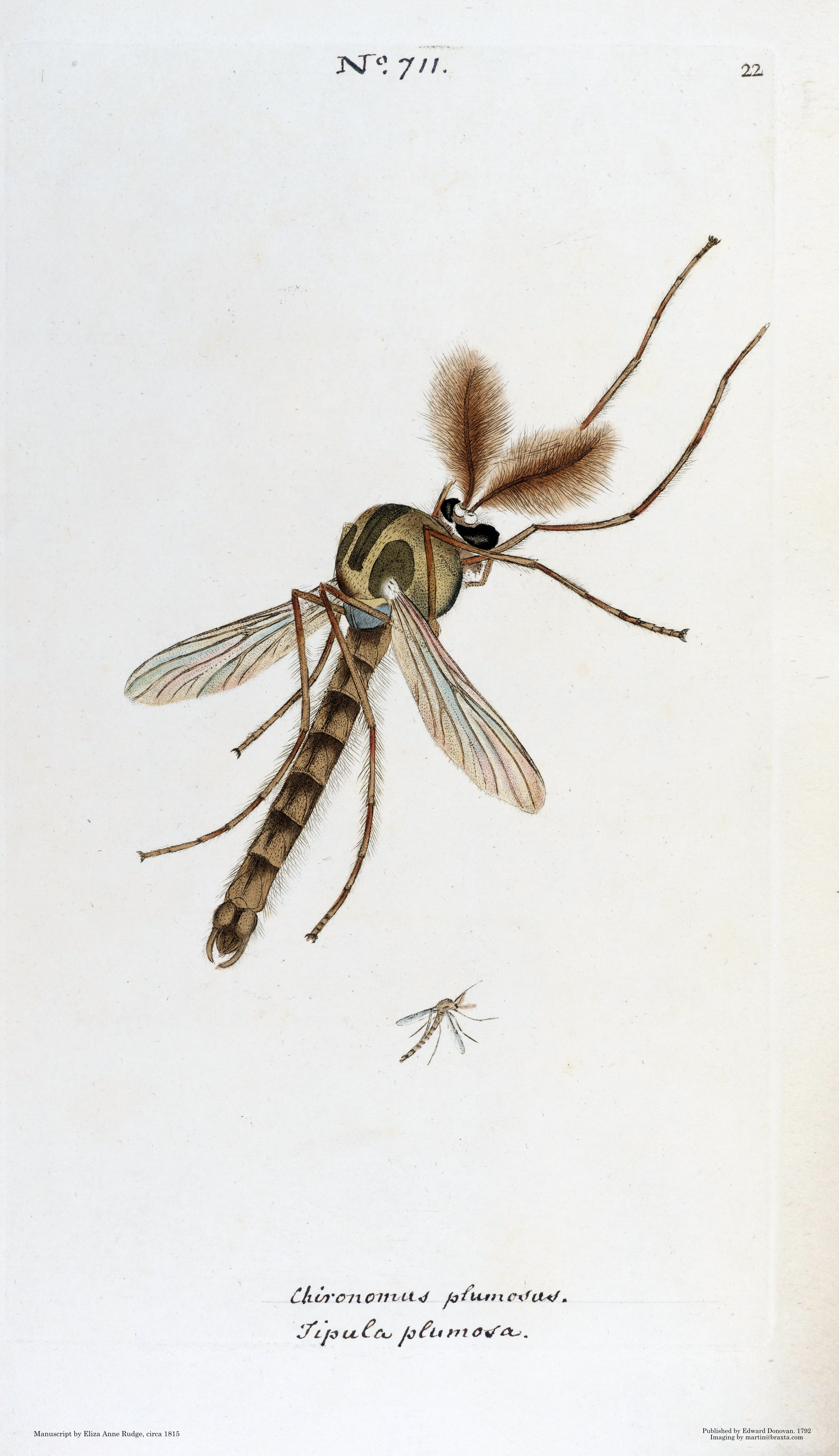
Crane Fly - Chironomus plumosus from Edward Donovan's British Insects published 1792

He also wrote articles on conchology, entomology, etc., made drawings and arranged the natural history plates in Rees's Cyclopædia and undertook commissions for private albums of his botanical artwork. His works typically appealed both to serious naturalists, through the careful descriptions and a more general readership because of the attractive illustrations.

His best known works are The Natural History of British Insects(1792–1813), An Epitome of the Natural History of the Insects of China (1798) and Insects of India, and the Islands in the Indian Seas (1800) and Insects of New Holland, New Zealand, New Guinea, Otaheite, and Other Islands in the Indian, Southern and Pacific Oceans (1805).

His reputation was established by the 16 volume work The natural history of British insects published from 1792 to 1813. Each contained high quality plates illustrating the life-cycles of the insects, which he often drew from life. It was initially intended to consist of 10 volumes, but he later added a further six. A surviving, heavily annotated complete first edition, proof set comprises 840 individual species illustrated within 636 hand coloured large octavo copper plate engravings. Normal copies comprise 576 plates. Earlier volumes were written in English but the later ones were partly in Latin as Donovan became more knowledgeable and perhaps to appeal to a more specialist, but international, readership. It was referenced by several later authors.

He was a well-connected and respected member of the gentleman naturalist community. Evidence includes that his successful nomination for election as a Fellow of the Linnean Society in 1799 was supported by six members (Alexander Macleay, James Sowerby, William Lewis, Thomas Marsham, George Milne and Frederick Kanmacher), rather than the more usual three.

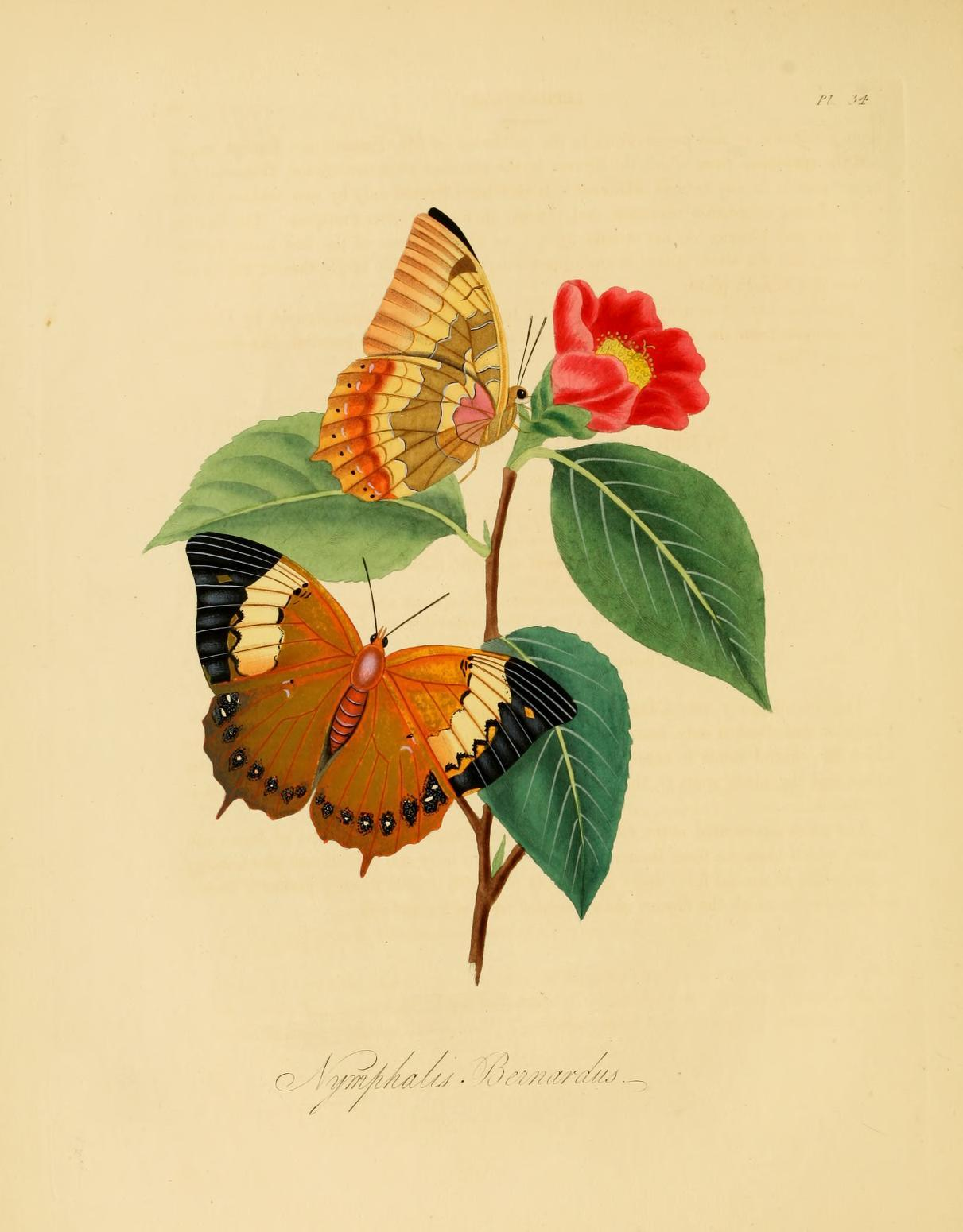
Plate from An Epitome of the Natural History of the Insects of China

Apart from occasional excursions in England and Wales, Donovan never left London. His Insects of New Holland is based on specimens collected by Joseph Banks and William Bayly, an astronomer on the second and third voyages of James Cook, specimens in the collection of Dru Drury and other private collections as well as his own museum. It is the first publication dealing exclusively with the insects of Australia. In the preface Donovan writes "There is perhaps, no extent of country in the world, that can boast a more copious or diversified assemblage of interesting objects in every department of natural history than New Holland and its contiguous island". Most of the plates depict butterflies together with exotic plants. Donovan often used thick paints, burnished highlights, albumen overglazes and metallic paints. These covered the engravings (from his own copper plates, Donovan personally undertook all steps of the illustration process for his books, the drawing, the etching and engraving and the hand colouring, working with a team of several employees) which are not visible. At other times the fineness of his engraving and etching is apparent giving his illustrations the appearance of being watercolours.

For An Epitome of the Natural History of the Insects of China he obtained specimens and information from George Macartney a British envoy to China.

For Insects of India Donovan described and figured specimens in his own cabinet, that were originally collected by the late Duchess of Portland, Marmaduke Tunstall, a Governor Holford (many years resident in India), a Mr. Ellis, George Keate, a Mr. Yeats, and a Mr. Bailey. He also studied the collections of John Francillon, Dru Drury and Alexander Macleay. His patron was Joseph Banks. It is the first illustrated publication dealing with the entomology of India. The exact publication date, stated on the title page as being 1800, is also unclear as most plates are later; for example, the plate for Cicada indica is dated 1 February 1804. Many of the butterflies figured are from the Americas. In the works of Johan Christian Fabricius on which the Epitome was based "Indiis" confusingly refers to the West Indies or northern South America.

He co-published his books with a book-seller instead of the more usual arrangement of working with a publisher.

Donovan's expensive purchases, his dealings with (according to him) his unscrupulous book seller Rivingtons of St Paul's Churchyard (after many previous years on good terms), and the economic decline in England after the Napoleonic Wars, always made his financial position precarious. He had begun selling parts of his collections in 1788 and was forced to close his museum in 1817. The main auction of his collection in 1818 took eight days. He continued to publish, but his financial position worsened. His collection was an important resource for his publications and its dispersal caused problems. In 1833 he made an unsuccessful published plea for funds from his supporters to bring a lawsuit against Rivingtons.

Donovan's grave in the burial register of St Mary's Church, Newington notes that "Elijah Edward Donovan" was buried on 28 February. The memorial stone which is now completely lost read: "Sacred to the memory of Jane Donovan who departed this life on the 9th day of Feby 1813, aged 74 years also of Margaret Willoughby Donovan, the beloved Wife of Elijah Edward Donovan Esqr. who died on the 31st day of Octr. 1822, aged 55 years also of the said Elijah Edward Donovan F.L.S. & F.Z.S. &c. &c. &c. who died on the 1st day of Feby. 1837 Aged 61 years. A man of great genius, and one of the brightest ornaments of natural philosophy, possessing great literary attainments, and an eminent author of natural history. He promoted the views of science, the extension of knowledge and the arts, and strictly observed the fulfilment of every duty that society could demand."

== Works ==
- Botanical Review, Or the Beauties of Flora. London. 1789–1790.
- The Natural History of British Insects: Explaining Them in Their Several States, With the Periods of Their Transformations, Their Food, Oeconomy, &c. Together With the History of Such Minute Insects As Require Investigation by the Microscope, the Whole Illustrated by Coloured Figures, Designed and Executed from Living Specimens. London. F. and C. Rivington. 1792–1813. 16 volumes with a total of 576 plates (568 coloured).
- The Natural History of British Birds: Or, a Selection of the Most Rare, Beautiful, and Interesting Birds Which Inhabit this Country. London. 1794–1819. 10 volumes with a total of 244 plates.
- The Natural History of British Fishes: Including Scientific and General Descriptions of the Most Interesting Species, and an Extensive Selection of Accurately Finished Coloured Plates, Taken Entirely from Original Drawings, Purposely Made from the Specimens in a Recent State, and for the Most Part Whilst Living. London. F. and C. Rivington, 1802–08.
- The Naturalist's Repository, or Miscellany of Exotic Natural History: Exhibiting Rare and Beautiful Specimens of Foreign Birds, Insects, Shells, Quadrupeds, Fish and Marine Productions. London. 1822–1827. 5 volumes with a total of 180 plates.
- The Natural History of British Shells: Including Figures and Descriptions of All the Species Hitherto Discovered in Great Britain, Systematically Arranged in the Linnean Manner, With Scientific and General Observations On Each. 5 volumes.1799-1803
- An Epitome of the Natural History of the Insects of India, and the Islands in the Indian Seas: Comprising Upwards to Two Hundred and Fifty Figures and Descriptions of the Most Singular and Beautiful Species, Selected Chiefly from Those Recently Discovered, and Which Have Not Appeared in the Works of Any Preceding Author. The Figures Are Accurately Drawn, Engraved, and Coloured, from Specimens of the Insects; the Descriptions Are Arranged According to the System of Linnaeus; With References to the Writings of Fabricius, and Other Systematic Authors. London. T. Bensley.
- An Epitome of the Natural History of the Insects of China: Comprising Figures and Descriptions of Upwards of One Hundred New, Singular, and Beautiful Species; Together with some that are of Importance in Medicine, Domestic Economy, &c. London. T. Bensley. 1798.
- An Epitome of the Natural History of the Insects of New Holland, New Zealand, New Guinea, Otaheite, and Other Islands in the Indian, Southern and Pacific Oceans: Including the Figures and Descriptions of One Hundred and Fifty-three Species of the More Splendid, Beautiful, and Interesting Insects, Hitherto Discovered in Those Countries, and Which for the Most Part Have Not Appeared in the Works of Any Preceding Author. The Figures Are Correctly Delineated from Specimens of the Insects; and With the Descriptions Are Arranged According to the Linnean System, With Reference to the Writings of Fabricius and Other Entomologists. London. 1805.
- Instructions for Collecting and Preserving Various Subjects of Natural History: As Quadrupeds, Birds, Reptiles, Fishes, Shells, Corals, Plants, &c.: Together With a Treatise On the Management of Insects in Their Several States; Selected from the Best Authorities. London. Rivington. 1805 (2nd edition).
- Bibliothèque Conchyliologique. Paris. A. Franck.

== Other sources ==
- Gilbert, P. (2000). Butterfly Collectors and Painters: Four Centuries of Colour Plates from the Library Collections of the Natural History Museum, London. Singapore, Beaumont Publishing Pte Ltd.
- Jackson, C. E. (1985). Bird Etchings: The Illustrators and Their Books, 1655-1855. Cornell University Press.
- Lisney, A. A. (1960). Bibliography of British Lepidoptera 1608-1799. London.
- Musgrave, A. (1932). Bibliography of Australian Entomology 1775–1930. Sydney.
- Salmon, M. A. (2000). The Aurelian Legacy: British Butterflies and their Collectors. Martins, Great Horkesley: Harley Books. ISBN 0-946589-40-2
