= Bojan Dimitrijević (historian) =

Serbian historian and politician

Bojan B. Dimitrijević
- Бојан Б. Димитријевић
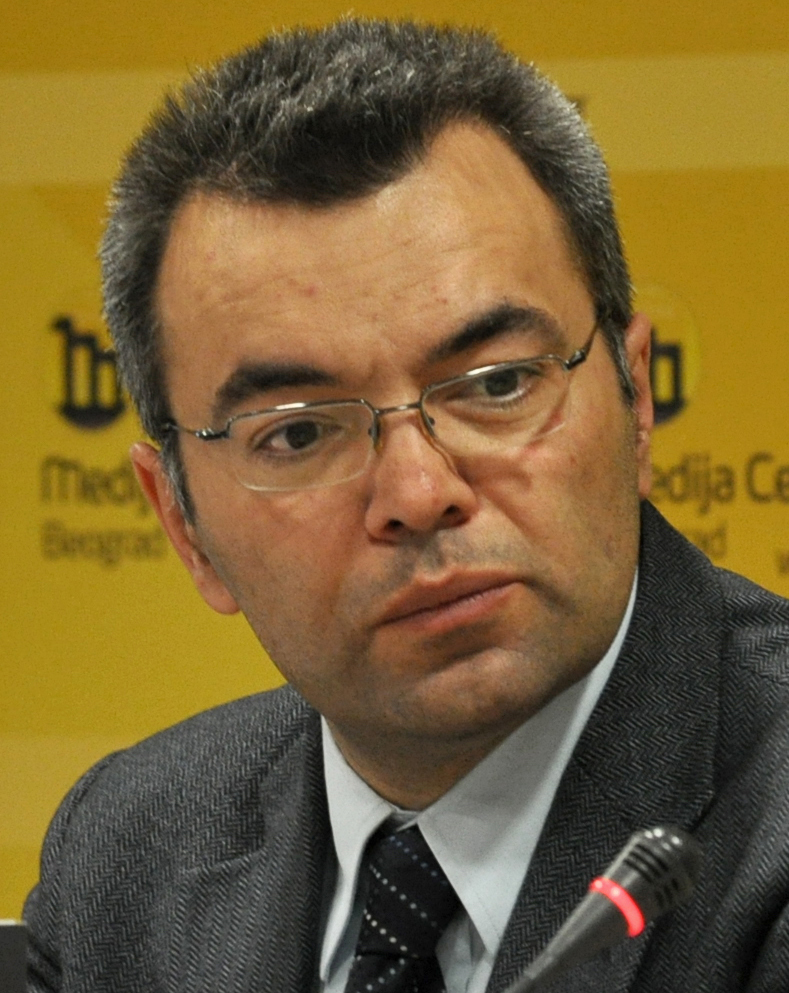
- Dimitrijević in 2013

Personal details
- Born: 1968 (age 57–58) Belgrade, SR Serbia, SFR Yugoslavia
- Party: DS (1990–2015); SRCE (2022–2023)
- Education: University of Belgrade; Central European University; University of Novi Sad

Bojan B. Dimitrijević (Serbian Cyrillic: Бојан Б. Димитријевић; born 1968) is a Serbian historian and politician. A former member of the Democratic Party (DS), he was a vice-president of Serbia Centre (SRCE) from 2022 to 2023.

== Early life and education ==
Dimitrijević was born in 1968 in Belgrade, SR Serbia, SFR Yugoslavia. In 1994, he graduated from the Faculty of Philosophy at the University of Belgrade and obtained his master's degree with a thesis titled "The Yugoslav Army in the Homeland in the Valjevo Region 1941-1945". He obtained another master's degree in 1996 at the Central European University in Budapest with a thesis titled "Royalist Resistance in Northwestern Serbia 1941—1945". He received his PhD at the University of Novi Sad in 2004 with a thesis titled "The Yugoslav People's Army 1945-1954". He completed the Advanced Security System Reform Course at the University of Bradford in 2006.

== Academic career ==
He was the curator of the Yugoslav Air Force Museum at Belgrade Airport from 1991 to 1997. Since 1997, he has been working at the Institute for Contemporary History. He has published over 80 authored and co-authored monographs or other editions, as well as more than 140 articles in Serbia, Croatia, Slovenia, Germany, Great Britain, Italy, the United States, France, Romania and Poland, mostly with military and political topics of the history of Yugoslavia and Serbia in the 20th century. In 2009, he was appointed as a member of the state commission for determining the circumstances of the shooting site of Draža Mihailović, advocating for his rehabilitation.

Critics accuse Dimitrijević of promoting "academic historical revisionism" with his work, which rehabilitates the quisling movements and speaks negatively about Yugoslav Partisans. On several occasions, Dimitrijević made a public affirmative statement about Milan Nedić's role in the World War II, advocating for his rehabilitation. Dimitrijević wrote a biography of convicted war criminal Ratko Mladić and stated that he "has not found evidence that he personally ordered the liquidations in Srebrenica". Dimitrijević was criticized for organizing a lecture in Zagreb together with far-right Croatian politician Zlatko Hasanbegović. Dimitrijević stated that Hasanbegović is ideologically like him. Dimitrijević was also criticized for wearing a t-shirt with the insignia of the 7th SS Volunteer Mountain Division "Prinz Eugen" and for possessing a souvenir with the same insignia in the Institute for Contemporary History.

== Political career ==
Dimitrijević joined the Democratic Party (DS) in 1990. From March 2003 to April 2004, he was an army reform advisor to Boris Tadić, then the defence minister of Serbia and Montenegro. In 2006, he was appointed President Tadić's advisor for military issues. He was also assistant to the minister of defence for human resources and a member of the City Assembly of Belgrade. Dimitrijević was expelled from DS in 2015 due to "relativization of fascism and advocacy for the defense of General Milan Nedić". Dimitrijević stated that he believes that DS has "disgraced both itself and him" with that action and called himself a "scientist who expressed his opinion".

In July 2022, Dimitrijević joined the newly founded centrist political organization Serbia Centre (SRCE) of Zdravko Ponoš and was later elected its vice-president. He left SRCE in November 2023, expressing his support for the New Democratic Party of Serbia instead for the 2023 Serbian parliamentary election.

== Selected works ==
- Đeneral Mihailović, Biografije 1. deo (do maja 1941. godine), Belgrade 1996
- Valjevski ravnogorci, Jugoslovenska vojska u Otadžbini u valjevskom kraju 1941—1945, Valjevo 1998
- Od Staljina do Atlantskog pakta, (armija u spoljnoj politici Titove Jugoslavije 1945—1958), Belgrade 2005
- Jugoslovenska armija 1945—1954 (nova ideologija, čovek, oružje), Belgrade, 2006
- Jugoslovensko ratno vazduhoplovstvo 1942—1992, Belgrade, 2006
- Golgota četnika (Lijevče polje, Jasenovac, Zidani Most), Belgrade, 2019
- 2. krajiški korpus Vojske Republike Srpske, Dušan Kukobat and Bojan Dimitrijević, Banja Luka, 2019
- General Mladić i Vojska Republike Srpske, Catena mundi, Belgrade, 2025
