= Institute of Contemporary History, Belgrade =

Research institute based in Belgrade, Serbia

Institute of Contemporary History Институт за савремену историју
- Founders: Assembly of Yugoslavia & Federal Executive Council
- Established: 1969; 56 years ago
- Focus: humanities, history
- Address: Trg Nikole Pašića 11
- Location: Belgrade, Serbia
- Website: isi.ac.rs

The Institute of Contemporary History (Serbo-Croatian: Институт за савремену историју, Institut za savremenu istoriju) is a research institute based in Belgrade, Serbia. The institution was originally established as a federal Yugoslav body when in 1969 the Department of Historical Sciences of the Institute for Social Sciences and the Department for History of the Yugoslav Workers’ Movement were merged into a single institute.

== History ==
The institute's origins trace back to 1958 when it was established as part of the Institute of Social Sciences' Department of Historical Sciences. It gained its current form in 1967/68 following a merger with the First Department of the Institute for the Study of the Workers' Movement. Officially registered with the District Commercial Court on January 31, 1969, the ISI has maintained its name, scope of work, and headquarters since its inception.

Initially founded as a federal Yugoslav institution, ISI became a Serbian republic-level scientific organization in 1977 following a decision by the Assembly of the Socialist Republic of Serbia. While its jurisdiction changed, the institute retained its focus on Yugoslav history and broader regional studies. By the 1980s, the institute had grown to include over 50 staff members, including researchers, librarians, and technical personnel. However, the 1990s brought challenges, leading to a reduced staff. By 2009, the institute stabilized with 25 employees, including seven scientific advisors. The institute celebrated its 50th anniversary in 2009. In September 2019 institute signed the cooperation agreement with the Serb National Council.
