= Dragutin Keserović =

Yugoslav Chetnik leader (1896–1945)

Vojvoda Dragutin Keserović
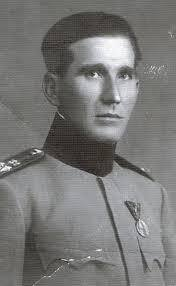
- Born: 21 November 1896; Piroman, Obrenovac, Serbia
- Died: 17 August 1945 (aged 48); Belgrade, Yugoslavia
- Cause of death: Execution by firing squad
- Burial place: Unknown
- Military career
- Allegiance: Kingdom of Serbia; Kingdom of Yugoslavia; Chetniks
- Branch: Army
- Service years: 1912–1945
- Rank: Lieutenant Colonel
- Nicknames: Keser, Orel
- Units: Rasina Corps (Mountain Detachment #23); Rasina-Toplica Corps Group (since 11 May 1944)
- Conflicts: World War I; Macedonian front; World War II; Attack on Kruševac; Chetnik sabotage of Axis communication lines; Operation Kopaonik; Operation Trumpf; Liberation of Kruševac
- Awards: Order of the Star of Karađorđe

Dragutin Keserović (Serbian Cyrillic: Драгутин Кесеровић; 21 November 1896 – 17 August 1945) was a Yugoslav Chetnik military commander holding the rank of lieutenant colonel and vojvoda during World War II. Keserović was likely the most active commander of Mihailović's Chetniks in Serbia.

== Biography ==
=== 1941 ===
Immediately after the Axis invasion of Yugoslavia in April 1941, then-Major Keserović joined the Pećanac Chetniks under the command of Kosta Pećanac, a World War I voivode. In August, Pećanac concluded a collaborationist agreement with the Germans.Keserović then transferred to Draža Mihailović's Chetniks

Representatives of the Chetniks held meetings with representatives of the communist Partisan forces in the village of Bovan and made a plan to attack Kruševac. According to this plan, it was agreed that the date of the attack would be 23 September 1941, that Kruševac would be blocked before the attack, that Keserović and his Chetniks would attack the town from the west and south across Bagdala,and that the communists would attack from the north and east.

According to post-war Yugoslav sources, the Partisan Rasina detachment and the Chetniks' commander Keserović agreed to attack Kruševac together, on 23 September 1941. On 24 September, Keserović's Chetnik detachment attacked German troops in the Kruševac district, killing 23 soldiers. The fighting between attacking rebels and the Axis garrison had lasted for four days when Kosta Pećanac personally, with a large force of his Black Chetniks, came to release the Axis garrison. Post-war Yugoslav sources blamed Keserović for the failure of the attack on Kruševac. These sources accuse Keserović of attacking the German garrison earlier than agreed and of halting the attack when Partisan communist forces joined the attack. At the end of September, Keserović and Radojević published a printed flyer against Kosta Pećanac and signed it People's Liberation Movement of Chetniks and Partisans (Serbian: Народноослободилачка војска четника и партизана). Pećanac sentenced Keserović and Radojević to death.

=== 1942 ===
According to some sources, Keserović protected a group of Jewish refugees hosted at the beginning of 1942 in the village of Dankoviće on Kopaonik. On 1 February 1942, the non-legalized Chetniks commanded by Keserović captured Aleksandrovac and disarmed some members of local Chetnik garrison which was legalized with Serbian puppet government. The remaining members of local garrison joined Keserović whose forces were chased by multiple detachments of legalized Chetniks until the end of February.

Initially, the headquarters of Keserović's forces was in the village of Kupci, between Kruševac and Brus, and later in the village of Kriva Reka, Brus, on Kopaonik. In August 1942, Mihailović issued his first orders that took a "definite position against the occupying powers". These orders were British-inspired and included orders to prepare to sabotage the railways in occupied Serbia. After these orders, Keserović issued a general direction urging peasants in his area of operations to hide grain, livestock, and fodder from the occupying forces. In August 1942, the joint Axis forces of German and Bulgarian troops attacked Major Keserović's Chetniks on Kopaonik and captured nine members of his headquarters; three of them were members of the British mission and were executed when they were leaving the village of Kriva Reka. In 1942, he maintained communication with Nikolaj Velimirović. Shortly before Italian capitulation in September 1943, Keserović raided two German railway transports and pushed back German attacks to Mihailović's headquarters.

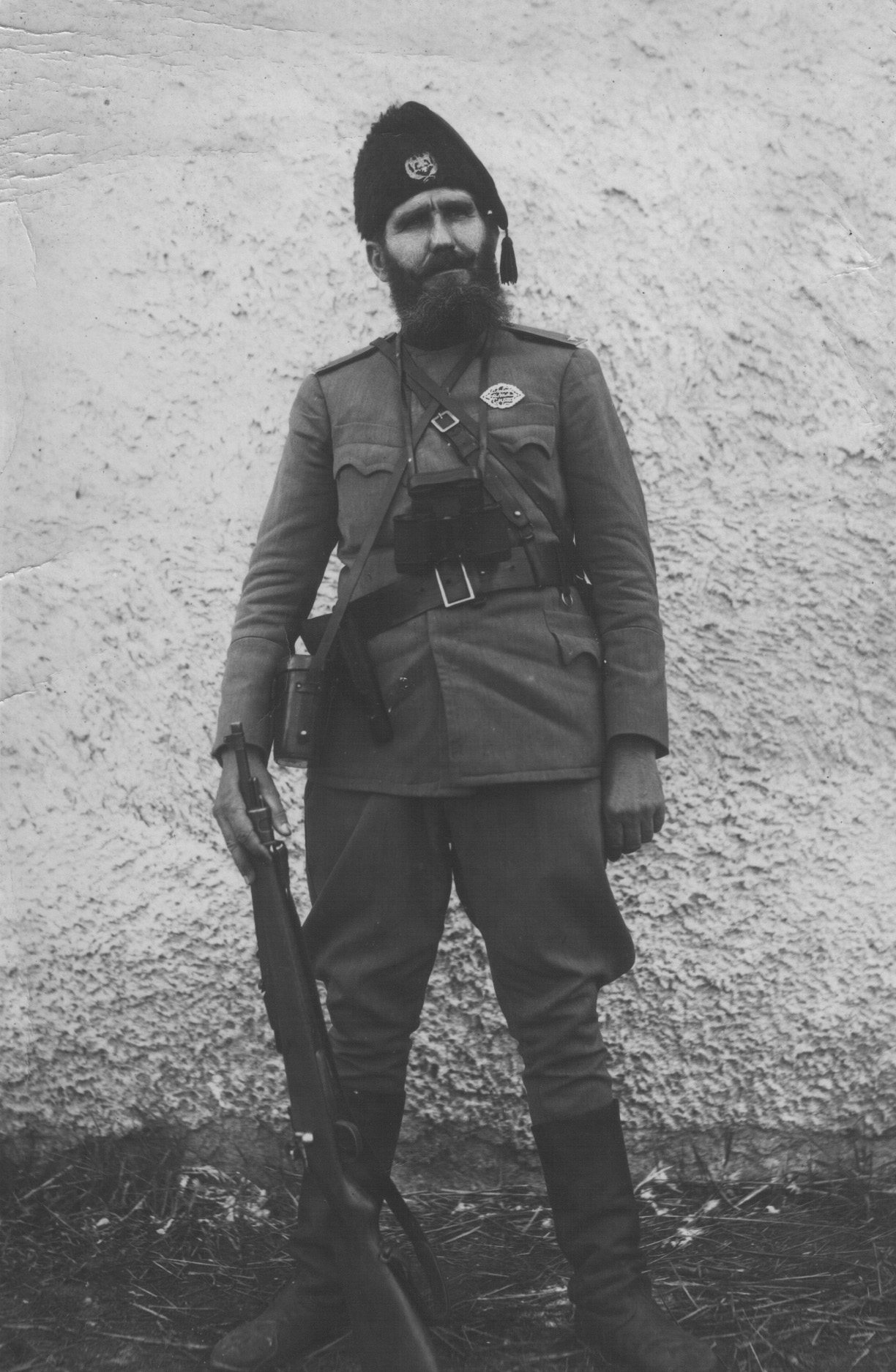
Dragutin Keserović in December 1942

From 11 to 14 October 1942, the Military Commander in Serbia launched a large-scale Axis offensive against Mihailović's Chetniks under command of Keserović in the region around Kriva Reka on Kopaonik mountain. The operation was a punitive expedition aimed against Mihailović's Chetniks, the chief target of German commanders who wanted to secure control of Serbia before important battles in North Africa.

Operation Kopaonik was part of a larger plan of the Axis forces to disarm Chetnik units. The Military Commander in Serbia prepared a list of 24 Chetnik officers to be arrested by the 7th SS Volunteer Mountain Division Prinz Eugen, one of them being Keserović. Keserović was probably the most active commander of Mihailović's Chetniks in Serbia. This operation was the first large-scale engagement of the 7th SS Volunteer Mountain Division Prinz Eugen under command of Artur Phleps, who personally commanded the Axis forces during Operation Kopaonik. The SS division had three regiments: two infantry and one artillery regiment. The German forces were also supported by several Bulgarian battalions of 1,000 men, and 300 men from the Russian Protective Corps. Keserović was informed about the attack and successfully retreated units of his detachment.

=== 1943 ===
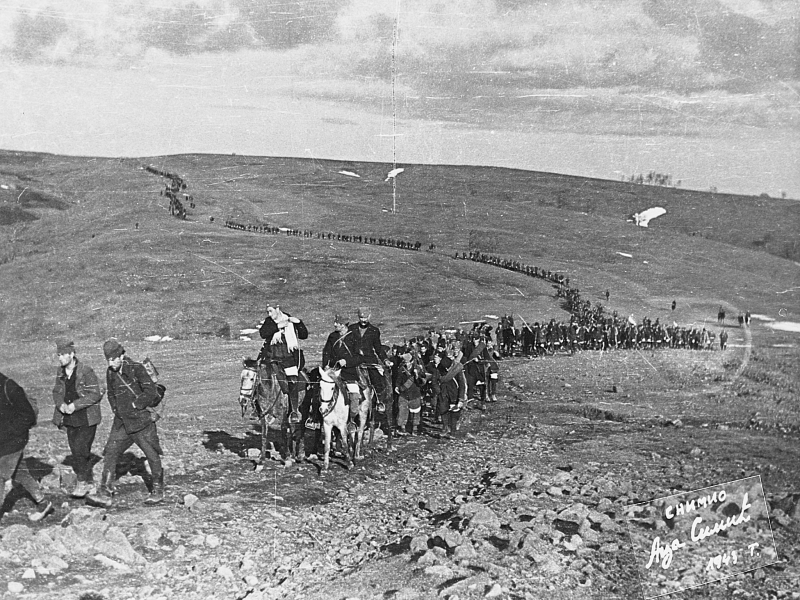
Two Corps of Chetniks from Serbia, one led by Keserović, during forced march over Pešter at the beginning of May 1943, rushing to protect Chetnik HQ attacked by communists on Jadovnik

In January 1943, Axis forces launched Case White, a combined strategic offensive aimed at destroying the Yugoslav Partisan resistance in the neighboring Independent State of Croatia. Two corps of Chetniks were sent from occupied Serbia to support Chetnik formations that had participated on the Axis side in the offensive and had been defeated by the Partisans following the latter's crossing of the Neretva River. These corps were led by Keserović and Predrag Raković and totaled 2,000 men. By early May 1943, Mihailović became aware of the German intention to capture him and decided to return to German-occupied Serbia. Based on his orders, the two corps of Chetniks led by Keserović and Predrag Raković came from German-occupied Serbia to the area of Bijelo Polje in the Italian governorate of Montenegro to escort him back to Serbia.

In 1943, the British sub-mission was established in Keserović's headquarters. According to Chetnik officer Milan Deroc, the name of the British Liaison Officer (BLO) at Keserović's headquarters was Major Bob Wade. By mid-1943, the differences between the British and the Chetniks had become "too serious and too pervasive". Almost without exception, the British reports were unfavorable to the Chetniks as a fighting force. The Chetniks too were unhappy with the British. Keserović issued directives to a brigade under his control to keep information from a British liaison officer visiting his area of operations, and to provide no information to him about the actual situation, but to provide only a positive perspective on the Chetniks, and to discount the Partisans as a resistance force in occupied Serbia.

Chetnik had clashed with Serbian Volunteer Corps in Kruševac region during 1943. As an retaliation for killing around 10 Chetniks in a region, Keserović's men killed 15 members of Serbian Volunteer Corps and 5 members of local quisling administration on July 28, 1943.

According to the German Foreign Office representative for the Balkans, Hermann Neubacher, Keserović concluded a formal "armistice agreement" with the Germans in his area of operations in the German-occupied territory of Serbia in late 1943. Such agreements were negotiated by at least four other senior Chetnik commanders in the occupied territory at this time. These agreements ensured that the Chetniks in these areas were safe from the Germans while they continued to fight the Partisans, provided with limited ammunition by the Germans, provided with medical assistance, including having their wounded treated in German hospitals, allowed freedom of movement, and allowed to forcibly recruit manpower in their areas of responsibility. These agreements also required the affected Chetniks to cease operations against the collaborationist puppet regime in the occupied territory, and effectively neutralized these Chetniks as far as the Germans were concerned. On 30 November 1943, Keserović reported to Mihailović that the Germans had offered him cooperation, arms, and ammunition, which he allegedly refused. He denied having any connection with the Germans.

=== 1944 ===
One of the elite Chetnik military units which would bear the biggest burden of defense from Tito's advancing communist forces was the Rasina-Toplica Corps Group, commanded by Keserović. This unit was established on 11 May 1944 by the Chetnik Supreme Command.

Number of deserters in Keserović's troops was large, so Keserović issued an ordered on in June saying soldiers who don't put enough effort should be brought to military court and those who desert should be executed on the spot. In July, the Germans initiated Operation Trumpf against the Partisans in the southern parts of German-occupied Serbia. This was a combined operation with Bulgarian troops, Serbian quisling formations, and Chetnik forces commanded by Radoslav Račić. Račić's Fourth Group of Shock Corps from western Serbia were reinforced by the Rasina-Kopaonik Group of Shock Corps commanded by Keserović. The total Chetnik forces involved in this operation exceeded 10,000 men (arguably the largest concentration of Chetnik troops in Serbia during the whole period of war), and the Chetniks were supplied with ammunition and some arms by the Germans.

On August 10 in a report of Army Group F it says that Chetnik group Keserović(Rasina-Toplica Corps Group) has voluntarily put itself under command of group Diesner. In late August 1944, a US Office of Strategic Services mission led by Colonel Robert H. McDowell was parachuted into a Chetnik-controlled area of occupied Serbia to join Mihailović's headquarters, gather general intelligence and establish contacts with representatives of pro-Western forces in Hungary, Bulgaria, and Romania. One member of the mission was Lieutenant Ellsworth Kramer. Kramer was quickly detached to Keserović. Since the situation of the Chetniks seriously deteriorated soon after the mission's arrival, most of McDowell's time was dedicated to the problems faced by the Chetniks, and little if any contact with potential allies in neighboring countries was undertaken.

On 1 September 1944, Keserović proclaimed general mobilization. In October 1944, when the Red Army entered occupied Serbia from Bulgaria, some of Keserović's troops met them and briefly occupied the town of Kruševac in central Serbia alongside them. However, within days, the Soviet troops disengaged from the Chetniks and demanded they disarm, threatening to use force if they did not. Keserović reported this to Mihailović on 19 October and refused the ultimatum, withdrawing towards the Ibar River valley with a small detachment of about 500 men. Two of his brigades were disarmed by the Red Army. Those taken into custody included Kramer, who was subsequently released. Keserović himself barely escaped being captured and turned over to the Partisans. On September 21 Keserović's Chetniks, along with local unit of Serbian State Guard and German artillery and aviation, inflicted biggest defeat to Partisans in fight for Serbia during 1944 between villages Velika Drenova and Parcane in Kruševac region. Partisan forces contained 3 battalions of 4th Montenegrin Brigade and 1 battalion of 3rd Serbian brigade, and were outnumbered 3 to 4 times by enemies. Partisan had 120 killed, 60 captured and "around 20 wagons of injured", whereas opposition forces had only 6 death and 14 wounded. Fate of captured partisans is unknown. During night 14–15 October 4th Montenegrin brigade attacked Keserović's Chetniks that were retreating from Kruševac. At least 41 Chetniks died during attack and tens more were captured by Partisans.

During the attack by Chetniks on Axis forces in Tuzla in December 1944, Keserović commanded the right column of the Chetnik forces, while the left column was commanded by Mihailović. In late 1944, Keserović released a captured member of the enemy forces whose name was Alija Izetbegović (who would in 1996 became the first President of Bosnia and Herzegovina), based on intervention by a group of Serbs who informed him that Izetbegović's grandfather had saved the lives of 40 Serbs in 1914 during the anti-Serb pogrom that followed the Assassination of Archduke Franz Ferdinand.

=== Terror tactics against Partisans and their supporters ===
In his area of responsibility in occupied Serbia, Keserović used terror tactics against Partisans, their families, and sympathizers, drawing up lists of people and ordering them to be killed. To carry out these killings, special units known as "black trojkas" were trained and deployed, often using knives to kill their victims. Orders for anti-partisan terror came directly from Draža Mihailović. According to Vojislav Janković, judge from Kruševac, Keserović and chief of Kruševac branch of Special Police made a list of over 150 people from Kruševac to be executed on 13 October 1944, however this massacre was prevented because of Red Army's liberation of the city.

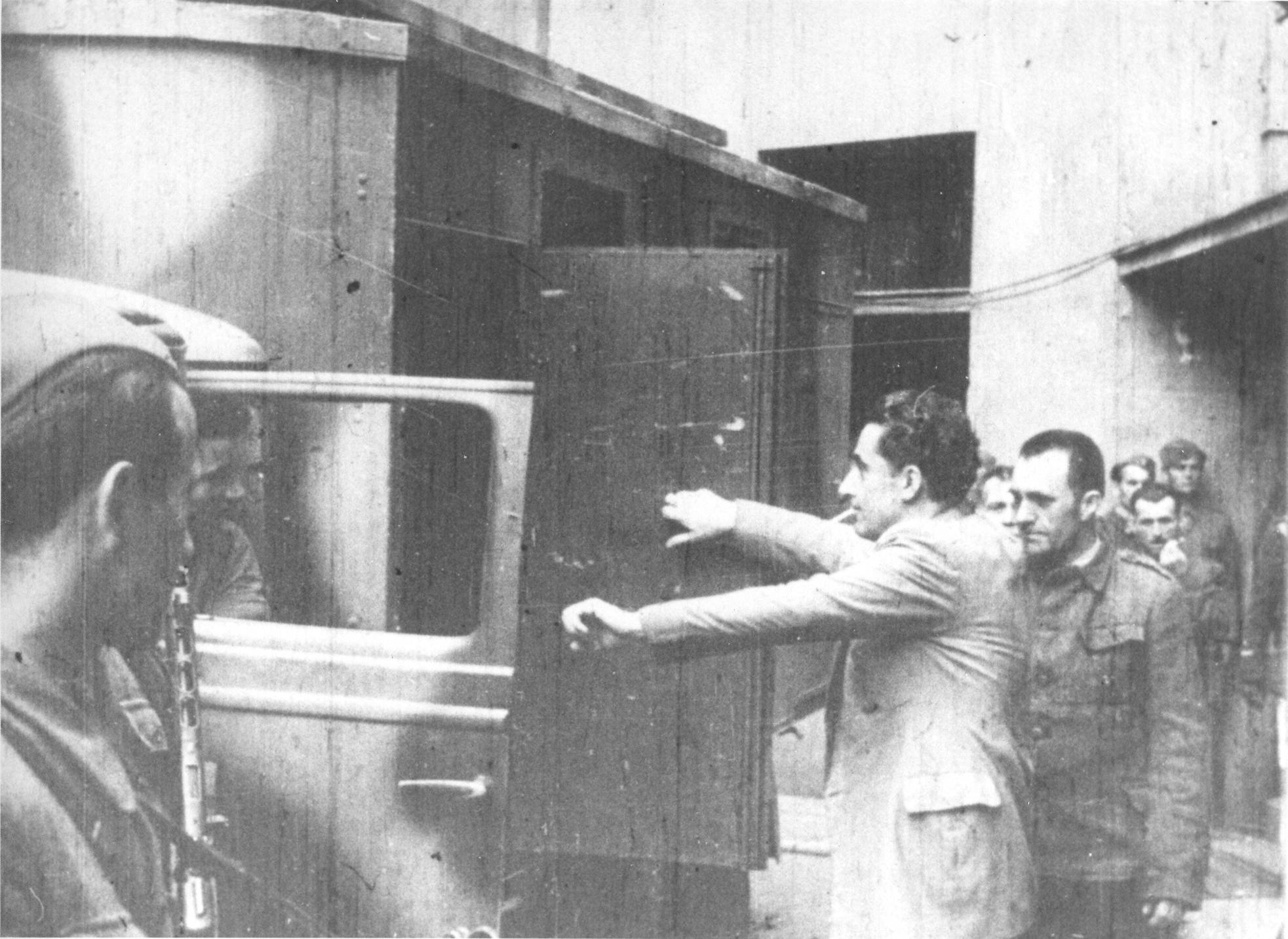
Keserović is taken away after his trial, August 1945

=== 1945 ===
During January Yugoslav People's Army estimates that number of Chetniks remaining under Keserović's command in Eastern Bosnia is around 1300 (out of 3900 Chetniks estimated to be present in the region). During early March joint Chetnik troops of Keserović, Nikola Kalabić and Dragoslav Račić fought with Yugoslav Army around Gradačac, which Army estimates to be around 2000 men. Keserović's troops were part of main Chetnik column that went towards Zelengora on May 10–11, following Mihailović decision to return to Serbia, because advance towards Slovenia was impossible. Yugoslav Army defeated main Chetnik column in Battle of Zelengora, however Keserović was among few hundred Chetniks who avoided death or capture at Zelengora.

=== Capture, trial, and death ===
Keserović was captured by the Partisans and placed on trial. During the trial, he blamed the Chetnik Supreme Command for most of the actions he was charged with and asserted that he was just carrying out orders. The claim that Keserović denounced Mihailović as collaborator and had broken with him was untrue. The court passed a verdict by which it sentenced Colonel Keserović to death by firing squad, loss of all civil rights and confiscation of all property for crimes against the people and the state, for aiding the occupier, for cooperation with the government of Milan Nedić and for hostile activities against the new state aimed at subversion of the new constitutional order, peace and security. Colonel Keserović was shot on August 17, 1945, somewhere in Belgrade, with the precise site of the execution not being revealed.

== Awards and recognitions ==
- Order of the Star of Karađorđe

== Sources ==
- Ailsby, Christopher (June 2004). Hitler's renegades: foreign nationals in the service of the Third Reich. Spellmount. ISBN 9781862272477.
- Deroc, Milan (1997). By the Pen, the Sword, and Dagger: Biography of Captain Derok, a Leader of the 1941 Uprising in German Occupied Serbia. Ed. Marie-Renée Morin.
- Dimitrijević, Bojan B. (2020). Vojska Nedićeve Srbije oružane snage srpske vlade 1941-1945 (3 ed.). Službeni glasnik. ISBN 978-86-519-1811-0.
- Dimitrijevic, Vladimir (2007). Оклеветани светац: Владика Николај и србофобија [The Slandered Saint: Bishop Nikolai and Serbophobia]. ЛИО. ISBN 978-86-83697-40-3.
- Dimitrijević, Bojan; Nikolić, Kosta (2004). Đeneral Mihailović: biografija. Институт за савремену историју (Belgrade, Serbia). ISBN 9788674030950.
- Djordjević, Dimitrije (1997). Scars and Memory: Four Lives in One Lifetime. East European Monographs. ISBN 978-0-88033-368-9.
- Džomić, Velibor V. (2009). Србска црква, Љотић и љотићевци [Ljotić and the Serbian Church]. Štampar "Makarije". ISBN 9788687019485.
- Glišić, Venceslav; Borković, Milan (1975). Komunistička partija Jugoslavije u Srbiji 1941-1945: 1941-1942. Rad.
- Glišić, Venceslav (1970). Teror i zločini nacističke Nemačke u Srbiji 1941-1944. Rad.
- Izetbegović, Alija (2005). Alija Izetbegović - dostojanstvo ljudskog izbora. OKO. ISBN 978-9958-43-113-5.
- Karchmar, Lucien (1973). Draz̆a Mihailović and the Rise of the C̆etnik Movement, 1941-1942. Department of History, Stanford University.
- Kovbasko, Budimka (1971). Kriva reka: (kopaonička). Istorijski arhiv; Brue, Zajodnica kulture.
- Kumm, Otto (1978). Vorwärts, Prinz Eugen!: Geschichte d. 7. SS-Freiwilligen-Division "Prinz Eugen". Munin. ISBN 978-3-921242-34-6.
- Latas, Branko; Dželebdžić, Milovan (1979). Četnički pokret Draže Mihailovića 1941-1945. Beogradski izdavačko-grafički zavod.
- Milovanović, Nikola (1991). Draža Mihailović. Belgrade: Pegaz.
- Perović, Milivoje (1961). Južna Srbija. Nolit.
- Plećaš, Neđeljko; Dimitrijević, Bojan (2004). Институт за савремену историју (Belgrade, Serbia) (ed.). Ratne godine. Institut za savremenu istoriju. ISBN 9788674030912.
- Popović, Jovo (1986). Vješala za generale. Stvarnost. ISBN 9788670750548.
- Roberts, Walter R. (1987). Tito, Mihailović and the Allies: 1941–1945. New Brunswick, New Jersey: Duke University Press. ISBN 978-0-8223-0773-0.
- Tomasevich, Jozo (1975). War and Revolution in Yugoslavia, 1941–1945: The Chetniks. Stanford: Stanford University Press. ISBN 978-0-8047-0857-9.
- Williams, Heather (2003). Parachutes, Patriots and Partisans: The Special Operations Executive and Yugoslavia, 1941-1945. C. Hurst & Co. Publishers. ISBN 978-1-85065-592-3.
- Ford, Kirk (1992). OSS and the Yugoslav resistance, 1943-1945. Texas A&M University Press. ISBN 978-0-89096-517-7.
- Radanović, Milan (2016). Kazna i zločin:Snage kolaboracije u Srbiji. Belgrade: Rosa Luxemburg Stiftung.
