= Church of the Holy Apostles Peter and Paul, Kriva Reka =

Parish church of Kriva Reka, Brus

Coordinates: 43°22′46″N 20°53′05″E

Church of the Holy Apostles Peter and Paul
- Црква Светих Апостола Петра и Павла
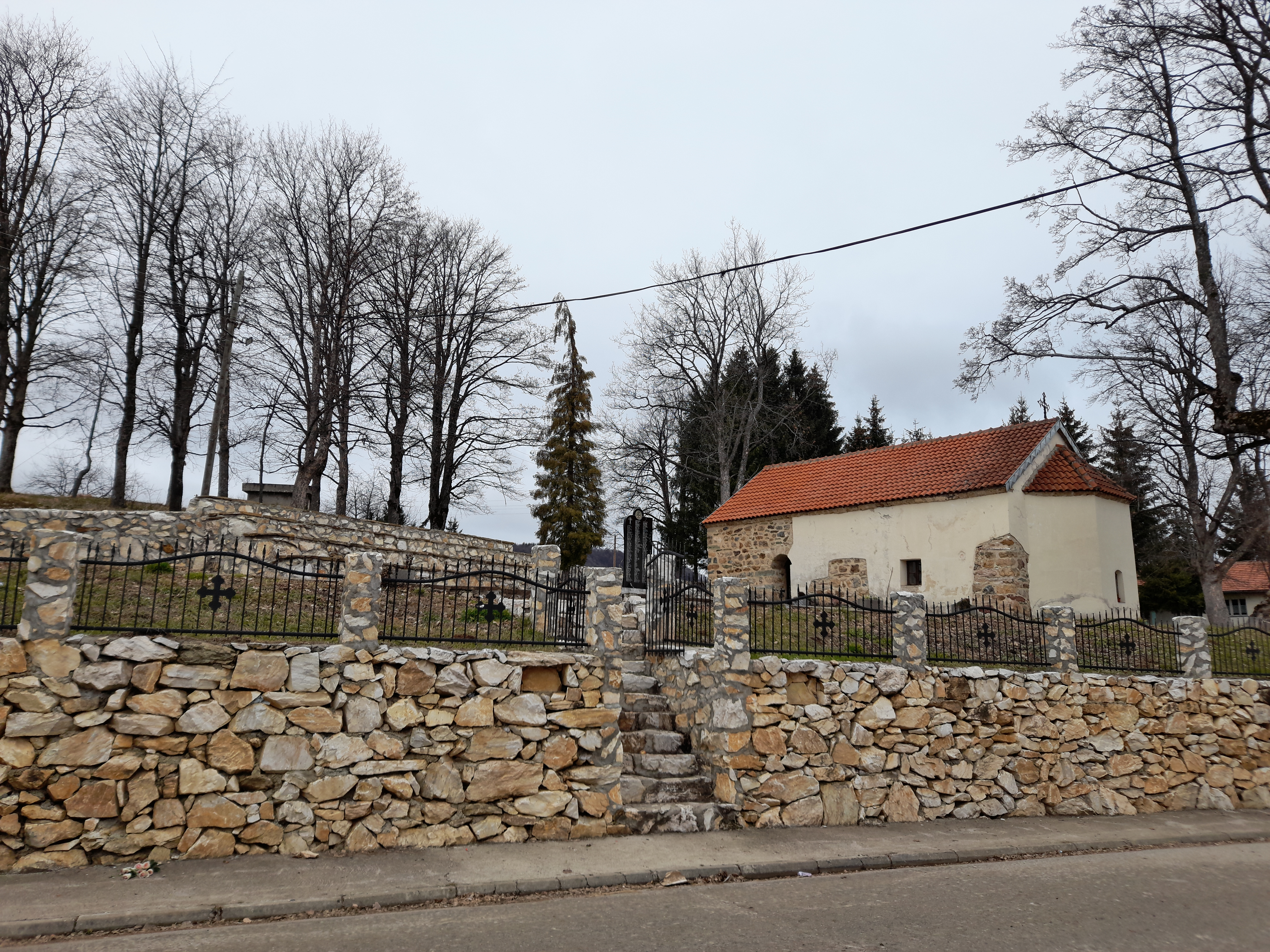
- The church as seen from the street
- Church of the Holy; Apostles Peter and Paul
- Address: 12 October Street, Kriva Reka, Brus
- Country: Serbia
- Language(s): Church Slavonic; Serbian
- Denomination: Serbian Orthodox Church

Architecture
- Functional status: Active
- Completed: 1618

Administration
- Diocese: Eparchy of Raška and Prizren

The Church of the Holy Apostles Peter and Paul (Serbian: Црква Светих Апостола Петра и Павла, romanized: Crkva Svetih Apostola Petra i Pavla) is a Serbian Orthodox church of the Eparchy of Raška and Prizren located in the village of Kriva Reka, Brus, in the Republic of Serbia. It was built in 1618 in an architectural style typical of churches built during the Ottoman rule of Serbia. It has the foundation of a single-nave church with a narthex and lacks a proper iconostasis. The church's frescoes, which are now in poor condition, was created in 1621. Connected to the church is the village's primary cemetery.

== History ==
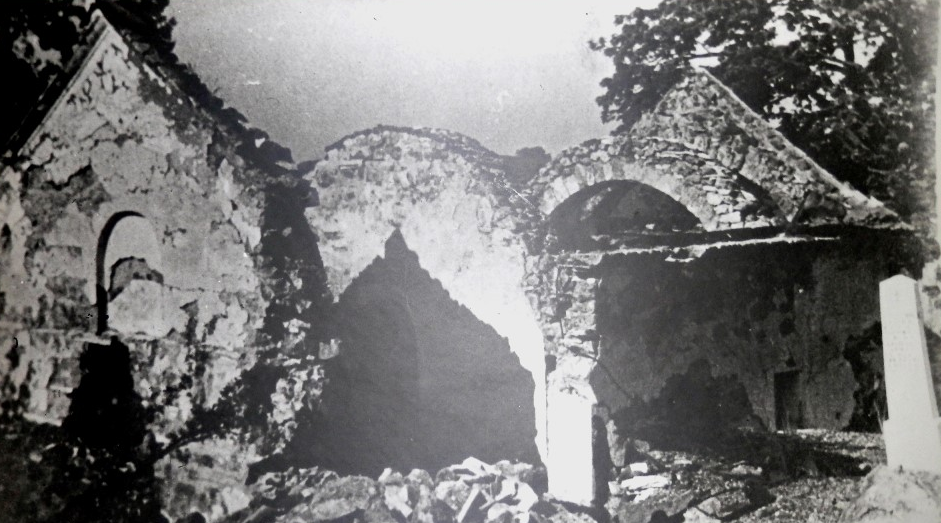
The church after the massacre of civilians inside and explosion

In 1942, during the Second World War, as part of Operation Kopaonik, members of the 7th SS Volunteer Mountain Division Prinz Eugen and Bulgarian soldiers, against the commands of Richard Kaaserer, imprisoned 46 men, women and children in the church on 12 October 1942. The troops subsequently shot the prisoners and put their bodies back inside, after which they blew the church up. The church was not completely destroyed, with most of the walls surviving, together with part of the frescoes. The church required some of its walls rebuilt with plaster, which contrasts its original cobblestone exterior.

On 25 June 1975 the church declared a cultural monument of great importance by the People's Government of Serbia. A tomb and a memorial with the list of the names of the executed victims during the punitive expedition in 1942 are listed along with the church.

Work on the conservation of the frescoes was carried out in 1975 and 1976. In 2017, work was undertaken to develop the church square into a memorial park.

== Gallery ==
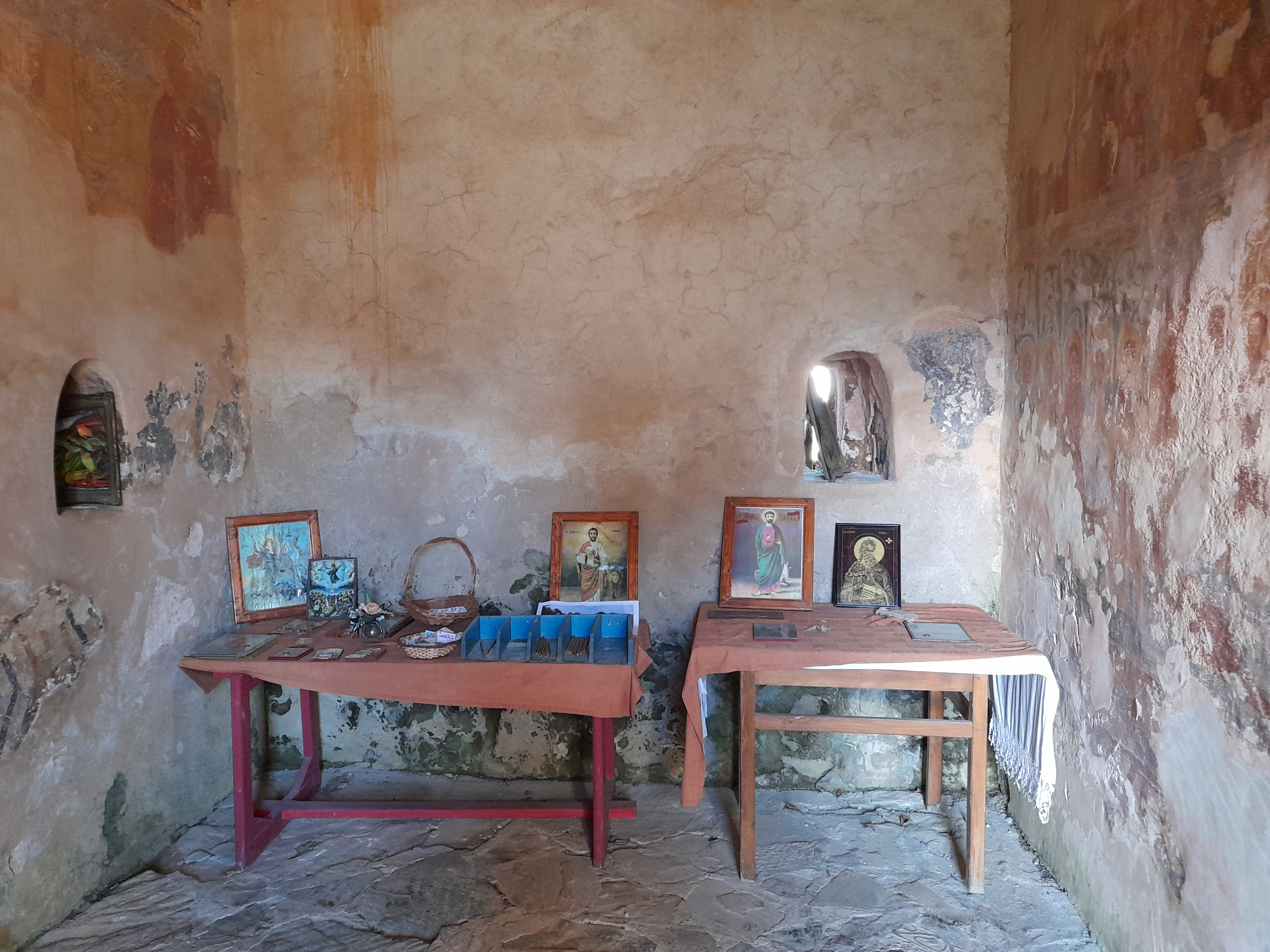
Narthex

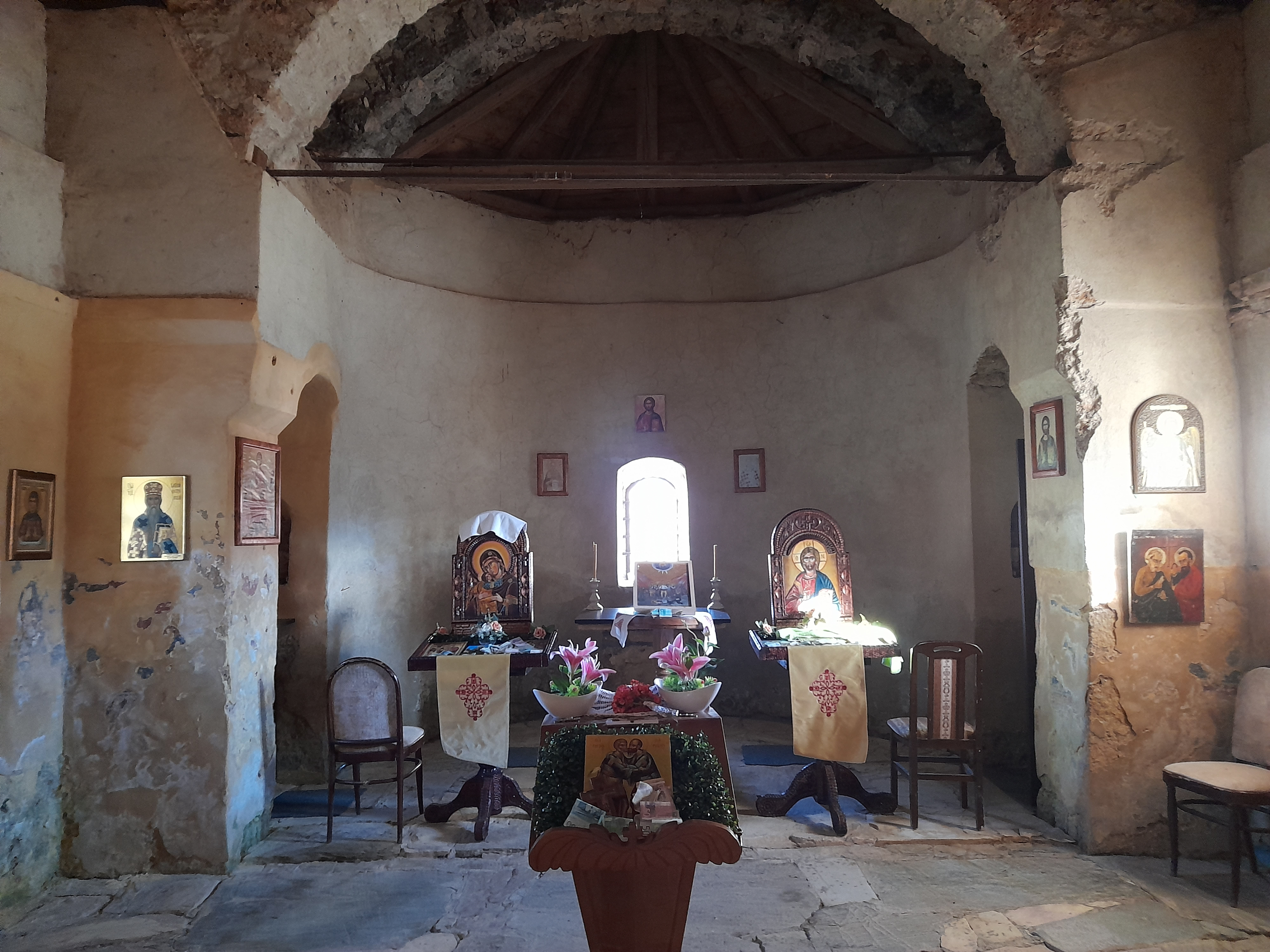
Chancel

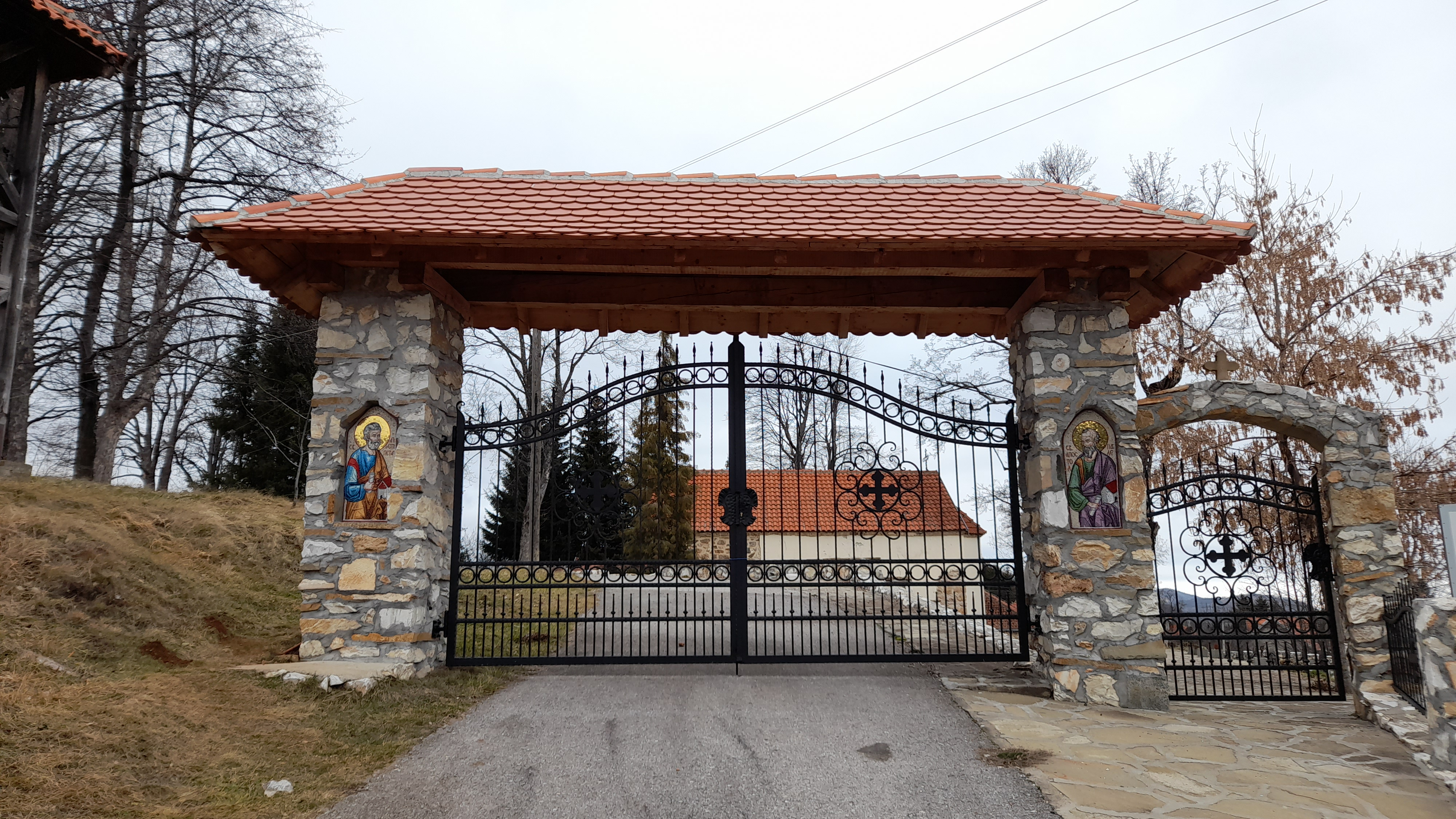
Gate

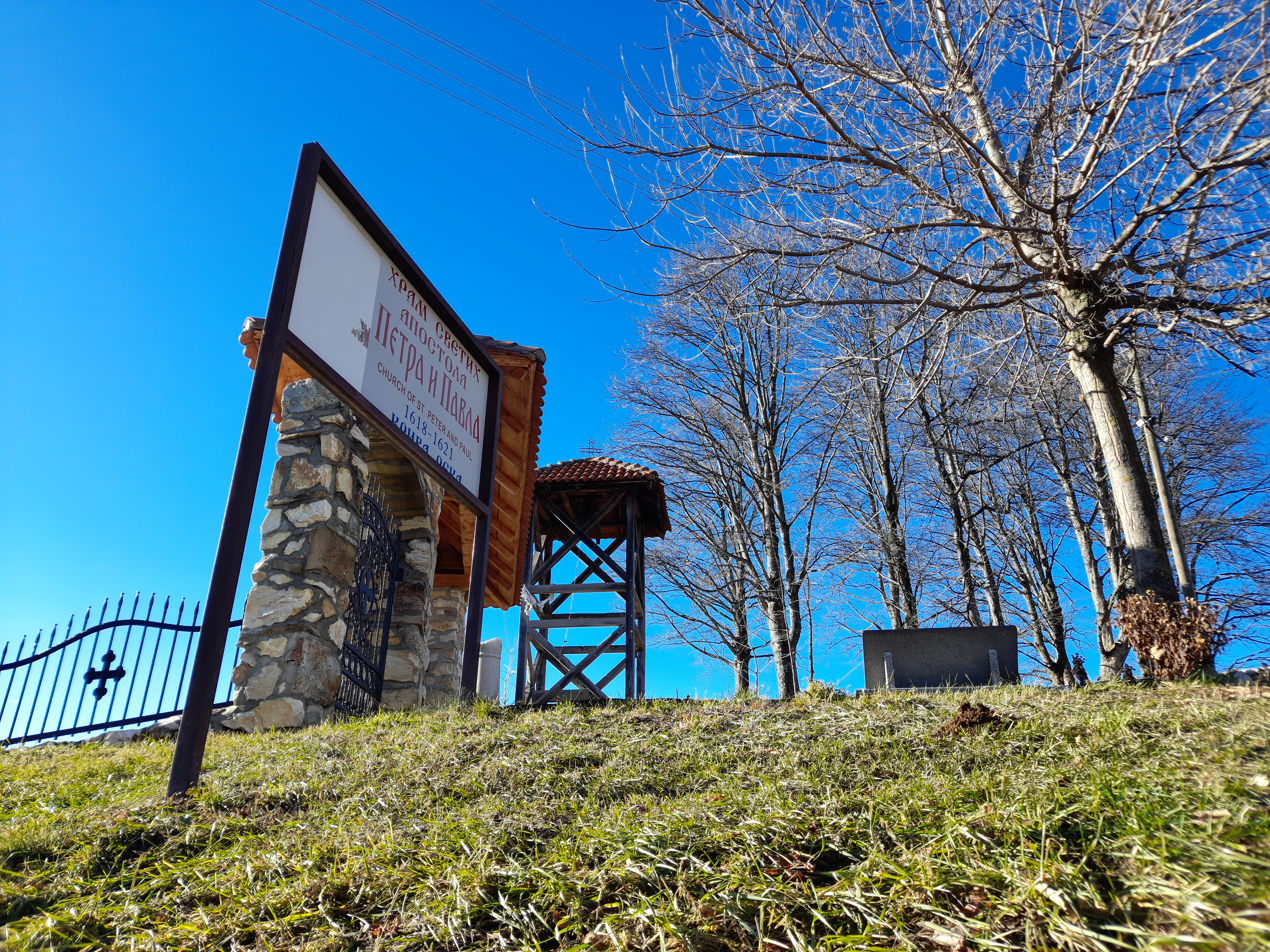
Welcome sign; the church's bell tower can be seen in the background

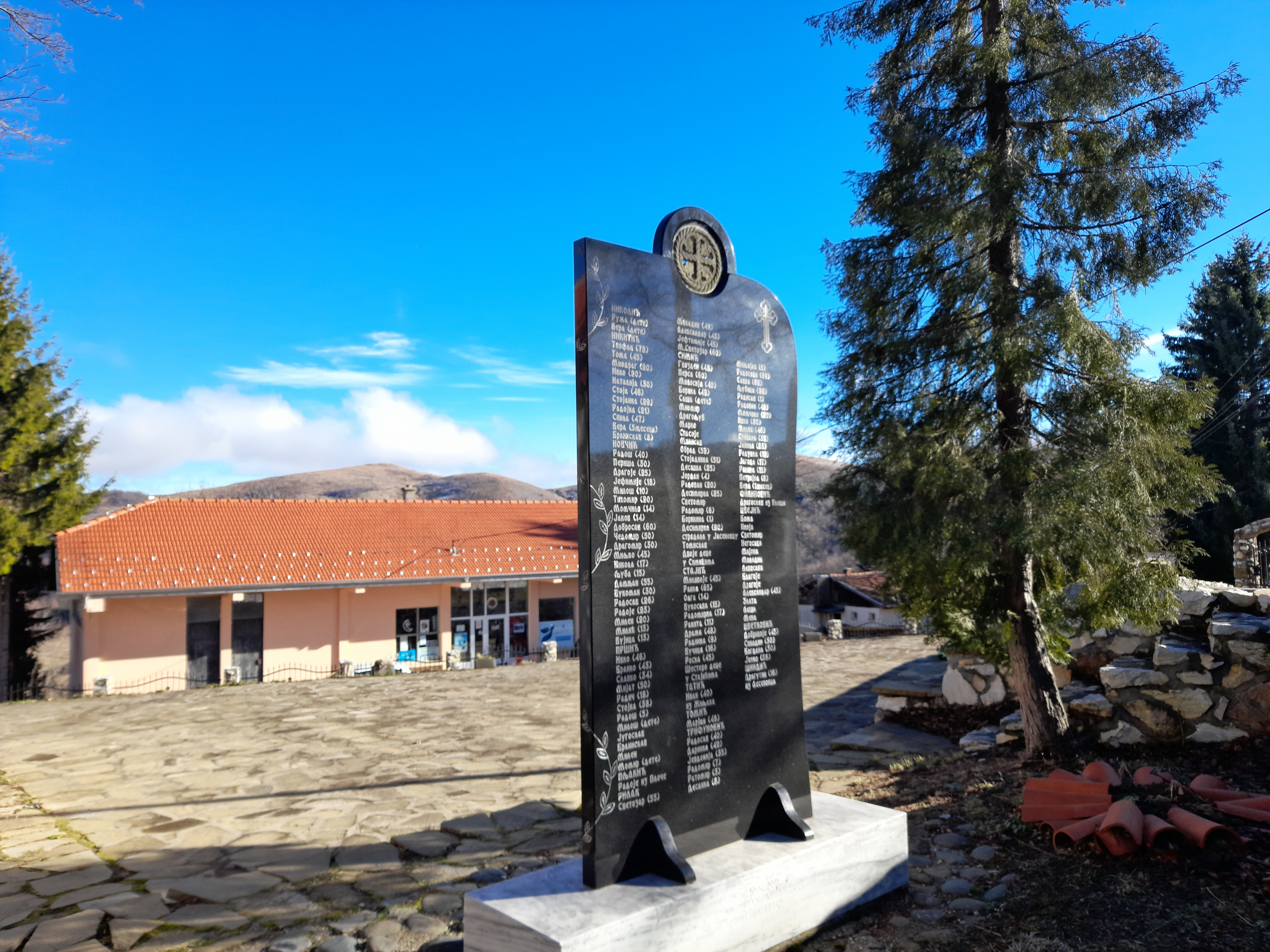
Memorial monument to the victims of the 1942 massacre by the Axis forces

== See also ==
- Immovable Cultural Heritage in the Rasina District

== Sources ==
- Basta, Milan (1986). Rat je završen 7 dana kasnije. OOUR.
- Popović, Jovo (1986). Vješala za generale. Stvarnost. ISBN 9788670750548.
