= Rasina Corps =

Yugoslav army corps during World War II

- Расински Корпус
- Country: Kingdom of Yugoslavia
- Allegiance: Chetniks
- Branch: army
- Role: anti-fascist and anti-communist struggle
- Size: 3,000
- Engagements: World War II in Yugoslavia: Battle of Kruševac (1941); Chetnik sabotage of Axis communication lines; Operation Kopaonik; Battle of Kruševac (1944)

Commanders
- Current commander: Dragutin Keserović

The Rasina Corps was a corps of the Yugoslav Army in the Homeland (JVuO) that operated in the region of Kruševac county of Axis occupied Kingdom of Yugoslavia (modern-day Serbia) under command of Dragutin Keserović.

== History ==
On 11 May 1944 the Rasina Corps was merged with Toplica Corps to establish Rasina-Toplica Corps Group, an elite Chetnik unit that would receive the biggest burden of defence from Tito's communist forces and together with the Red Army liberated Kruševac from Axis occupation.

Rasina Corps evolved from Rasina Detachment. According to postwar Communist sources Rasina Corps had 3,000 soldiers. Its zone of activity was territory of former Kruševac county. It had five brigades:

- 1st Trstenik Brigade
- 2nd Trstenik Brigade
- Studenica Brigade
- Kruševac Brigade
- Župa Brigade

Initially, the headquarters was in Kupci village between Kruševac and Brus, and later in Kriva Reka village on Kopaonik. The Rasina Corps had a military court and published journals including Freedom or Death (Serbian: Слобода или смрт) and Youth (Serbian: Омладинац).

A British mission was attached to HQ of the Rasina Corps. One of its members was Captain Robert Wade. Wade emphasized in his later testimonies that the Chetniks he contacted were convinced that the British would help them to win the war and had no indication that the British support to Chetniks would end. On 23 May 1943 another British mission joined Rasina Corps with airplane which, a mission headed by Major Neil Selby arrived to Rasina Corps after being parachuted to Kopaonik. When Selby arrived to HQ of Keserović, he took over the command of group of British officers led by Captain Wade who were already there. Selby arrived on Kopaonik together with Yugoslav officer Petar Fereštetski, while airplane which carried them also delivered 10 machine guns and 4,000 bullets to Chetniks.

On 24 December 1943 Mihailović ordered destruction of one railway bridge on Južna Morava river in the first half of January 1944 by Rasina and Deligrad Corps.

=== Rasina-Toplica Corps ===
Rasina-Toplica Corps Group commanded by Lt. Colonel Keserović took the biggest burden of defence from advancing Titos communist forces. This unit was established on 11 May 1944 by Chetnik Supreme Command. Together with Red Army, Rasina-Toplica Corps Group liberated Kruševac on 14 October 1944.

== Sources ==
- Latas, Branko; Dželebdžić, Milovan (1979). Četnički pokret Draže Mihailovića 1941-1945. Beogradski izdavačko-grafički zavod.
- Bailey, Roderick (2008). Forgotten Voices of the Secret War: An Inside History of Special Operations During the Second World War. Ebury Press. ISBN 978-0-09-191850-7.
- Ilić, Nikola P. (1972). Svestenstvo juzne Srbije i revoluciji, 1941-1945. Radnicki Univerzitet "K. Stamenkovic".
- Dimitrijević, Bojan; Nikolić, Kosta (2004). Đeneral Mihailović: biografija. Институт за савремену историју (Belgrade, Serbia). ISBN 9788674030950.
- Stanišić, Mihailo (2000). Projekti "Velika Srbija". Službeni list SRJ. ISBN 9788635504681.
- Stanišić, Mihailo (1999). Ekspanzionizam Hrvata i rastrojstvo Srba. Službeni list SRJ. ISBN 9788635504292.
