= Bovan =

Bovan may refer to:

- Bovan (Aleksinac), Serbia
- Bovan (Kruševac), Serbia
- Bolvan Fortress, also known as Bovan Fortress, Serbia
