= Ljubo Novaković =

Yugoslav military officer (1883–1943)

Brigadier General Ljubo Novaković
- Љубо Новаковић
- Born: 12 July 1883; Bijela Stijena, Principality of Montenegro
- Died: Late 1943 (aged c. 60); German occupied territory of Montenegro
- Relatives: Zaharije Ostojić (brother-in-law)
- Military career
- Allegiance: Principality of Montenegro (1902–1910); Kingdom of Montenegro (1910–1918); Yugoslavia (1918–1943); Chetniks (1941–1943)
- Service years: 1912–1943
- Rank: Brigadier general
- Conflicts: First Balkan War; Second Balkan War; World War I World War II

Ljubo Novaković (Serbian Cyrillic: Љубо Новаковић; 1883–1943) was a Montenegrin officer in the Royal Yugoslav Army who became a Chetnik commander during World War II. He initially fought for the Chetniks of Draža Mihailović and those of Kosta Pećanac, but became disillusioned with both movements. He went to eastern Bosnia in late 1941, and raised Chetnik bands to fight Yugoslav Partisans there. He was captured by the Partisans in January 1942 and taken to Foča, where he was kept under constant surveillance. Partisan leader Josip Broz Tito likely believed that Novaković could be used to counteract Mihailović's influence among Chetniks in eastern Bosnia. Novaković left Foča with a British mission in April 1942 and returned to Montenegro with the intention of reassembling the disorganized Chetnik formations there. He was killed in late 1943, either by the Partisans or Mihailović's Chetniks.

== Early and personal life ==
Ljubo Novaković was born in the village of Bijela Stijena, near Plužine, on 12 July 1883. His first marriage was to Ružica Dražić, with whom he had a son named Jakša, who went on to become a major in the Royal Yugoslav Army. His second wife was the sister of Major Zaharije Ostojić, an officer in the Royal Yugoslav Air Force.

== Military career ==
=== Balkan Wars, World War I and interwar period ===
Novaković was a member of the Royal Montenegrin Army during the Balkan Wars of 1912–1913. He also fought on the Montenegrin side during World War I, but was captured by the Austro-Hungarian Army in 1916 and detained as a prisoner of war until the conflict's end. In 1919, he joined the newly formed army of the Kingdom of Serbs, Croats and Slovenes (renamed Yugoslavia in 1929), and received the rank of captain. In early 1935, he helped the reverend Momčilo Đujić establish a Chetnik band near the town of Knin.

=== World War II ===
==== Activities in occupied Serbia ====
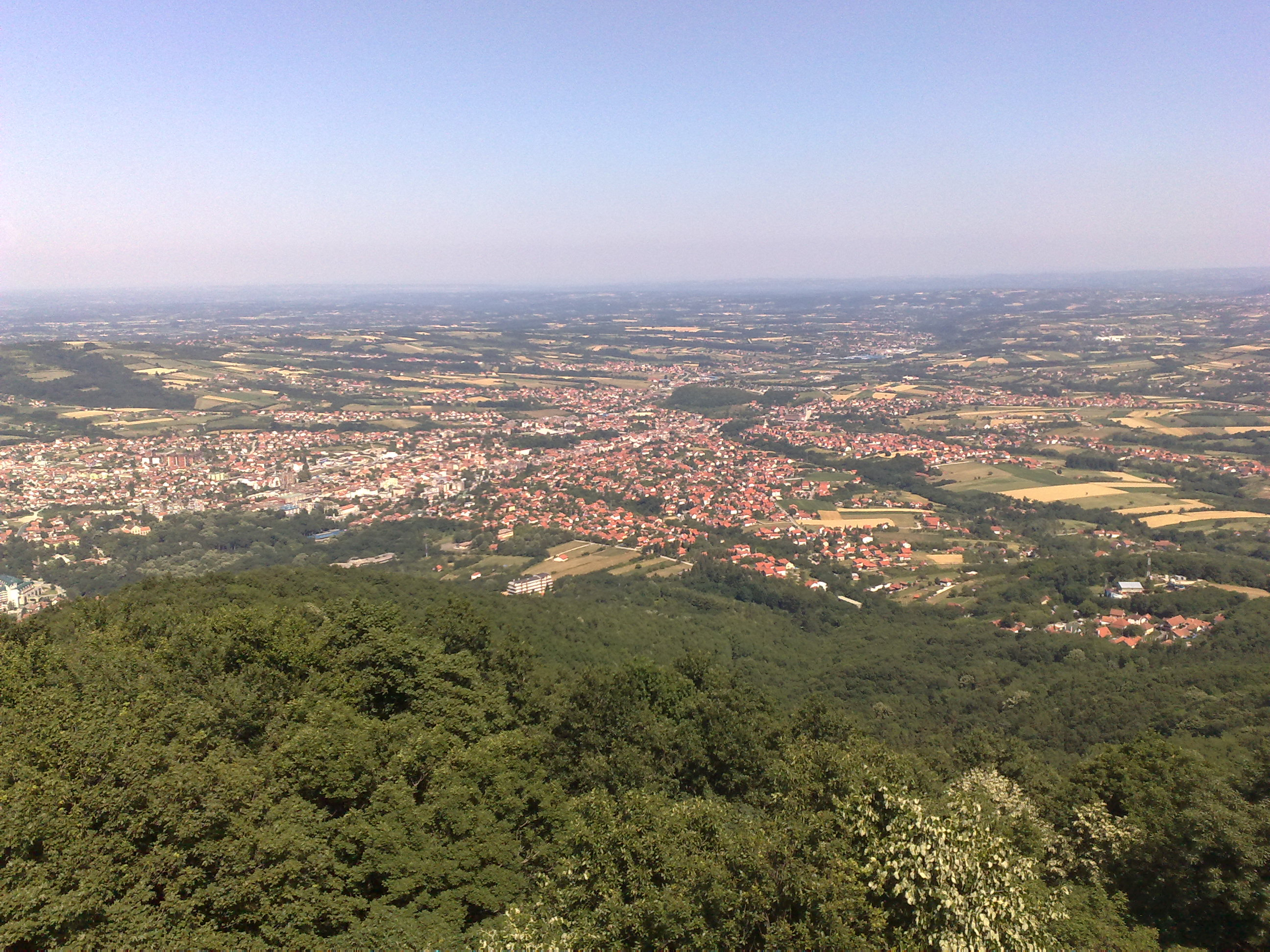
Novaković launched an unsuccessful uprising in Aranđelovac in September 1941

An artillery officer, Novaković held the rank of brigadier general during the Axis invasion of Yugoslavia in April 1941. He led the 3rd Army's Komski Cavalry Detachment, which consisted of the 48th Infantry Regiment and a mountain artillery division. Between 7 and 12 April, his forces engaged the Royal Italian Army on the Yugoslav–Albanian border near the town of Gusinje. Following the collapse of Yugoslavia, Novaković was captured by the Germans and detained inside a military hospital in Valjevo.

Novaković was smuggled out of the Valjevo hospital by Chetnik sympathizers in late May 1941. He then went to Ravna Gora, and arrived at the headquarters of Chetnik leader Draža Mihailović in June. Mihailović and his advisors were deeply suspicious of Novaković because of his high military rank and worried that he might wish to usurp Mihailović as commander of the Chetniks. When Novaković suggested that the Chetniks establish three separate commands, in Montenegro, eastern Serbia and northwest Macedonia, and begin immediately attacking the Germans, he was asked to leave Mihailović's headquarters.

Novaković left Ravna Gora and soon joined the Chetniks of Kosta Pećanac. Pećanac gave Novaković command over several detachments in Šumadija, not far from Mihailović's headquarters. Novaković soon realized that Pećanac was actively collaborating with the Germans, and that Mihailović was not engaging in resistance, but merely waiting for an Allied landing in Southeastern Europe. Consequently, he entered into negotiations with the communist Partisans. These talks failed, likely because Novaković insisted on assuming total control of joint operations.

On 18 September 1941, Novaković issued an appeal for a general uprising in and around the town of Aranđelovac, explaining his primary objectives and calling on Chetnik commanders and their detachments to assemble for action against the Germans in four days' time. Though the negotiations with the Partisans had stalled, Novaković still called for "brotherly ... collaboration with all other armed groups who are willing to work with the Chetniks for the national liberation of the Fatherland." Very few band leaders abided by the order. In late September, Novaković gathered about 3,000 under-equipped men, some armed only with scythes and picks, to participate in the attack on Aranđelovac. A sizeable number deserted before seeing any combat, and the remainder dispersed and fled when troops from a small German garrison opened fire. Based on Novaković's orders Dragutin Keserović and other rebel leaders organized the Attack on Kruševac. When Pećanac found out about Novaković's actions, he relieved him of his command. Thoroughly discredited, Novaković lost virtually all his followers.

==== Move to eastern Bosnia, retreat to Montenegro and death ====
Disillusioned with the Chetniks, Novaković left Serbia and went to eastern Bosnia and fought briefly against the Partisans there. In late January 1942, he was captured by some local Partisans and taken to their headquarters in Foča. He stayed there for some time and was kept under constant surveillance, likely because Partisan leader Josip Broz Tito believed that he could be used to counteract Mihailović's influence among Chetniks in eastern Bosnia. In March 1942, a British military mission stopped by the Partisan headquarters in Foča on its way to a meeting with Mihailović. On 15 April 1942, the British left without telling Tito of their intention to meet with Mihailović and Novaković went along. Before leaving, he left Tito a note in which he threatened to raise 5,000 Chetniks to fight the Partisans in eastern Bosnia. Furious, Tito became convinced that the British had devised an elaborate plot to disadvantage the Partisans by strengthening the Chetniks. He wrote to the League of Communists of Croatia: "We now have certain proof that the British, through their agents in Yugoslavia, are working not to remove but rather to intensify the differences between ourselves and other groups such as the Chetniks. England is supporting different Chetnik bands, just as the Germans are doing, and egging them on."

Novaković appeared in Montenegro in 1943 and began reassembling the disorganized Chetnik formations there. He was killed in Montenegro in late 1943. Author Marcia Kurapovna writes that he was shot and killed by the Chetnik 5th Mountain Brigade, on orders from Mihailović. Historian Jozo Tomasevich states that he was captured by the Partisans, tried as an "enemy of the people", and shot.
