= Attack on Kruševac =

- Part of the Uprising in Serbia during World War II in Yugoslavia
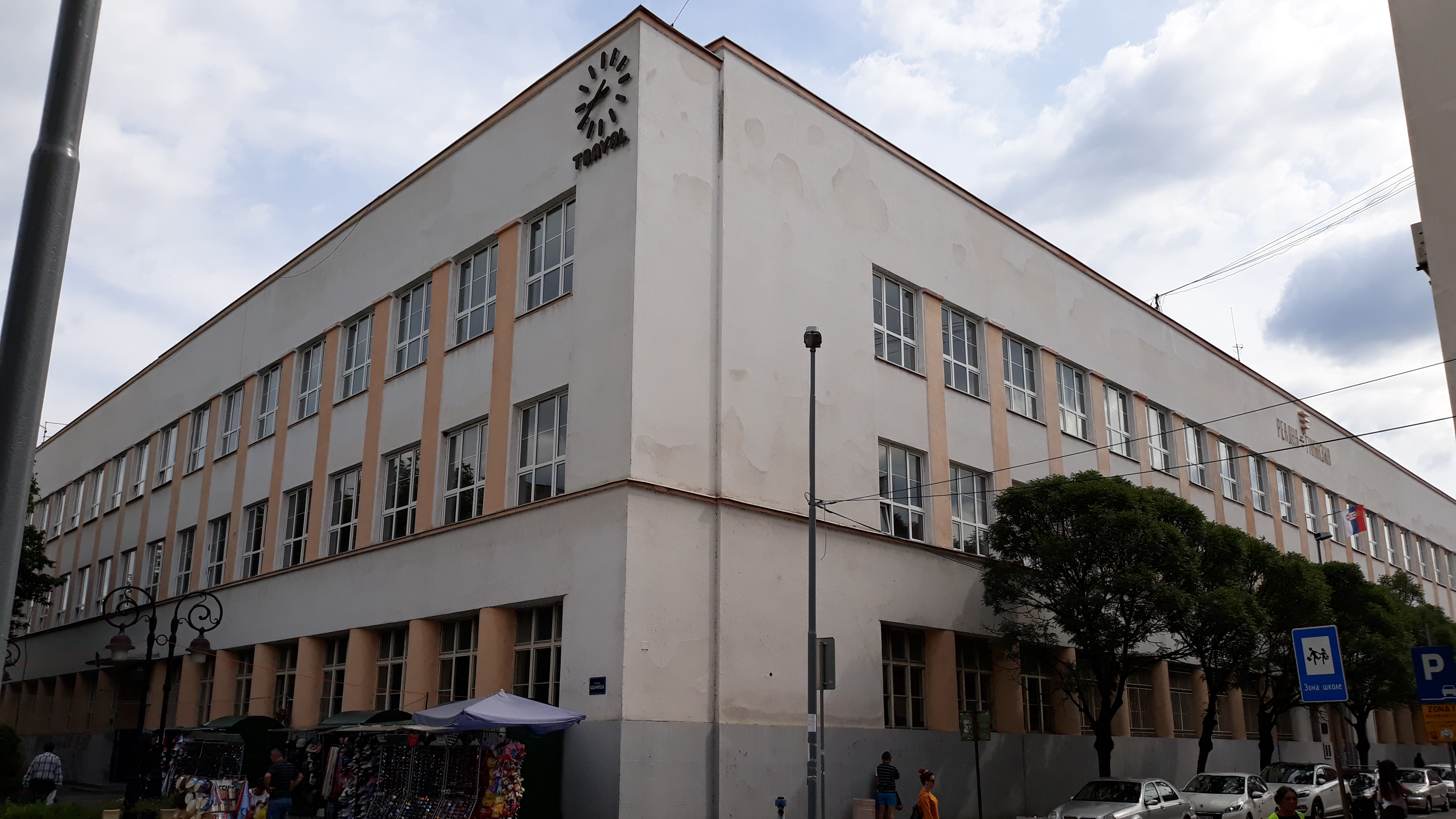
- Kruševac Gymnasium in 2019, in September 1941 it was one of the buildings where German forces organized their last line of defence
Date	23–27 September 1941
Location	Kruševac, Territory of the Military Commander in Serbia
Result	Axis victory

Belligerents
Axis: Germany	Chetniks Yugoslav Partisans

Commanders and leaders
(Nazi Germany) Unknown Captain †; (Nazi Germany) Kosta Pećanac	(Chetniks) Ljubo Novaković; (Chetniks) Dragutin Keserović; (Chetniks) Milutin Radojević; (Yugoslav Partisans) Miloje Zakić

Units involved
717th Infantry Division; 749th Infantry Regiment of; 2nd battalion; Pećanac Chetniks; Goč Detachment	(Chetniks) Rasina Detachment; (Chetniks) Stalać Detachment; (Yugoslav Partisans) Partisan Rasina Detachment

Strength
550 in town's garrison; unknown number of release forces; 500 Pećanac Chetniks	2,000–3,000 rebels

Casualties and losses
28 dead; 16 to 20 wounded	17 dead and 74 wounded rebels; 60–80 civilians

The attack on Kruševac was an attack of Yugoslav rebels on Axis-held Kruševac in the German-occupied territory of Serbia which lasted between 23 and 27 September 1941 during World War II.

== Background ==
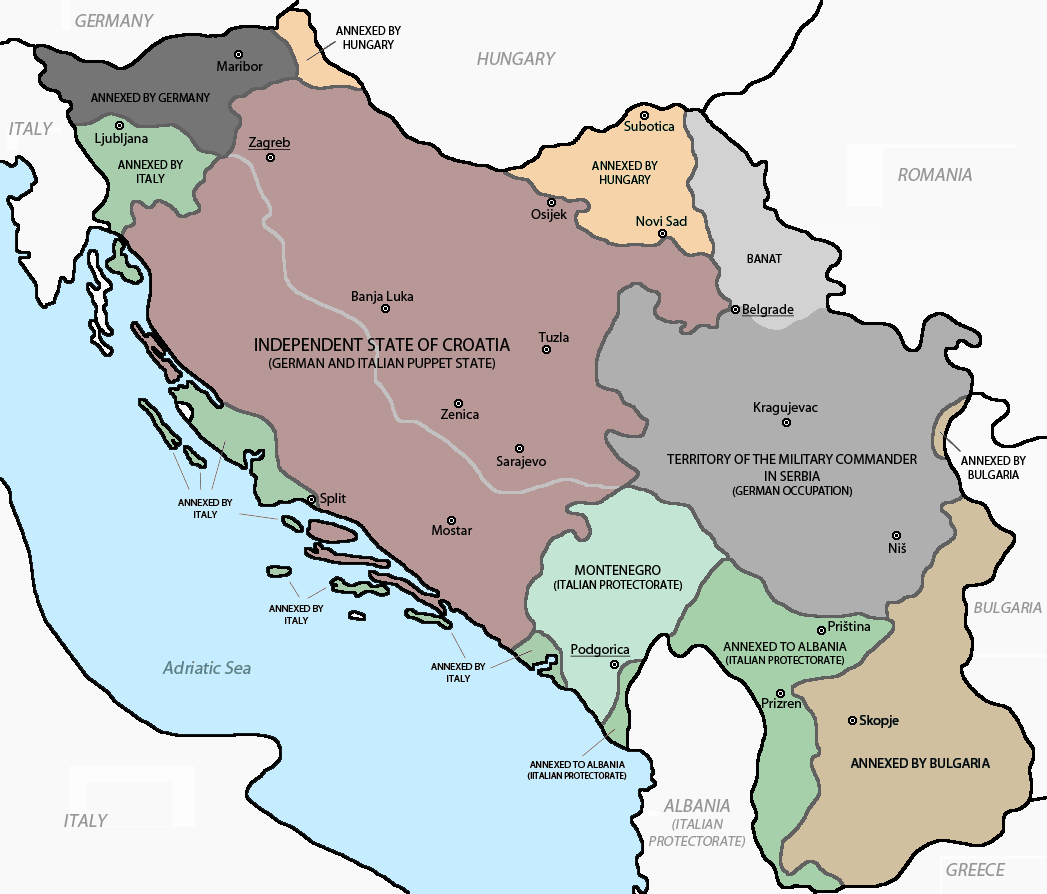
Map showing the occupation and partition of Yugoslavia, 1941–43. The dark and light grey areas on the eastern border show the extent of the German-occupied territory of Serbia.

In April 1941, Germany and its allies invaded and occupied the Kingdom of Yugoslavia, which was then partitioned. Some Yugoslav territory was annexed by its Axis neighbors, Hungary, Bulgaria and Italy. The Germans engineered and supported the creation of the puppet state, the Independent State of Croatia (Croatian: Nezavisna Država Hrvatska, NDH), which roughly comprised most of the pre-war Banovina Croatia, along with rest of present-day Bosnia and Herzegovina and some adjacent territory. The Italians, Hungarians and Bulgarians occupied other parts of Yugoslavian territory. Germany did not annex any Yugoslav territory, but occupied northern parts of present-day Slovenia and stationed occupation troops in the northern half of the NDH. The German-occupied part of Slovenia was divided into two administrative areas that were placed under the administration of the neighboring Reichsgaus.

The remaining territory, which consisted of Serbia proper, the northern part of Kosovo (around Kosovska Mitrovica), and the Banat, was occupied by the Germans and placed under the administration of a German military government. This was due to the key rail and riverine transport routes that passed through it, and its valuable resources, particularly non-ferrous metals.

On 10 April, the Central Committee of the Communist Party of Yugoslavia (Serbo-Croatian Latin: Komunistička partija Jugoslavije, KPJ) appointed a military committee headed by its secretary-general, Josip Broz Tito. From April, the KPJ had an underground network right across the country, including military committees that were preparing for an opportunity to initiate a revolt. In May, the KPJ outlined its policy of "unity and brotherhood among all peoples of Yugoslavia, [and] relentless struggle against the foreign enemies and their domestic helpers as a matter of sheer survival". On 23 June, immediately following the Axis attack on the Soviet Union, the KPJ decided to launch their armed struggle, and in the following week a KPJ operative visited the Rasina District Committee to organise a detachment of the Yugoslav Partisans. On 22 July, the Rasina Detachment was formed in the forest outside Kruševac, initially of 34 fighters, although there was a serious shortage of weapons. About 200 people had volunteered from the town itself.

In late April, Yugoslav Army Colonel Draža Mihailović and a group of about 80 soldiers, who had not followed the orders to surrender, crossed the Drina river into the occupied territory, having marched cross-country from the area of Doboj, in northern Bosnia, which was now part of the NDH. As they passed near Užice on 6 May, the small group was surrounded and almost destroyed by German troops. His force fragmented, and when he reached the isolated mountain plateau of Ravna Gora, his band had shrunk to 34 officers and men. By establishing ties with the local people, and toleration by the gendarmerie in the area, Mihailović created a relatively safe area in which he could consider his future actions. Soon after arriving at Ravna Gora, Mihailović's troops took the name "Chetnik Detachments of the Yugoslav Army". By the end of May, Mihailović had decided that he would adopt a long-term strategy aimed at gaining control over as many armed groups as possible throughout Yugoslavia, in order to be in a position to seize power when the Germans withdrew or were defeated.

== Planning ==
The attack was ordered by Royal Yugoslav Army Brigadier General Ljubo Novaković. It was planned within larger rebel operations against Axis forces in western Serbia in autumn 1941. At the same time rebels kept Kraljevo under siege and the fall of Kruševac would significantly contribute to the fall of Kraljevo.

According to post-war Yugoslav sources, the commander of the Stalać Detachment of the so-called Chetnik Detachments of the Yugoslav Army, Lieutenant Colonel Radojević, held meetings with Miloje Zakić, the representative of the communist-led Yugoslav Partisan forces. They met twice, once in the village of Slatina on 18 September 1941 and the second time a day later in the village of Bovan and developed a plan to attack Kruševac. They agreed that the date of the attack would be 23 September 1941, that Kruševac would be cut off before the attack, that Keserović and his Chetniks would attack the town from the west and the south, across Bagdala and that Partisans would attack from the north and the east.

== Forces ==
The Chetnik part of the attack was to be conducted by the Rasina Detachment under the command of Dragutin Keserović and the Stalać Detachment under the command of Lieutenant Colonel Radojević. A small unit of Pećanac Chetniks also joined the rebels. The Partisan part of the attack was to be conducted by the Rasina Detachment. The total number of rebels who attacked Kruševac was estimated between 1,000 and 10,000 in different sources while most sources agree on 2–3,000 men. Only 500 rebels were armed with firearms, while other carried melee weapons.

The German garrison in Kruševac totaled 550 soldiers. Out of this number, about 350 soldiers belonged to I. Battalion of the 749th Infantry Regiment of the 717th Infantry Division. The Axis garrison in Kruševac was supported by the Goč Detachment of Pećanac Chetniks with 500 men, on the last day of the battle.

== The battle ==
The fighting between attacking rebel forces and Axis garrison lasted for four days.

On the first day Keserović's Rasina Detachment attacked the Kruševac garrison from the direction of Bagdala and Rasina. The hardest battle was waged on the first day of the attack when the Chetniks of the Rasina Detachment pushed the German garrison from their positions on the town's periphery to its center and blocked them in three buildings in the town center: the Gymnasium, the Hotel Belgrade and the Town Hall. The Partisan Rasina Detachment was positioned between Obilićevo and the railway in Dedina and was unable to join the initial surprise attack of Chetnik forces on the first day. As soon as the attack on Kruševac began, Kosta Pećanac insisted to cancel it and to cancel the alliance between Chetniks and Partisans. In his order issued on 23 September and in his appeal to Serbs issued on 24 September, Pećanac condemned his own units that participated in the attack on Kruševac.

On the second day of the attack, Keserović canceled the attack, and retreated with his forces and joined other Chetnik units under Brigadier General Ljubo Novaković in their attack on Axis-held Kraljevo. Therefore, on the second day of the attack only the Chetnik Stalać Detachment and the small Partisan Rasina Detachment continued their joint attacks on the garrison. On the second day of the attack German forces received reinforcements when German infantry, cavalry and tanks arrived from the Niš garrison.

Although the town was well defended the German garrison had 28 dead and 16 to 20 wounded soldiers, including the captain who was the commander of the German battalion and garrison. On the fourth day of the battle Kosta Pećanac himself and a large force of his Chetniks came to reinforce the Axis garrison. The rebels gave up further attacks after having suffered 17 dead and 74 wounded. Keserović and Radojević issued a resolution and condemned Pećanac and Milan Nedić as traitors and invited people to join "National liberation Chetnik detachments" (Serbian: Hационално-ослободилачки четнички одреди) en masse. Pećanac sentenced Keserović and Radojević to death.

== Aftermath ==
After the battle the Germans killed between 60 and 80 civilians in a reprisal for the attack. At the end of September rebels published a printed flyer with text criticizing Kosta Pećanac and signed it as the People's Liberation Movement of Chetniks and Partisans (Serbian: Народноослободилачка војска четника и партизана). The post-war Yugoslav sources blamed Keserović for the failure of the attack on Kruševac. These sources accuse Keserović of attacking the German garrison earlier than agreed and for halting the attack when Partisan forces joined the attack.

Eventually, Soviet Red Army and Yugoslav communist forces captured Kruševac in Autumn 1944 and established communist regime which lasted for about fifty years.

== Sources ==
- Dimitrijević, Bojan B. (2014). Vojska Nedićeve Srbije: Oružane snage srpske vlade, 1941–1945 [The Army of Nedić's Serbia: The Armed Forces of the Serbian Government, 1941–1945] (in Serbian). Belgrade, Serbia: Službeni Glasnik. ISBN 978-86-519-1811-0.
- Karchmar, Lucien (1973). Draz̆a Mihailović and the Rise of the C̆etnik Movement, 1941-1942. Department of History, Stanford University.
- Kroener, Bernard R.; Müller, Rolf-Dieter; Umbreit, Hans, eds. (2000). Germany and the Second World War, Volume 5: Organization and Mobilization of the German Sphere of Power. Part I. Wartime Administration, Economy, and Manpower Resources 1939-1941. Vol. 5. New York, New York: Oxford University Press. ISBN 978-0-19-822887-5.
- Glišić, Venceslav; Borković, Milan (1975). Komunistička partija Jugoslavije u Srbiji 1941-1945: 1941-1942. Rad.
- Kovbasko, Budimka (1971). Kriva reka: (kopaonička). Istorijski arhiv; Brue, Zajodnica kulture.
- Milazzo, Matteo J. (1975). The Chetnik movement & the Yugoslav resistance. Baltimore: Johns Hopkins University Press. ISBN 978-0-8018-1589-8.
- Perović, Milivoje (1961). Južna Srbija. Nolit.
- Nikolić, Kuzman (1999). Napad na Kruševac 1941 (in Serbian). Kruševac, Serbia: Narodna Biblioteka Kruševac.
- Shepherd, Ben (2012). Terror in the Balkans : German armies and partisan warfare. Cambridge, Mass.: Harvard University Press. ISBN 978-0-674-04891-1.
- Tomasevich, Jozo (1975). The Chetniks. Stanford University Press. ISBN 978-0-8047-0857-9.
- Tomasevich, Jozo (2001). War and revolution in Yugoslavia, 1941-1945 : occupation and collaboration. Stanford, Calif.: Stanford University Press. ISBN 0-8047-3615-4.
