= Chetnik sabotage of Axis communication lines =

- Part of World War II in Yugoslavia and Western Desert campaign
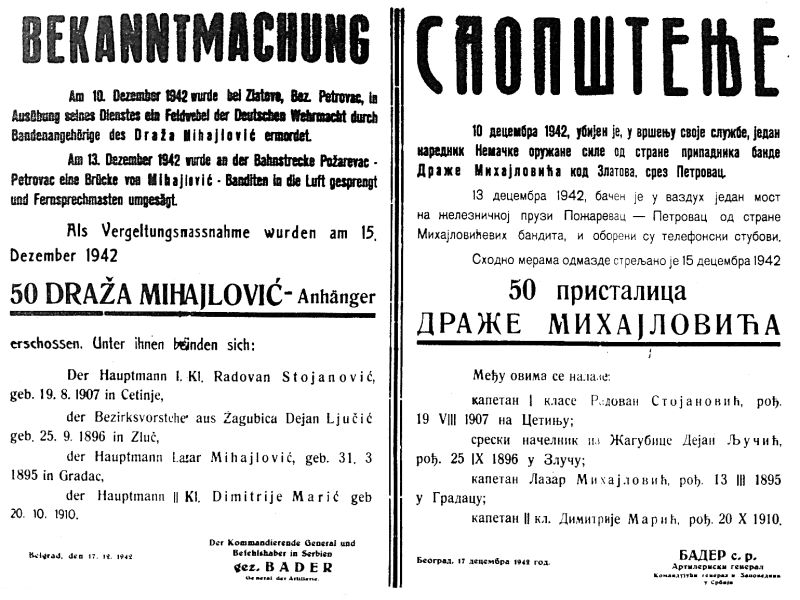
- German poster about shooting 50 men of Draža Mihailović because of destruction of railway bridge between Požarevac and Petrovac na Mlavi in December 1942
Date	31 April, or July or early August 1942 – 1943
Location	Territory of the Military Commander in Serbia

Belligerents
Axis: Germany	Chetniks

Commanders and leaders
Unknown	(Chetniks) Draža Mihailović (Chetniks) Dragutin Keserović (Chetniks) Velimir Piletić

Units involved
	(Chetniks) Rasina Corps; (Chetniks) Krajina Corps; (Chetniks) Avala Corps

The Chetnik sabotage of Axis communication lines was a campaign of the Yugoslav Army in the Fatherland (commonly known as the Chetniks) in which it sabotaged Axis communication lines, mostly along the rivers Morava, Vardar and Danube, to obstruct the transport of German war material through Serbia to Thessaloniki and further to Libya during the Western Desert campaign. The Chetnik sabotages were organized from 31 April, or according to some sources, since July or early August 1942.

After initial support to Mihailovićs Chetniks tactics used against Axis forces in Serbia, since the closing of Summer 1942 the British started to believe that such actions were not enough. On the other hand, the German command decided that such actions were enough for them to make a adecision to annihilate the Chetniks.

During the period, in which these events took place, the Chetnik command was embedded with a members of the British mission, Edgar Hargreeves and Jasper Rootem.

== Background ==
The British General Harold Alexander sent a personal telegram to Draža Mihailović before the offensive against Rommel in Africa, requesting him to organize a large-scale campaign against Axis lines of communication in order to obstruct transport of German war material through Serbia to Thessaloniki and further to Libya. Mihailović wanted to keep British confidence in Yugoslav Army in the Fatherland, which was bound to strain because tacit cooperation with Italians, Mihailović decided to engage his forces in German-occupied Serbia in a sabotage campaign against German railway transports. The sabotage actions against railway was the least risky and could prove to the Allies that Chetniks were able to create diversions in the German rear in case of an Allied landing in the Balkans.

== Sabotage actions to railway ==
The Chetniks launched a campaign of sabotage on Axis railways, mostly to important Belgrade-Niš-Thessaloniki railway over which Axis forces moved big quantities of ware materials for transshipment from Thessaloniki to African front.

The Chetnik sabotage of railways began on 31 April 1942 when Captain Lazović ordered all commanders of brigades to establish groups of four people who work on railway to work for Chetniks and who will take out fuel, food and arms from trains. Many of the railway workers were informants of Mihailovic and informed him about important supply deliveries or important movement of German troops.

In May 1942 Mihailović demanded heavy explosives from the British command to be used for destruction of the German supply lines running through Serbia and Aegean to German troops in North Africa.

To execute the acts of sabotages The Main Staff for Railway Sabotage was created in Belgrade in Summer 1942, with subordinate railway staffs for four regions. The sabotages were entrusted to railway employees in Serbia who would be assisted by Chetnik diversion groups called Trojkas (groups of three).

On 9 August 1942 Mihailović sent directive through his connection "506" in Belgrade to sabotage railways and trains along Morava and Vardar river. On 26 August Mihailović sent instructions to Major Radoslav Đurić to organize diversion teams of three men for sabotage actions on the railway between Vranje and Belgrade.

On 20 September 1942 Slobodan Jovanović, the president of the Yugoslav Government in Exile informed Mihailović about the request of General Alexander, British commander in the Middle East, that Chetniks should attack Axis communication lines and do another favor to Allied cause. On 25 September 1942 Jovanović sent another message to General Mihailović with a request to sabotage Axis transports of war material toward Thessaloniki, emphasizing that it was of vital interest for Allied cause. To support the Western Desert campaign, the Chetniks organized a campaign against Axis communications through German-occupied Serbia. This campaign was witnessed by Hudson.

On 6 November Jovanović sent another message to General Mihailović, emphasizing that the British government recognized Chetnik actions until then and the scale of reprisals these actions caused. Jovanović further informed Mihailović that the British requested the Chetniks to double their efforts, underlining that it would be the most direct and useful contribution to the struggle of Allied forces in Africa.

After his arrival to Chetnik HQ, Bailey decided to reinforce British missions in Yugoslavia with well trained military sappers who could help the Chetniks to be more effective in sabotaging German lines of communications. Of the 362 locomotives that operated on the railway line Belgrade-Niš-Thessaloniki the Chetniks reported that 112 out of action by December 1942. A member of American mission John Jock from Chicago was assigned to the Avala Corps of the Yugoslav Army in the Fatherland, also of Yugoslav descent, who was main organizer for of sabotages on the railway Belgrade-Nis and Belgrade-Raska-Kosovska Mitrovica.

In his post-war memoirs Chetnik officer Radomir Petrović Kent emphasized that Chetnik Boljevac Brigade under his command conducted 40 diversions on railway used for German transports to Rommels forces during the battle in Africa.

Based on the British requests, the headquarters of the Yugoslav Army in the Fatherland ordered their forces to prepare to sabotage the railways in German-occupied Serbia. Following on from these orders, Dragutin Keserović who was a commander of the Rasina Corps issued a general directive urging peasants in his area of operations to hide grain, livestock and fodder from the occupying forces.

== Attempt to block the Danube in Đerdap ==
Based on the agreement between Draža Mihailović and Colonel William Bailey who was head of British Liaison Officers at Chetnik HQ, nine British sub-missions that had their own separate radio communication with SOE base in Cairo were transported by airplanes and parachuted to headquarters of various Chetnik Corps since April 1943. The first mission under command of Major Eric Greenwood was parachuted to Homolje in HQ of Krajina Corps under command of Velimir Piletić and second group of two officers, Major Jasper Rootem and New Zealand Colonel Edgar Hargreeves joined them on 21 May 1943. They participated in attack of Chetniks of Krajina Corps on German boats on Danube and other acts of sabotage of German railway transports through Serbia.

Mihailović could not believe that British and Americans could support Communists against him so he continued to act as part of the Allies and stepped up anti-German sabotage in the second half of 1943. The reason for attacking German boats on Danube in October 1943 in village Boljetin in Đerdap was to sink them and to block this important transport route for Axis forces. The attack was organized by Porečka Brigade of Krajina Corps. This brigade used a small canon to sink two boats with armor-piercing shells, but failed. The boats that were heavily damaged and remained on the Romanian side of the Danube for repair.

== Reactions ==
=== Allied reactions ===
On 1 December 1942 Mihalovic received a greeting from the Chief of the British Imperial General Staff Alan Brooke who expressed his felicitations for the wonderful undertaking of the Yugoslav Army. The campaign of Mihailović's Chetniks against Axis communications was commended by British Near East Command in a telegram to Mihailovic on 16 August 1943 stating: "With admiration we are following your directed operations which are of inestimable value to our allied cause."

Until the end of Summer 1942 the British command and SOE favored resistance action which corresponds to Mihailovićs opinion. In August 1942 the SOE director Hugh Dalton reported:

'The Yugoslavs [the government in exile in London], the War Office and we are all agreed that the guerrilla and sabotage bands now active in Yugoslavia should show sufficient active resistance to cause constant embarrassment to the occupying forces, and prevent any reduction in their numbers. But they should keep their organisation underground and avoid any attempt at large scale risings or ambitious military operations, which could only result at present in severe repression and the loss of our key men. They should now do all they can to prepare a widespread underground organisation ready to strike hard later on, when we give the signal.'

Historian Milazzo emphasize that the Yugoslav Government in Exile and Mihailović as its member did not want to subject the people of Serbia to German reprisals, like those in 1941, so the sabotage campaign was shortlived after being initiated only in early August 1942.

Even during 1944, when communists were repeatedly attacking Chetniks mostly with arms and supplies they received from Allies or with their support, the Chetniks sabotaged German communications, engaged in smaller battles and rescued Allied airmen shot down in Yugoslavia.

=== Axis reactions ===
Because of the Chetnik sabotage campaign the Germans decided to settle accounts once for all with Mihailovićs Chetniks, while on the other hand British command expected more of it.

Hitler blamed Chetniks in Serbia for his defeat in Africa and issued an order for the complete annihilation of all Chetnik forces also sent to Mussolini in a letter on 16 February 1943.

We have no other choice, but to annihilate all Chetniks and against the bandits use the most brutal means.

— Adolf Hitler

The post war Yugoslav sources published information about negotiations between Chetniks and Germans who insisted that Chetniks should cease struggle and sabotage actions against German forces and their allies as a precondition for an eventual agreement.

== Sources ==
- Piekałkiewicz, Janusz (January 1984). Krieg auf dem Balkan, 1940-1945. Südwest. ISBN 978-3-517-00790-8.
- Minich, Mihailo (1975). Excerpts from the Book "The Scattered Bones". Minich.
- Ogden, Alan (2010). Through Hitler's Back Door: SOE Operations in Hungary, Slovakia, Romania and Bulgaria 1939-1945. Pen & Sword Military. ISBN 978-1-84884-248-9.
- Milazzo, Matteo J. (1 March 1975). The Chetnik movement & the Yugoslav resistance. Johns Hopkins University Press. ISBN 978-0-8018-1589-8.
- Rootham, Jasper; Dimitrijević, Bojan B. (2004). Pucanj u prazno. Institute of Contemporary History, Belgrade. ISBN 978-86-7403-090-5.
- Dimitrijević, Bojan; Nikolić, Kosta (2004). Đeneral Mihailović: biografija. Institute of Contemporary History, Belgrade. ISBN 978-86-7403-095-0.
- Bosiljčić, Slobodan (1963). Istočna Srbija. Prosveta.
- Beloff, Nora (1985). Tito's flawed legacy: Yugoslavia & the West since 1939. Westview Press. ISBN 978-0-8133-0322-2.
- Живковић, Душан (2000). Контроверзе четницке организације Драгољуба-Драже Михаиловића, 1941-1945: од идеологије и утопије до издаје. Стручна књига.
- Dević, Nemanja (2008). Истина под кључем: Доња Јасеница у Другом светском рату. Службени Гласник.
- Đuković, Isidor (1982). Druga šumadijska 21. srpska udarna brigada. Narodna knjiga.
- Pešić, Miodrag D. (2002). Operation Air Bridge: Serbian Chetniks and the Rescued American Airmen in World War II. Serbian Master's Society. ISBN 978-86-82235-12-5.
- Ford, Kirk (1992). OSS and the Yugoslav resistance, 1943-1945. Texas A&M University Press. ISBN 978-0-89096-517-7.
- Repac, Stanley (1957). Draza Mihailovich. University of Wisconsin--Madison.
- Zalar, Charles (1961). Yugoslav Communism: A Critical Study. U.S. Government Printing Office.
- Kent, Radomir Petrović (1999). Četnici istočne Srbije. Pogledi.
- Đurić, Veljko Đ; Mijović, Miličko (1993). Ilustrovana istorija četničkog pokreta. Narodna knj.
- Jukić, Ilija (1974). The fall of Yugoslavia. Harcourt Brace Jovanovich. ISBN 978-0-15-130100-3.
