= Velimir Piletić =

Yugoslav Chetnik commander

- Велимир Пилетић
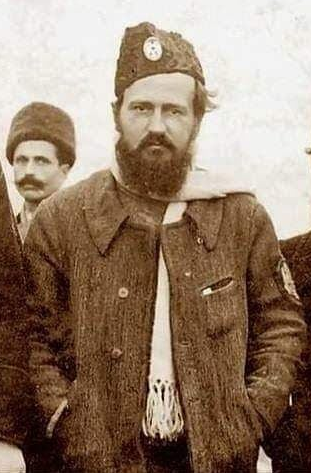
- Velimir Piletić during World War II
- Born: 2 May 1906; Belgrade, Kingdom of Serbia
- Died: 23 July 1972 (aged 66); Paris, France
- Spouse: Olivera
- Military career
- Allegiance: Kingdom of Yugoslavia
- Branch: Chetniks
- Rank: Major; Lt. Colonel; Colonel
- Nickname: Velja
- Commands: Krajina Chetnik Corps
- Conflicts: Chetnik sabotage of Axis communication lines

Velimir Piletić (Serbian Cyrillic: Велимир Пилетић; 2 May 1906 – 23 July 1972) was a Yugoslav military officer, best known as commander of the Chetnik forces in eastern Serbia (the Krajina and Mlava Chetnik Corps) during World War II.

== World War II ==
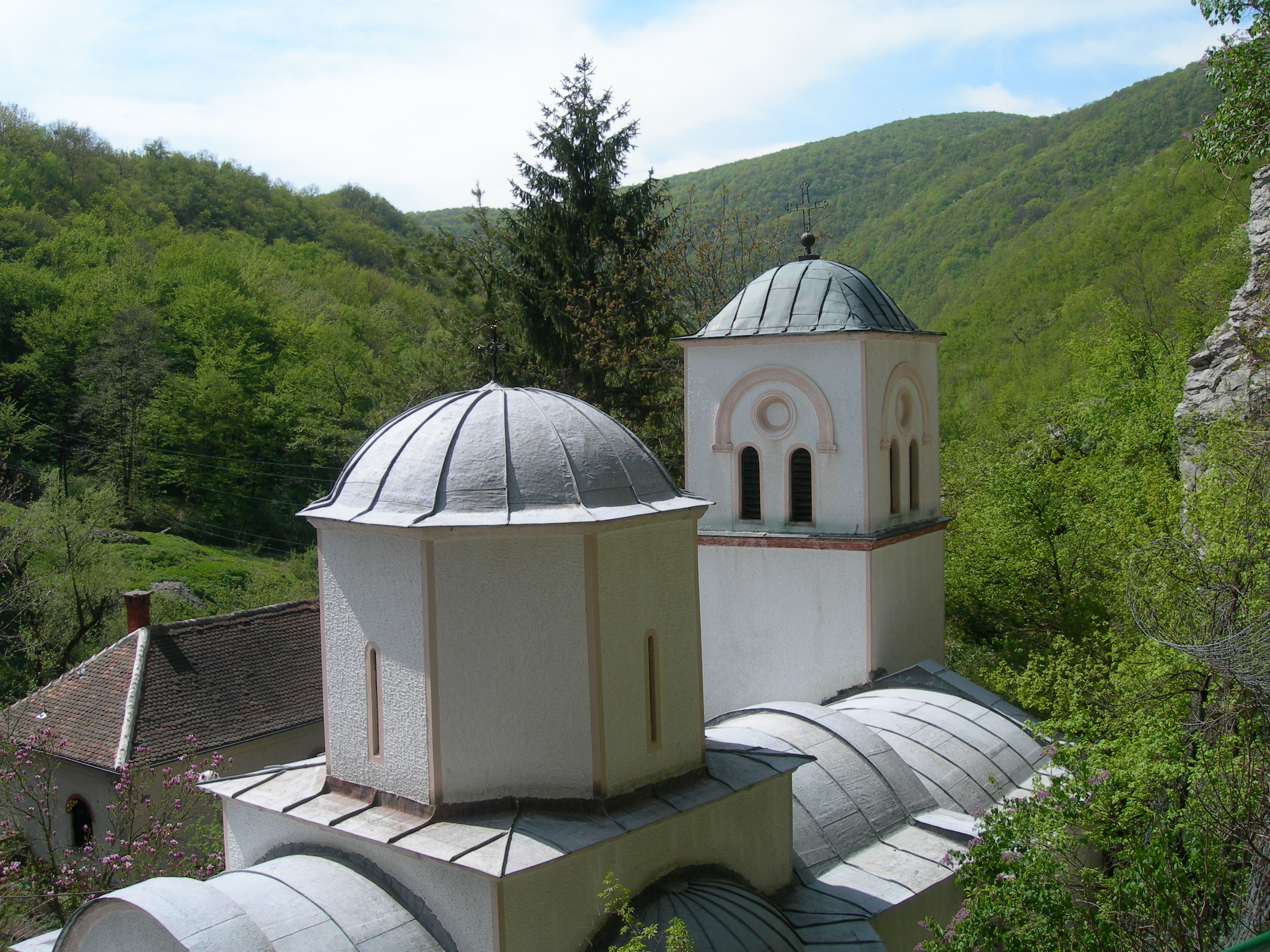
The headquarter of Krajina Chetnik Detachment was in Gornjak Monastery (2009 photo)

In May 1941, Piletić organized guerilla rebels in eastern Serbia, initially without any connection with other former Yugoslav officers who were doing the same thing in other parts of Serbia. After establishing his headquarters in the Gornjak Monastery, Piletić established connection with rebels in Belgrade and Banat. Colonel Pantić, who was in Belgrade at the time, sent Captains Pejčić and Avezić along with five Yugoslav aviation officers, including Colonel Lazar Dabetić.

Mihailović asked Piletić to lead Chetniks in Montenegro (Montenegro, Boka and Sandžak) but Piletić refused, requesting command over Chetniks of Bosnia instead. This was refused by Mihailović as this command had already been given to Boško Todorović. Instead, Mihailović appointed Piletić as commander of all Chetniks in Eastern Serbia.

=== Chetnik-Partisan negotiations of 1941 ===
Piletić, who was a Major at the time, participated (as a delegate of Mihailović) in negotiations about cooperation between Chetniks and Partisans, held in Belgrade on 8 September 1941, along with three other Chetnik delegates. The Chetnik delegation was led by Colonel Branislav Pantić while the Partisan delegation was led by Blagoje Nešković, Đuro Strugar and a person with a cover-name of "student". According to Marković and Marjanović, this person was actually Vojo Nikolić.

The Chetnik delegates tried to convince the Partisans to stop their offensive activities against Axis forces, but the negotiations ended without agreement.

=== Struggle against Communists and Fascists ===
To better organize the struggle against Communists and Fascists, Chetniks organized two Corps in eastern Serbia. One of them was the Krajina Chetnik Corp. According to Partisan sources, the Krajina Chetnik Corp operated on the territory of Counties of Jabukovac, Kladovo, Donji Milanovac and Golubac, and was the biggest and best equipped Chetnik corp in Eastern Serbia. Based on the agreement between Draža Mihailović and Colonel William Bailey who was head of British Liaison Officers at Chetnik HQ, nine British sub-missions that had their own separate radio communication with SOE base in Cairo were transported by airplanes and parachuted to headquarters of various Chetnik Corps since April 1943. The first mission under command of Major Eric Greenwood was parachuted to Homolje in HQ of Krajina Corps under command of Velimir Piletić and second group of two officers, Major Jasper Rootham and New Zealand Colonel Edgar Hargreeves joined them on 21 May 1943. They participated in attack of Chetniks of Krajina Corps on German boats on Danube and other acts of sabotage of German railway transports through Serbia. The reason for attacking German boats on Danube in October 1943 in village Boljetin in Đerdap was to sink them and to block this important transport route for Axis forces. The attack was organized by Porečka Brigade of Krajina Corps. This brigade used a small canon to sink two boats with armor-piercing shells, but failed. The boats that were heavily damaged and remained on Romanian side of Danube for repair. As part of terror against Partisan sympathizers, Chetnik troops under Piletić killed 4 and beat up 6 villagers in village of Trubarevac near Soko Banja in July 1944.

=== Cooperation with Red Army ===
Piletić was appointed to the position of representative of the Chetnik Supreme Command for Romania, under the pseudonym "Popesku". Piletić initiated contacts with the bishop of Timișoara (Temišvar). Robert H. McDowell emphasizes that Piletić was warmly and enthusiastically greeted in Romanian headquarters of the Red Army in Craiova.

At the beginning of September 1944, Piletić and his Chetniks attacked German marine troops that retreated through Đerdap, and captured 80 German soldiers. According to the historian Dinčić, Chetniks and Romanians exchanged officers for communications and agreed on joint actions against the German fleet. Dinčić claims that it was Piletić's ultimatum to the German command to surrender all their ships within 24 hours which forced them to sink all 220 ships of the German Black Sea fleet which had retreated via the Danube through Đerdap.

Initially, the Krajina Chetnik Corps and Red Army established friendly contacts and in joint actions captured the Western Morava Valley and Kruševac. However, the relationship soured and the Chetniks were subsequently attacked. According to report of local partisans in Serbia from 12 September, after failure of negotiations with the Soviets, Krajina Corps disintagrated and large part of its membership joined the partisans. During mid September Chetniks under lieutenant Pajović near Kladovo rejected Piletić's command and founded a 'partisan' detachment. Piletić claimed in an interview given to McDowell that he and the other Chetniks who accompanied him were captured after they left a meeting with Red Army General Staff and went to sleep. Piletić claimed that they were not captured by Red Army soldiers, but by former Ustaše unit (the Croatian Legion) under the command of former Ustaše General Marko Mesić, which had been forcibly mobilized by the Soviets when it was captured after the Battle of Stalingrad and subsequently made part of Yugoslav Communist armed forces. Mesić and his men killed all the Chetniks except Piletić, who was sent to Lubianka Prison. Piletić later managed to escape to Austria while he was being transported by train to Belgrade at the request of the new Yugoslav communist government which wanted to put him on trial. The Allies placed him in the St. Johann im Pongau refugee camp.

== Post-war period ==
At a trial in Paris after the war ended, Piletić was cleared of all charges. Piletić became active in Serb emigrant circles which included Nikola Kavaja. According to some sources, Piletić was a member of the Serbian Liberation Movement Fatherland (Serbian: Српски ослободилачки покрет Отаџбина).

== Bibliography ==
Piletić wrote his memoirs titled "The Destiny of Serbian Officer" (Serbian: Sudbina srpskog oficira).

== Sources ==
- Vučković, Zvonimir; Krstić, Uglješa (2001). Ravnogorska istorijska čitanka: povest nacionalnog pokreta otpora u II svetskom ratu kroz dela učesnika i svedoka : jubilarno izdanje povodom šezdesetgodišnjice, 1941-2001. Bajat.
- Institut (1982). Beiträge zur Geschichte des Sozialismus. Institut za izučavanje radničkog pokreta.
- Narodna (1959). Istorija XX veka: zbornik radova. Narodna knjiga.
- Radan, Peter; Pavković, Aleksandar (1 January 1997). The Serbs and Their Leaders in the Twentieth Century. Ashgate. ISBN 978-1-85521-891-8.
- Bosiljčić, Slobodan (1963). Istočna Srbija. Prosveta.
- Marković, Života (1988). Tito i Užička republika. Vesti. ISBN 9788673190136.
- Marjanović, Jovan (1964). Beograd. Nolit.
- Institut (1972). NOR i revolucija u Srbiji, 1941-1945: naučni skup posvećen 30-godišnjici ustanka, održan na Zlatiboru 25-26 septembra 1971. Institut za istoriju radničkog pokreta Srbije.
- Rootham, Jasper; Димитријевић, Бојан Б (2004). Pucanj u prazno. Institut za savremenu istoriju. ISBN 9788674030905.
- Dimitrijević, Bojan; Nikolić, Kosta (2004). Đeneral Mihailović: biografija. Институт за савремену историју (Belgrade, Serbia). ISBN 9788674030950.
- Đurić, Veljko Đ; Mijović, Miličko (1993). Ilustrovana istorija četničkog pokreta. Narodna knj.
- Živanović, Sergije M. (1962). Treći srpski ustanak, 1941 (in Serbian). Izdanje autora i Američkog Instituta za Balkanska Pitanja.
- Radanović, Milan (2016). Kazna i zločin: Snage kolaboracije u Srbiji. Rosa Luxemburg Stiftung.
