= Richard Kaaserer =

SS and Police Leader and SS-Oberführer (1896–1947)

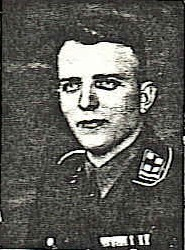
- Born: 21 August 1896; Trento, Austrian Tyrol, Austro-Hungarian Empire
- Died: 24 January 1947 (age 50); Belgrade, PR Serbia, FPR Yugoslavia
- Cause of death: Execution by hanging
- Military career
- Allegiance: Austria-Hungary; Austria; Nazi Germany
- Branch: Austro-Hungarian Army; Austrian Army; Schutzstaffel; Waffen-SS
- Service years: 1916-1918; 1919-1922; 1932-1945
- Rank: Oberleutnant (Austria-Hungary); Hauptmann (Austria); SS-Oberführer and Oberst of Police; Sturmbannführer of reserves (Waffen-SS)
- Commands: SS and Police Leader, "Sandžak;" "Mitte-Norwegen"
- Conflicts: World War I World War II
- Awards: Iron Cross, 2nd class War Merit Cross, 2nd class with Swords; Blood Order

Richard Kaaserer (21 August 1896 – 24 January 1947) was an Austrian SS-Oberführer and Oberst of Police who served in the Waffen-SS, and as an SS and Police Leader (SSPF) in Serbia and Norway during the Second World War. After the war, he was executed for war crimes in Yugoslavia.

== Early life ==
Richard Kaaserer, the son of a gendarmerie officer, was born in Trento, then in the Austrian Tyrol. After attending elementary school and high school, he attended the infantry and cavalry military cadet schools in Straß in Steiermark and Mährisch-Weißkirchen, respectively. Kaaserer joined the Austro-Hungarian Army in August 1916 as a Leutnant and served in the First World War with an infantry regiment on both the eastern and Italian fronts. Promoted to Oberleutnant in August 1917, he was a platoon leader, battalion adjutant and company commander. After being gassed in June 1918, he saw no further combat. After the end of the war he remained a career officer in the Austrian army until resigning in February 1922 with the rank of Hauptmann. From 1922 to 1925 he belonged to the Freikorps Oberland and from 1928 to 1932 to the Styrian Heimwehr (Home Guard).

== SS career in Austria and Germany ==
On 1 June 1932 Kasserer joined the Nazi Party (membership number 1,087,778) and on 15 July of the same year he joined the SS. Commissioned an SS-Sturmführer on 25 September 1932, he commanded an SS battalion until 9 December when he took over as the first commander of the 52nd SS-Standarte, headquartered in Vienna. Following the banning of the Austrian Nazi Party on 19 June 1933, Kaaserer fled to Germany on 26 July where he assisted in organizing the Austrian Legion among fellow expatriates. He was posted as a Special Duties Officer in SS-Oberabschnitte (Main District) "Südwest," based in Stuttgart, and then in the Political Preparedness Department in Württemberg. He returned to Austria in July 1934, took part in the failed July Putsch and was imprisoned in Austria from July 1934 to October 1937, for which he was later awarded the Nazi Party's Blood Order.

On his release from prison, Kaaserer returned to Germany and was assigned from December 1937 to June 1938 to SS-Oberabschnitt "Ost" (later, "Spree") with headquarters in Berlin, heading the regional SS Race and Settlement Main Office (RuSHA) staff there. He was promoted to SS-Standartenführer on 21 June 1938 and then spent several months working in the RuSHA headquarters in Berlin. In September 1938, after the Anschluss, he again returned to Austria as head of SS education in SS-Oberabschnitt "Donau" in Vienna. On 1 January 1939, he returned to Germany to become the Chief of Staff in SS-Abschnitt (District) XXXII in Augsburg. Promoted to SS-Oberführer on 9 November 1940, he returned to RuSHA headquarters the next month and headed departments dealing with family and ancestry until February 1942, remaining a member of the RuSHA staff until July 1943.

== Wartime service ==
On 20 June 1942, Kaaserer joined the Waffen-SS as an SS-Hauptsturmführer of reserves and was sent to the Balkans as commander of the 1st Battalion of the SS 2nd Mountaineer Regiment, 7th SS Volunteer Mountain Division Prinz Eugen. This division had been organized in 1941 from the ethnic Germans (Volksdeutsche) living in the Banat area but, despite its name, the majority of its recruits were not volunteers but conscripts coerced into service. In October 1942, Kaaserer led his battalion in Operation Kopaonik, an anti-Chetnik campaign in which hundreds of Serbian civilians in the village of Kriva Reka were killed and their houses burned. He served with his unit until February 1943 when he was court-martialed due to brutality and degrading treatment of recruits. He was transferred out of the division, charged before the Supreme SS and Police Court in Munich and received a severe reprimand from Reichsführer-SS Heinrich Himmler.

Dismissed from the Waffen-SS, Kaaserer was deployed for police duties, assigned to the staff of the Higher SS and Police Leader (HSSPF) in the Nazi puppet state of Croatia, SS-Gruppenführer Konstantin Kammerhofer. He was appointed Polizeigebeitsführer (Police Area Leader) of Knin in Dalmatia from 27 July 1943 to 20 May 1944. While in this post, he conducted anti-partisan operations in Zagreb in September and October 1943. On 21 June 1944, Kaaserer was transferred to the office of the HSSPF "Serbia, Sandžak and Montenegro," SS-Gruppenführer Hermann Behrends. Kaaserer was promoted to SSPF "Sandžak," the only person to hold this position. His duties again largely involved internal security, anti-partisan and anti-guerilla warfare. His last posting came on 28 November 1944 when he was transferred to the newly created post of SSPF "Mitte-Norwegen" (Central Norway) in Bergen which he held until the end of the war in Europe on 8 May 1945.

After the cessation of hostilities, Kasserer was arrested and extradited to Yugoslavia. He was tried for war crimes by the Supreme Military Court in Belgrade, sentenced to death on 22 December 1946, and executed by hanging on 24 January 1947.

SS and Police ranks
| Date | Rank |
|---|---|
| September 1932 | SS-Sturmführer |
| December 1932 | SS-Sturmhauptführer |
| March 1933 | SS-Sturmbannführer |
| November 1933 | SS-Obersturmbannführer |
| June 1938 | SS-Standartenführer |
| November 1940 | SS-Oberführer und Oberst der polizei |
| June 1942 | SS-Hauptsturmführer der reserve (Waffen-SS) |
| October 1942 | SS-Sturmbannführer der reserve (Waffen-SS) |

== Awards ==
- Wound Badge in black
- Iron Cross (1939) 2nd class
- War Merit Cross 2nd class with Swords
- Blood Order

== Sources ==
- Graf, Wolfgang (2012). Österreichische SS-Generäle. Himmlers verlässliche Vasallen. Hermagoras-Verlag. ISBN 978-3-7086-0578-4.
- Heinemann, Isabel (2003). Rasse, Siedlung, deutsches Blut: Das Rasse- und Siedlungshauptamt der SS und die rassenpolitische Neuordnung Europas. Wallstein. ISBN 978-3-892-44623-1.
- Schiffer Publishing Ltd., ed. (2000). SS Officers List: SS-Standartenführer to SS-Oberstgruppenführer (As of 30 January 1942). Schiffer Military History Publishing. ISBN 0-7643-1061-5.
- Williamson, Gordon (1994). The SS:Hitler's Instrument of Terror. Amber Books. ISBN 978-1-907-44656-6.
- Yerger, Mark C. (1997). Allgemeine-SS: The Commands, Units and Leaders of the General SS. Schiffer Publishing Ltd. ISBN 0-7643-0145-4.
