= Operation Kopaonik =

Large-scale Axis offensive military operation in World War II

- Part of World War II in Yugoslavia
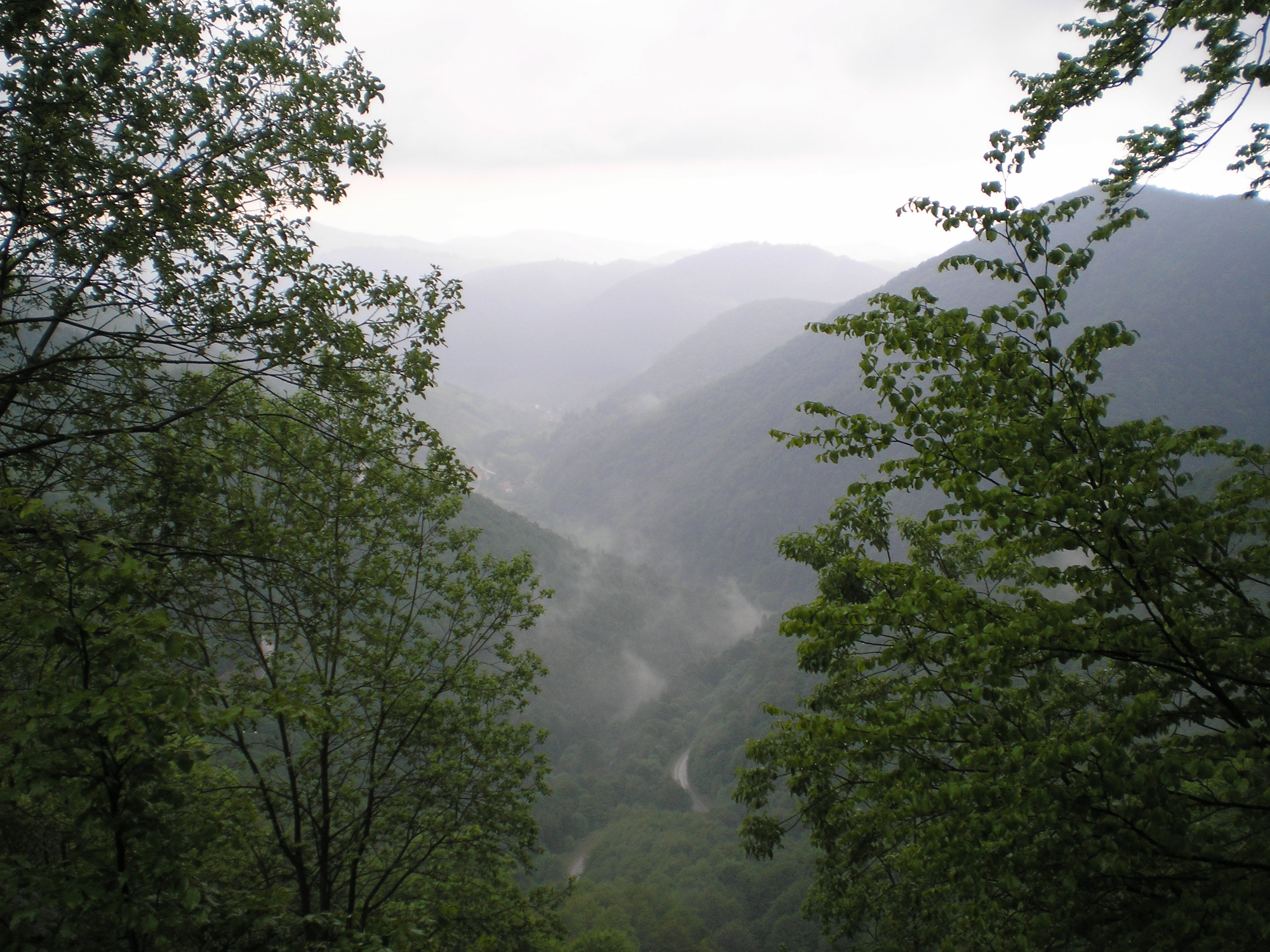
| Date | 11–14 October 1942 |
| Location | Region around Kriva Reka on Kopaonik, Central Serbia |
| Result | Waffen-SS victory: Mass murder of Serb civilians. |

Belligerents
| Germany; Bulgaria | Chetniks |

Commanders and leaders
| (Nazi Germany) Artur Phleps; August Schmidhuber; Richard Kaaserer; Wagner; Landverer; (Tsardom of Bulgaria (1908–1946)) Petar Panev | (Chetniks) Dragutin Keserović |

Units involved
| (Schutzstaffel) 14th Regiment of the 7th SS Volunteer Mountain Division Prinz Eugen; 6,000 in three infantry battalions; 1,000 Several battalions of Bulgarian 9th Infantry Division; 300 Russian Protective Corps | (Chetniks) Rasina Corps |

Casualties and losses
| Unknown | 690 murdered civilians |

Operation Kopaonik was a large-scale Axis offensive launched against the Mihailović's Chetniks in Axis occupied Yugoslavia during World War II. The operation was inspired by Heinrich Himmler who believed that the annihilation of Draža Mihailović and his forces was a basis for a success in Serbia and South East Europe. Since Dragutin Keserović and his Rasina Corps was probably the most active commander of Mihailovićs Chetniks in Serbia, the newly established 7th SS Volunteer Mountain Division Prinz Eugen was engaged to participate in Operation Kopaonik to destroy Keserović and Chetnik unit under his command.

Besides the 7th SS Volunteer Mountain Division Prinz Eugen the Axis forces consisted of several battalions of Bulgarian 9th Infantry Division also. All of them commanded by Artur Phleps. The Yugoslav forces targeted in Operation Kopaonik consisted of Rasina Corps of Chetniks of Draža Mihailović under command of Dragutin Keserović. The operation failed because Keserović was informed about the movement of the Axis forces and successfully retreated his forces before the Axis forces surrounded the targeted region. Still, Himmler was pleased with participation of the Prinz Eugen Division and immediately after the operation ended he visited it for three days.

During this operation Axis forces committed mass murder of hundreds of Serb civilians in the targeted region. After the operation Prinz Eugen division attacked Mihailovićs Chetniks in region of Gornji Milanovac and Čačak.

== Background ==
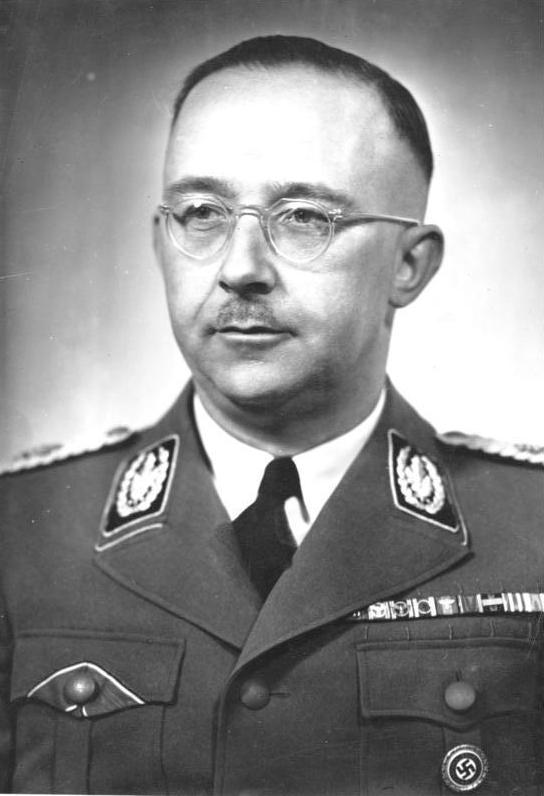
Heinrich Himmler, the highest ranked German officer who visited occupied Serbia during WWII

According to Heinrich Himmler, the annihilation of Mihailović and his forces was a basis for a success in Serbia and South East Europe. This operation was part of larger plan of Axis forces to disarm Chetnik units. The Military Commander in Serbia prepared a list of 24 Chetnik officers to be arrested by SS Prinz Eugen Division, one of them being Keserović. Keserović was probably the most active commander of Mihailović's Chetniks in Serbia.

Operation Kopaonik was aimed against the insurgent Chetnik units in Central Serbia under command of Major Dragutin Keserović in the region around Kriva Reka on the Kopaonik mountains. The operation was aimed against these forces because they were considered as the center of organized guerilla rebel forces in Central Serbia. The operation was in fact a punitive expedition aimed against Mihailović's Chetniks who were the chief target of the German command who wanted to secure its control of Serbia before important battles in North Africa.

The outline of the operation was prepared on 30 September and the order for its execution was issued on 5 October 1942.

== Forces ==
The Axis forces in Operation Kopaonik consisted of 7th SS Volunteer Mountain Division Prinz Eugen and several battalions of the Bulgarian 9th Infantry Division. According to some sources the Bulgarian forces included the 36th Infantry Regiment. This operation was the first large-scale engagement of the 7th SS Volunteer Mountain Division Prinz Eugen under command of Artur Phleps who personally commanded the Axis forces during Operation Kopaonik. The SS division had three regiments, two infantry and one artillery regiment. One of those two regiments that participated in Operation Kopaonik was 14th SS Infangry Regiment with total number of soldiers, together with supporting artillery regiment, of up to 6,000 men (according to Schmidhuber). The German forces were also supported by the Russian Protective Corps. The commander of the 14th SS Infantry Regiment was August Schmidhuber while its three battalions were commanded by Richard Kaaserer, Wagner and Landverer. Several Bulgarian battalions consisting of 1,000 men and Russian Protective Corps with 300 men also participated in this operation. The commander of Bulgarian forces that participated in the operation was Petar Panev.

The attacked Yugoslav rebel forces of Draža Mihailović were organized into Rasina Corps under command of Major Dragutin Keserović. In May 1942 Mihailović ordered to Keserović to prepare for receiving military supplies from Allies through air transport. Starting in the half of 1942, Allied airplanes supplied with arms and other military equipment to Chetnik detachment on Kopaonik. The Axis forces were informed that the headquarters of this Chetnik unit was in village Kriva Reka and that a British military mission was with them. In August 1942 joint Axis forces of German and Bulgarian troops attacked Chetniks of Major Keserović on Kopaonik and captured 9 members of his headquarter, three of them being members of British mission, executed when they were leaving village Kriva Reka.

== Course of the operation ==
Operation Kopaonik began on 11 October 1942 when the 1st battalion advanced toward Chetnik forces in Kriva Reka from Kosovska Mitrovica, the 2nd battalion advanced from Raška and parts of the 3rd battalion advanced from Novi Pazar. The Bulgarian battalions advanced from Brus and Aleksandrovac.

On 12 October 1942 the Axis troops completely encircled the village of Kriva Reka. They stormed into this village as they were informed that the headquarters of Rasina Corps of Keserović and Chetniks under his command were in the village.

Keserović was informed about the attack of Axis forces and successfully retreated units of his detachment.

Himmler was pleased with the Prince Eugen Division and visited it for three days as soon as Operation Kopaonik ended. After the operation was finished, on 18 October Himmler arrived to Kraljevo and celebrated birthday of Prince Eugene of Savoy together with members of SS Division that bore his name.

In his order issued for this operation on 5 October 1942, the commander of Axis forces in this operation, Arthur Phleps, ordered to his units to consider entire population of the region as rebel sympathizers. When Axis forces failed to capture and destroy Chetniks in Kriva Reka, they punished the village and burned all houses in the village. The Axis troops captured civilians who lived in the village and took them to the village church and blow it up. There were 46 men, women and children who were killed in the destroyed church. This massacre was committed against the order of the Captain Kaaserer. The number of murdered civilians in Kriva Reka was more than 300. The total number of civilians murdered during this operation is 690.

During the second half of October 1942 Prinz Eugen Division attacked Mihailovićs Chetniks in Gornji Milanovac and Čačak. At that time, General Mihailović was with his Supreme Command in Montenegro, which was under Italian occupation. From the beginning of 1943, General Mihailović prepared his units for the supports of Allied landing on the Adriatic coast. General Mihailović hoped that the Western Alliance would open the Second Front in the Balkans.

== Aftermath and legacy ==
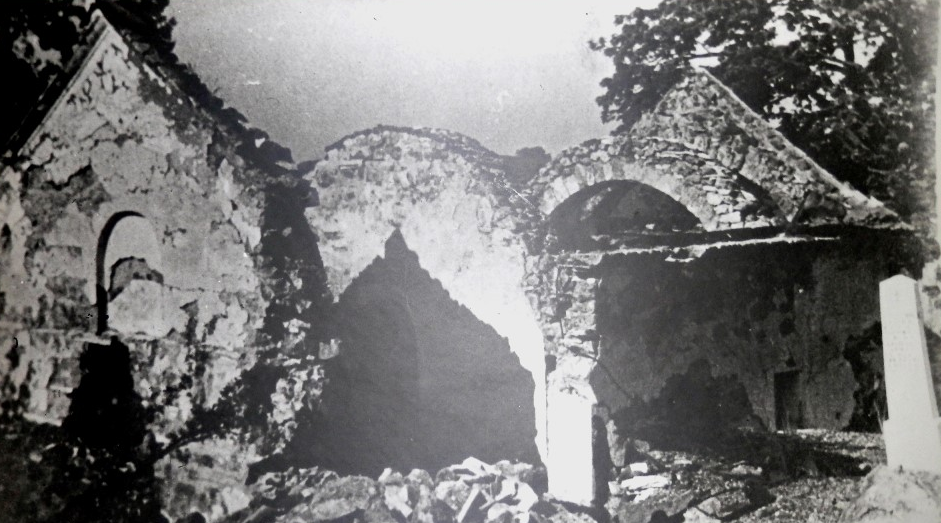
Church in Kriva Reka after the explosion

After being informed about massacre of civilian population, the German military commander of Serbia Paul Bader requested from the commander of SS division to refrain from killing civilians and burning villages without particular reason in future. Because of the conduct during Operation Kopaonik which included the mass murder of civilians in Kriva Reka, the commander of the 1st battalion Richard Kaaserer was dismissed from the SS, though he was quickly assigned to another German unit and swiftly promoted. Kaaserer was captured after the war in Norway, with forged documents under a false name. He was extradited to Yugoslavia, tried for war crimes, including those in Kriva Reka, sentenced to death and hanged in Belgrade in January 1947.

The tragedy of Kriva Reka inspired author Dobrica Ćosić to describe the terrible deaths of imprisoned villagers in their church in his book Deobe. In 2017 editor Goran Erčević recorded a documentary "Cry of Empty Cradle" (Serbian: Плач празне колевке) inspired with massacre of civilians in Kriva Reka, while poet and writer Goran Minić wrote a book about it.

== Sources ==
- Kumm, Otto (1978). Vorwärts, Prinz Eugen!: Geschichte d. 7. SS-Freiwilligen-Division "Prinz Eugen". Munin. ISBN 978-3-921242-34-6.
- Karchmar, Lucien (1973). Draz̆a Mihailović and the Rise of the C̆etnik Movement, 1941-1942. Department of History, Stanford University.
- Glišić, Venceslav (1970). Teror i zločini nacističke Nemačke u Srbiji 1941-1944. Rad.
- Ailsby, Christopher (June 2004). Hitler's renegades: foreign nationals in the service of the Third Reich. Spellmount. ISBN 9781862272477.
- Schmider, Klaus (2002). Partisanenkrieg in Jugoslawien 1941-1944. Mittler. ISBN 978-3-8132-0794-1.
- Oktorino, Nino (22 June 2015). Konflik Bersejarah : Vorwarts Jager!. Elex Media Komputindo. ISBN 978-602-02-6765-4.
- Kaltenegger, Roland (2008). Totenkopf und Edelweiss: General Artur Phleps und die südosteuropäischen Gebirgsverbände der Waffen-SS im Partisanenkampf auf dem Balkan 1942-1945. Ares Verlag. ISBN 978-3-902475-57-2.
- Milosavljević, Krsta (1969). Tamo gde je Slobodište. Savez udruženja boraca narodnooslobodilačkog rata SR Srbije.
- Kovbasko, Budimka (1971). Kriva reka: (kopaonička). Istorijski arhiv; Brue, Zajodnica kulture.
- Borković, Milan (1976). Србија у рату и револуцији: 1941-1945. Српска књижевна задруга, Институт за историју радничког покрета Србије.
- Basta, Milan (1986). Rat je završen 7 dana kasnije. OOUR.
- Avramov, Smilja (1995). Genocide in Yugoslavia. BIGZ. ISBN 9788613007982.
- Djordjević, Dimitrije (1997). Scars and Memory: Four Lives in One Lifetime. East European Monographs. ISBN 978-0-88033-368-9.
- Popović, Jovo (1986). Vješala za generale. Stvarnost. ISBN 9788670750548.
- Jovanović, Žarko S. (2001). Neostvareni ratni ciljevi Draže Mihailovića u Srbiji 1941-1945. Institut za noviju istoriju Srbije. ISBN 9788670050242.
- Černý, Adolf (2004). Slovanský přehled. Knihtiskárna F. Šimáček.
