= Veliki Kupci =

- Village
- Location within Serbia
- Coordinates: 43°27′N 21°14′E
- Country: Serbia
- Time zone: UTC+1 (CET)
  - Summer (DST): UTC+2 (CEST)

Veliki Kupci (Serbian: Велики Купци) is a village in the city of Kruševac, Rasinski county, Serbia, located at 15 km from Kruševac on route to Kopaonik mountain. Veliki Kupci and Mali Kupci are two parts of the same settlement separated by the river Rasina.

According to 2002 census, there were 1,035 people living in Veliki Kupci, almost entirely Serbs. The younger and middle-aged population mostly commute to Kruševac.

Until 1965, the settlement was the administrative center of Veliki Kupci municipality which included the following settlements: Celije, Gornji Stepos, Grkljane, Jablanica, Majdevo, Malli Kupci, Naupare, Sebecevac, Suvaja, Savrane, Sogolj and Vitanovac. After that, all these settlements became part of the administrative municipality of Kruševac.

The following institutions exist in Veliki Kupci:

- "Knez Lazar" elementary school, gathering school children from Veliki Kupci, Mali Kupci, Sebecevac, Stitare, Grkljane, Majdevo, Suvaja and Celije;

- Health care institution with laboratory and dentist office;

- Pharmacy;

- Post office;

- Youth center;

- Registry.

There is also 'Heritage Museum' dedicated to old crafts, as well as a football and basketball court.

Additionally, there are several hospitality facilities and gas stations.

Agriculture is the primary industry in this area of Rasina District, and the main cultures are corn, wheat, all vegetables, plum, apples, blackberries and strawberries.

== Geography ==
The settlement is located in the valley of the river Rasina which passes through Veliki Kupci. The lake of Celije is located at c. 6 km from Veliki Kupci, and the mountains of Jastrebac and Kopaonik are both at less than 40 km away.
