= Kriva Reka, Brus =

Kriva Reka Крива Река
- Village
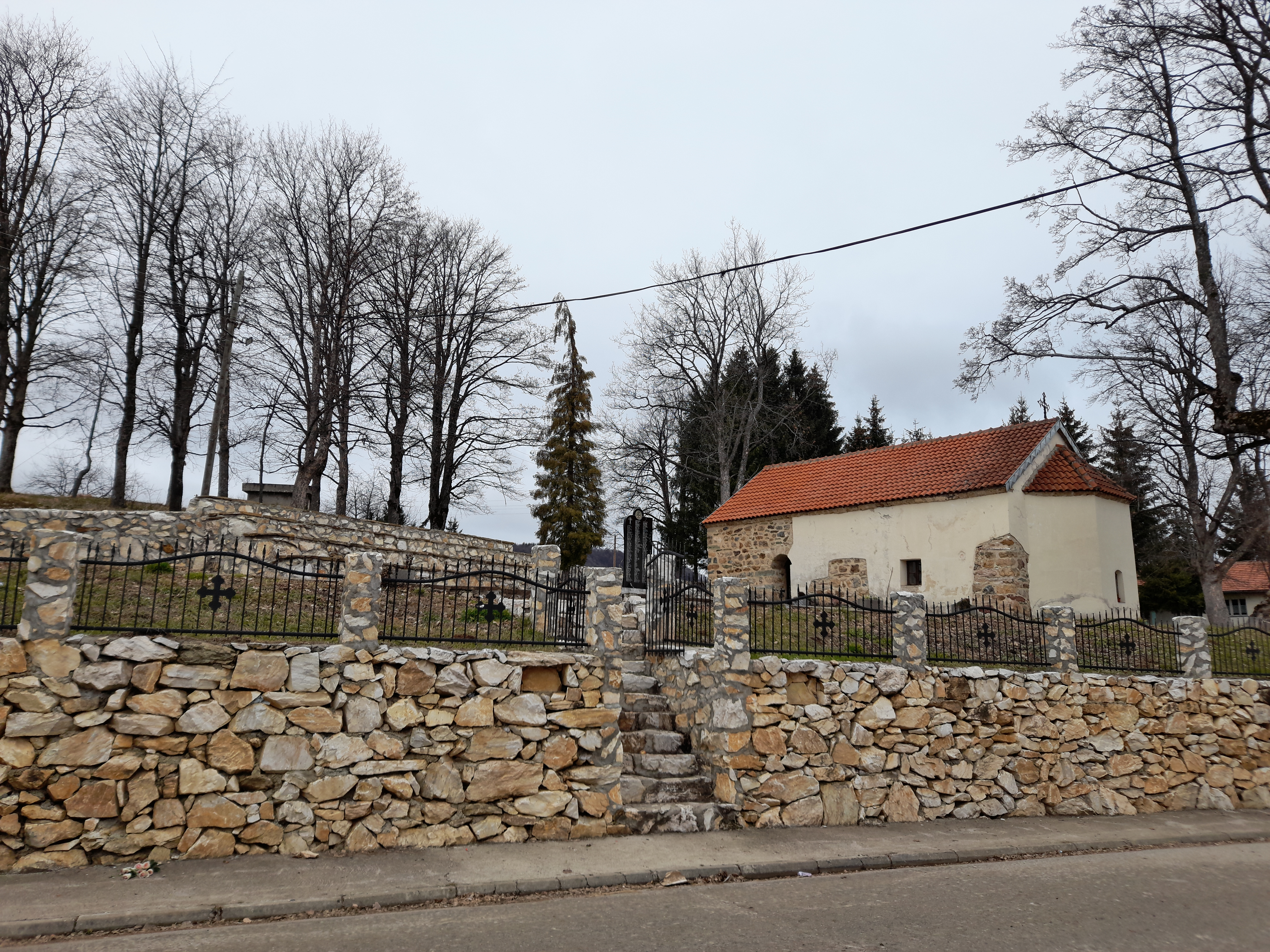
- Church of the Holy Apostles Peter and Paul

- Location within Serbia
- Coordinates: 43°22′N 20°52′E
- Country: Serbia
- District: Rasina District
- Municipality: Brus
- Time zone: UTC+1 (CET)
  - Summer (DST): UTC+2 (CEST)

Kriva Reka (Serbian Cyrillic: Крива Река) is a village in the municipality of Brus, Serbia. According to the 2002 census, the village has a population of 519 people.

== Infrastracture ==
The village contains a church dedicated to Saints Peter and Paul built in 1618.

== History ==
In 1942, during the German occupation of Serbia, the German occupiers, in a punitive expedition, imprisoned dozens of local men, women and children in the church, after which they blew it up with the people still inside.

Since 1979 the church is under the protection of the Republic of Serbia, as a cultural monument of great importance.
