= Predrag Raković =

Yugoslav military officer

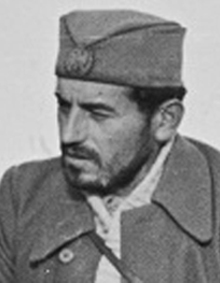
- Raković c. 1942
- Born: 10 June 1912; Prijevor, Kingdom of Serbia
- Died: 15 December 1944 (aged 32); Miokovci, Yugoslavia
- Military career
- Allegiance: Kingdom of Yugoslavia; Chetniks
- Rank: Major
- Commands: 2nd Ravna Gora Corps
- Conflicts: Siege of Kraljevo

Predrag Raković (Serbo-Croatian Cyrillic: Предраг Раковић; 10 June 1912 – 15 December 1944) was a Yugoslav military officer who joined the Chetnik forces of Draža Mihailović after the Axis invasion of Yugoslavia in April 1941 during World War II. He became commander of the Chetnik 2nd Ravna Gora Corps and collaborated with the German-installed puppet government in the German-occupied territory of Serbia and later directly with the Germans against the rival communist-led Yugoslav Partisans. His forces briefly cooperated with Soviet forces against the Germans in October 1944, but faced with Soviet demands that they lay down their weapons or join the Partisans, they withdrew from occupied Serbia.

== Early life and career ==
Predrag Raković was born on 10 June 1912 in the village of Prijevor, near Čačak in the Kingdom of Serbia. He was one of five sons of Milosav and Milorada Raković. Serbia became part of the Kingdom of Serbs, Croats and Slovenes (Yugoslavia from 1929) in 1918. When he completed his primary schooling he attended gymnasium in Čačak. According to his army record, while at gymnasium he clashed with fellow students who had communist leanings. Following graduation from gymnasium, he successfully applied to become a cadet at the lower school of the Royal Yugoslav Army's Quartermaster Academy, commencing on 1 October 1933. He progressed through enlisted ranks while at the academy, and was commissioned as a quartermaster lieutenant (poručnik) on 1 October 1936. Later that month he was assigned to the army warehouse at Osijek (now in Croatia). His duties included supervising the heating, lighting and meeting of the supply needs of the Osijek garrison, and he also managed army funds allocated for that purpose. He was later reassigned to a post in Škofja Loka (now in Slovenia) where the building of fortifications along the northern Yugoslav border were being coordinated, and from 29 November 1939 was posted to the 42nd Infantry Regiment in Bjelovar (now in Croatia).

== World War II ==
=== Invasion of Yugoslavia ===
Yugoslav mobilisation plans saw the 42nd Infantry Regiment being a constituent formation of the 40th Infantry Division Slavonska, which was to be formed at the time of mobilisation from the Osijek divisional district. After pressure from Adolf Hitler, Yugoslavia signed the Tripartite Pact on 25 March 1941. Two days later, a coup d'état overthrew the government. A general mobilisation was not called by the new government until 3 April 1941, out of fear of further offending Hitler and thus precipitating war. However, on the same day as the coup Hitler had ordered an invasion, which was to commence on 6 April. When the invasion began, two battalions of the 42nd Infantry Regiment were marching towards their defensive positions, while the rest of the unit was still mobilising in Bjelovar and was unable to move due to lack of draught animals. The battalions that were deploying had no artillery support because the divisional artillery regiment did not complete its mobilisation. The Croatian nationalist Ustaše sabotaged the Yugoslav radio network and conducted fifth column activities, and this hampered the mobilisation and deployment of the 42nd Infantry Regiment and the rest of the division.

On 7 April, the 42nd Infantry Regiment had to take over the entire frontage of the division after the Croat members of the 108th Infantry Regiment – responsible for the right sector – revolted and arrested the Serb officers and soldiers and marched back to Bjelovar. The following day, the two understrength and wavering battalions of the 42nd Infantry Regiment arrived at Pčelić, 15 kilometres (9.3 mi) southwest of Virovitica, where the Germans had crossed the Drava river. By 9 April, the remaining Croat troops were also deserting or turning on their commanders, and almost all the troops remaining on the frontline were Serbs. Soon after dawn the following day, the Germans launched a thrust against the remnants of the 42nd Infantry Regiment, and the troops were either captured or fled into the hills to the south.

=== Uprising in Serbia ===
When Yugoslavia surrendered on 17 April, Raković was one of the regular and reserve officers who refused to surrender or managed to escape capture by the Germans and made their way to Ravna Gora, a highland area near Suvobor mountain in the central area of what became the German-occupied territory of Serbia. There they joined the nascent Chetnik guerilla movement led by Colonel Draža Mihailović. The main activities of the Chetniks from mid-May to August were identifying what manpower might be available to the movement, recruiting those willing to commit immediately, and drawing up lists of those who might be mobilised in future, as well as collecting arms, ammunition and supplies and establishing caches. Mihailović and his inner circle also planned a resistance strategy, which centred around building up strength but postponing armed operations against the occupiers until the Allies landed and pushed them out of the country. In early July, Raković formed the Prijevor Chetnik Detachment in his native village. Around the same time, a Communist-led uprising broke out in the occupied territory. Within a few weeks the Partisan revolt had reached mass proportions, and it grew in intensity throughout August.

In August, following an abortive attempt on Mihailović's life, Raković became aware he was suspected of involvement in the attempted assassination. He travelled to Ravna Gora and convinced Dragiša Vasić – Mihailović's close advisor, who was heading the investigation – that he was not involved. Meanwhile, pressure was building on Mihailović and his movement to join the uprising. By mid-September, some Chetnik detachments were conducting independent or combined operations with the Partisans against the Germans and the Serbian collaborationist forces of Milan Nedić's Government of National Salvation. Despite this, Mihailović did not fully commit to the uprising. In an indication that Raković retained the trust of Mihailović, in September his responsibilities were expanded to the Chetnik forces in the nearby village of Ljubić.

The main fighting that Raković and his detachment participated in during the uprising was the capture of Čačak on 1 October, when they were responsible for the assault from the northwest of the town. In the face of the brutal German counterinsurgency response, Operation Uzice – which had been launched in late September – disagreements between the Partisans and Chetniks were exacerbated by German reprisal massacres of civilians in Kraljevo and Kragujevac. Mihailović and the Partisan leader Josip Broz Tito met on 27 October but could not agree on whether the uprising should be continued, with Tito urging that the revolt be continued regardless of the consequences and Mihailović trying to impose his wait-and-see approach. Around the time of this meeting, Mihailović contacted the Germans and offered to help them against the Partisans, having realised that they were the greatest threat to his movement. Three days after the meeting he ordered his Chetnik forces to attack the Partisans, and this was carried out on 1 November. The Partisans successfully repelled the Chetnik assault and counter-attacked; at the end of two weeks of fierce fighting they surrounded Mihailović's headquarters at Ravna Gora but were reluctant to continue due to Tito's perception that the Soviet Union would disapprove. The Germans then launched their final push to eliminate the Partisan-held territory known as the Republic of Užice.

Despite some half-hearted attempts at reconciliation, the split between the Chetniks and Partisans was permanent. The Germans did not trust Mihailović and during the latter stages of Operation Uzice and the almost complete defeat and expulsion of the Partisans from the occupied territory in early December they quickly launched Operation Mihailovic and dispersed the Chetnik headquarters at Ravna Gora, although Mihailović narrowly escaped. Mihailović had been in contact with Nedić's puppet government since late August, and in mid-November he had encouraged Chetnik detachments to cooperate with the quisling forces against the Partisans. One of the seven detachments that definitely took this course of action was that of Raković, which declared itself willing to accept Nedić's command and fought against the Partisans from late November.

=== Legalisation ===
In night of 30-31 November 1941 Raković with his 200 men met with 5th Serbian Volunteer Detachment of Marisav Petrović in village of Gornje Gorevnice. Raković met commander of all Serbian Volunteer Detachments Kosta Mušicki in Čačak in the evening of November 31. On 1 or 2 December 1941 Raković and his detachment reported to the Germans. They then competed with the Serbian Volunteer Detachments – the paramilitary arm of Dimitrije Ljotić's pre-war fascist Yugoslav National Movement Zbor, that was part of the puppet regime's forces – in assisting with the capture of remaining Partisans. They also provided assistance to Chetnik detachments that had not been legalised. Raković's legalised detachment was known as the Ljubić Detachment "Tanasko Rajić" and numbered 400 Chetniks. In a report to Mihailović he wrote that destruction of communists is aim of both Chetniks, as well as Germans and Ljotić's men, so in this 'job' we became 'allies'. In last two months of 1941 Chetniks in Čačak killed 166 captured Partisans and their sympathisers outside combat. Number of Partisans captured and handed to Germans in same region during late 1941 and early 1942 was at least 430.

In April 1942, all legalised Chetnik detachments such as Raković's were placed under the direct command of the German Army occupation divisions, with their activity strictly controlled by the German occupation authorities. They were assigned areas of responsibility and were not permitted to move without German authority, all operations had to be cleared in advance with the local German area or district command, a German liaison officer had to be present with them when they were engaged in operations, and the Germans directly controlled their ammunition supply. At the end of 1942, almost all legalised Chetnik detachments were disarmed as the Germans considered them unreliable and of little fighting value. This included Raković's detachment, although not all of his Chetniks responded to the German orders and those that did, did not return to illegality under his command. Many of those that did report were sent to Germany as forced labourers.

During its period of legalisation, Raković's detachment sometimes clashed with Serbian Volunteer Corps in its area of responsibility. At the end of May 1942 Raković organised an attack on the detachment of Serbian Volunteer Corps commander Budimir Nikić and his associates, wounding Nikić and killing four of his companions near Čačak. At the end of the following month, Dragutin Bulić, a Serbian Orthodox Church priest and member of the Serbian Volunteer Corps, was attacked and killed at the market in Čačak.

=== Further collaboration and death ===
About the time that Raković and his detachment returned to illegality, the Chetnik forces were re-organised into corps on a territorial basis, and Raković was placed in command of the 2nd Ravna Gora Corps covering the villages of Ljubić, Trnava and Žička, all in the Čačak district. When it was established, the corps had five brigades. Despite being officially "illegal", Raković maintained contacts with the Germans, and agreed to continue fighting against the remaining Partisans and not obstruct the requisition of food in the district, in return for arms, ammunition and other supplies. Raković maintained these links until the end of the German occupation in late 1944. His actions against the Partisans and their sympathisers in his area of responsibility included drawing up lists of people to be killed; the killings were mostly carried out at night using knives. An example of this terror can be seen during period between 17th of February and 22nd March 1943. troops under Raković's command killed 37 people in Čačak district, including 6 women. Ministry of Interior of quisling government from April notes that anti-partisan actions of certain Chetniks units, including those under Raković's command, kill anyone who has collaborated with partisans and that mindlessness of their actions makes them indistinguishable from common outlaws.

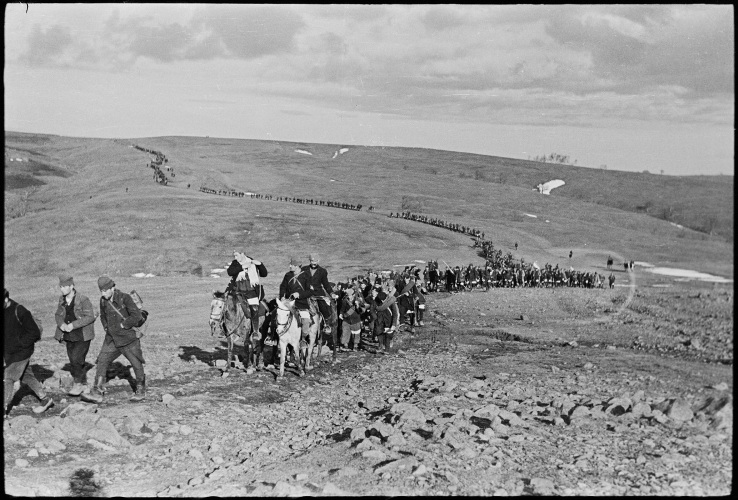
On Mihailović 's orders, Raković's 2nd Ravna Gora Corps marched across the Pešter plateau on their march to assist beleaguered Chetnik forces in the Italian governorate of Montenegro

Chetnik forces participated on the Axis side during the largest counterinsurgency operation in occupied Yugoslavia – Case White – between January and March 1943 in the Independent State of Croatia. In the aftermath of their disastrous defeat during the Partisan breakout across the Neretva River, the Chetnik forces that had participated – along with their Italian allies – fell back into the Italian governorate of Montenegro and the adjacent Sandžak region and planned to hold the advancing Partisans between Nikšić on the Zeta River and Bijelo Polje on the Lim River. In mid-April Mihailović ordered the mobilisation and transport of Raković's corps over the 200 km (120 mi) from Čačak to Bijelo Polje to bolster the Chetnik defences. By the time they arrived on 7 May, along with the Rasina Corps of Dragutin Keserović, the Partisans had made further advances, and intelligence had been received about German intentions to enter Montenegro and disarm the Chetniks. As a result, Mihailović returned to the occupied territory of Serbia with the two corps, which numbered 2,000 troops. Mihailović issued a special order praising the men of the 2nd Ravna Gora Corps for responding quickly.

Soon after his return to Čačak, Raković acted as a go-between for Mihailović on one side and Nedić and Ljotić on the other during negotiations. During September 1943 Raković's Chetniks killed 3 and tortured 7 villagers from villages of Atenica and Kulinovci, as part of Chetnik terror against Partisan supporters.

The various Chetnik forces sometimes fought among themselves and treated their areas of responsibility as personal fiefdoms. For example during 1944, Raković and another Chetnik leader, Dragoslav Račić, shot Mihailović's Inspector of Chetnik Forces, Colonel Jevrem Simić, as he was on his way to Čačak. Raković also either personally killed Keserović's chief political advisor Mihailo Knežević or ordered him killed.

In April 1944, during the German-led Operation Kammerjäger, a counter to the Partisan divisions that had penetrated into the occupied territory of Serbia, Raković's Chetniks were soundly defeated by Partisan forces. Later that month, Raković – who was one of the principal Chetnik links with the Nedić puppet regime and the Germans – met in Čačak with German officer, Obersturmführer Biermann, the head of the Sicherheitsdienst (the SS security service) in the occupied territory, and told him that his authority to represent Mihailović had been withdrawn. This implied that Mihailović was aware of Raković's collaboration, and that he was aware of the collaboration agreement Raković had previously with the Germans. In mid-August Raković went to Belgrade to meet with commander of Ljotićevci, General Kosta Mušicki, who promised Raković that he would support his forces with one truck, arms and uniforms.

According to pro-partisan sources, on 28 November 1944, Raković held a meeting with Partisans in village Brđani near Gornji Milanovac. Partisans allowed Chetnik soldiers to either leave for their homes or join Partisans, however commanding officers would have to surrender to Partisans and be tried after the war. Chetniks rejected the last condition, which ended the negotiations. In late December 1944, Raković and a few of his men were surrounded in a village in western Serbia by Partisan forces. Using a ruse, his men were induced to surrender, but Raković killed himself. On his body were found the radio codes he had been using to communicate with Mihailović. These codes were then used to initiate fake traffic with Mihailović about Chetnik strength in the country to encourage him to remain in Yugoslavia so that he could be captured and tried.
