= Kosta Mušicki =

Yugoslav military officer (1897–1946)

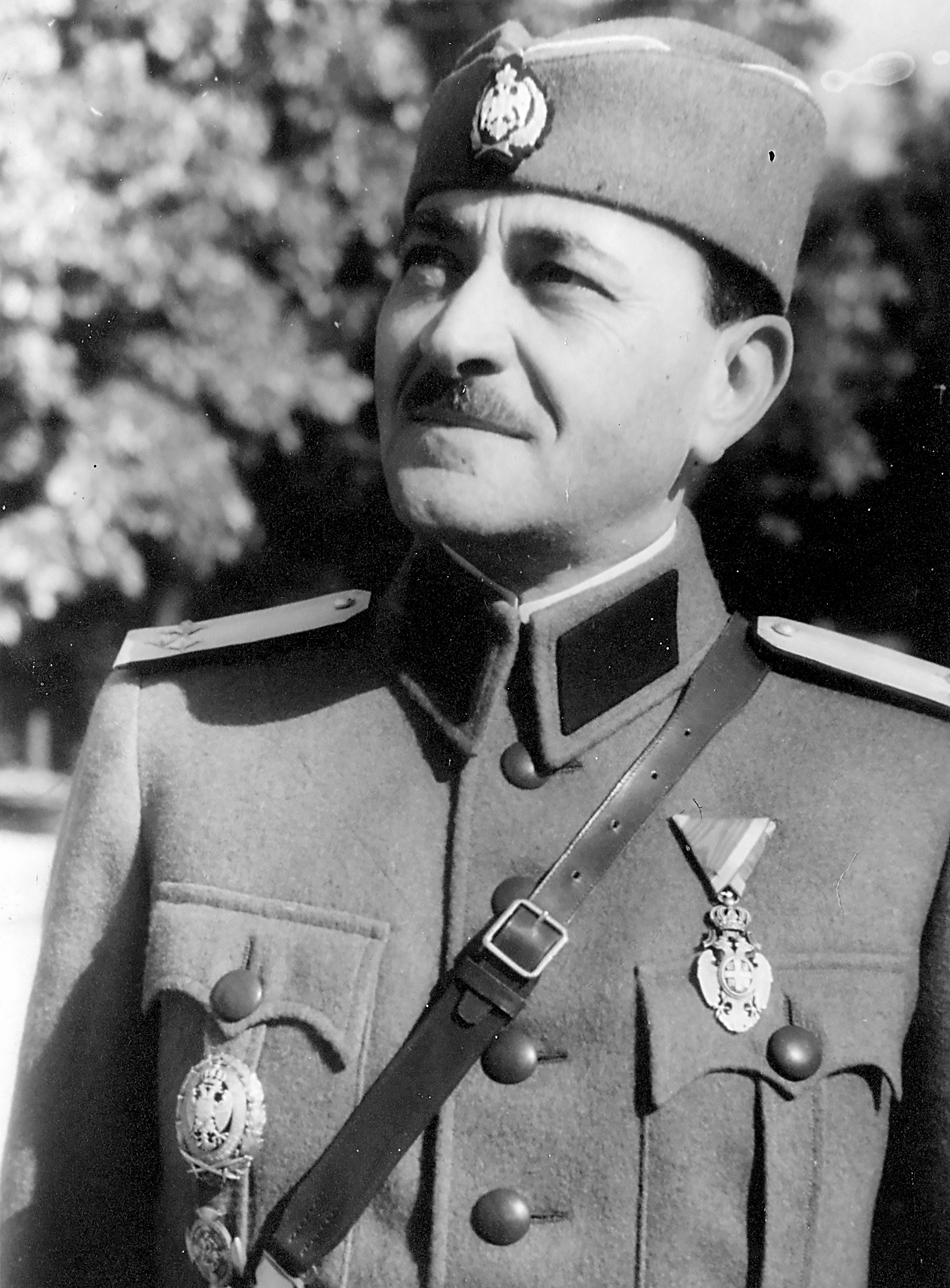
- Born: Konstantin Mušicki; 7 April 1897; Slavonski Brod, Croatia-Slavonia, Austria-Hungary
- Died: 17 July 1946 (aged 49); Belgrade, PR Serbia, Federal People's Republic of Yugoslavia
- Military career
- Allegiance: Austria-Hungary Kingdom of Serbia Kingdom of Yugoslavia Independent State of Croatia Government of National Salvation Chetniks
- Service years: 1914–1945
- Rank: Brigadier general
- Nickname: Kosta
- Commands: Serbian Volunteer Corps
- Conflicts: World War II in Yugoslavia

Konstantin Mušicki (Serbian Cyrillic: Константин Коста Мушицки; 7 April 1897 – 17 July 1946) was a Yugoslav brigadier general who commanded the collaborationist Serbian Volunteer Corps during World War II. He was captured by the British Army at the end of the war, but was subsequently handed over to the Yugoslav authorities, who tried and executed him for war crimes.

== Early life ==
Kosta Mušicki was born on 7 April 1897 in Slavonski Brod, Austria-Hungary (now in Croatia) to Milutin and Jelena Mušicki (née Mihailović). An ethnic Serb, he began his military service in the Austro-Hungarian Army. He later married and had two children. During the interwar period, Mušicki served as an aide to King Alexander and Queen Maria. He joined the fascist Yugoslav National Movement (Serbian: Југословенски народни покрет, Збор, Jugoslovenski narodni pokret, Zbor) following the king's assassination in 1934.

== World War II ==
Mušicki was stationed in Slavonski Brod at the time of the Axis invasion of Yugoslavia in April 1941 and served as the Royal Yugoslav Army commander responsible for the railroad between Belgrade and Zagreb in the rank of colonel. He demonstrated his support for the Germans by helping their forces during the invasion. Yugoslavia was quickly conquered by the Axis powers and Mušicki remained in Slavonski Brod for several months after the conquest. He attempted to join the Ustaše Militia there, but was rejected. He went to Belgrade in mid-August, where he was received by Zbor leader Dimitrije Ljotić. On 6 October, Milan Nedić, the Prime Minister of the Axis-installed puppet Government of National Salvation, appointed Mušicki to lead the Serbian Volunteer Command (Serbian: Srpska dobrovoljačka komanda, SDK). In the evening of November 31, 1941 Chetnik commander Predrag Raković met with Mušicki in Čačak. Mušicki was in charge of forces of quisling government in destroying remnants of Yugoslav Partisans in western Serbia, following suppression of Uprising in Serbia. After the meeting, Raković wrote a report to Chetnik leader Draža Mihailović that destruction of communists was goal of both Chetniks, as well as Germans and Ljotić's men, so they became allies in this job. Mušicki was involved in executing Serb civilians in the town of Čačak in December 1941. He and Milan Aćimović contacted Draža Mihailović on 5 December, possibly in an effort to warn him in advance of the assault the Germans had planned, codenamed Operation Mihailovic. This action prompted the Germans to question Mušicki's loyalty. He was removed from command at the end of 1941 and imprisoned by the Germans, but was later freed at Nedić's intervention.

In early 1943, the Serbian Volunteer Command was renamed the Serbian Volunteer Corps (Serbian: Srpski dobrovoljački korpus, SDK), and placed under the direct command of General der Artillerie Paul Bader, the commanding general in Serbia. The SDK was not part of the SS, nor was it formally a part of the Wehrmacht. It was fed and clothed to German standards, with these expenses reimbursed to the Germans by the puppet government, who also paid the troops at the same rates as the Serbian police. The service oath of this latter SDK was amended to state that the members of the SDK would fight, to the death if necessary, both the Yugoslav Partisans and the Chetniks. Neither organisation was able to infiltrate the SDK due to its indoctrination with the ideas of Ljotić. Mušicki was re-appointed as its commander in the rank of general. The SDK was the only Serbian armed force that the Germans trusted during the war, and its units were often praised by German commanders for their bravery in combat. Mušicki attempted to flee Yugoslavia towards the end of the war, but was captured by the British. He was extradited to Yugoslavia and placed on trial. At his trial, he gave testimony about the involvement of Serbian volunteers in the Kragujevac massacre. He was found guilty of collaborating with the Germans, sentenced to death, and was executed by firing squad in Belgrade on 17 July 1946.
