= Ravna Gora (highland) =

Highland in central Serbia, birthplace of the Chetniks

Coordinates: 44°6′36″N 20°9′25″E

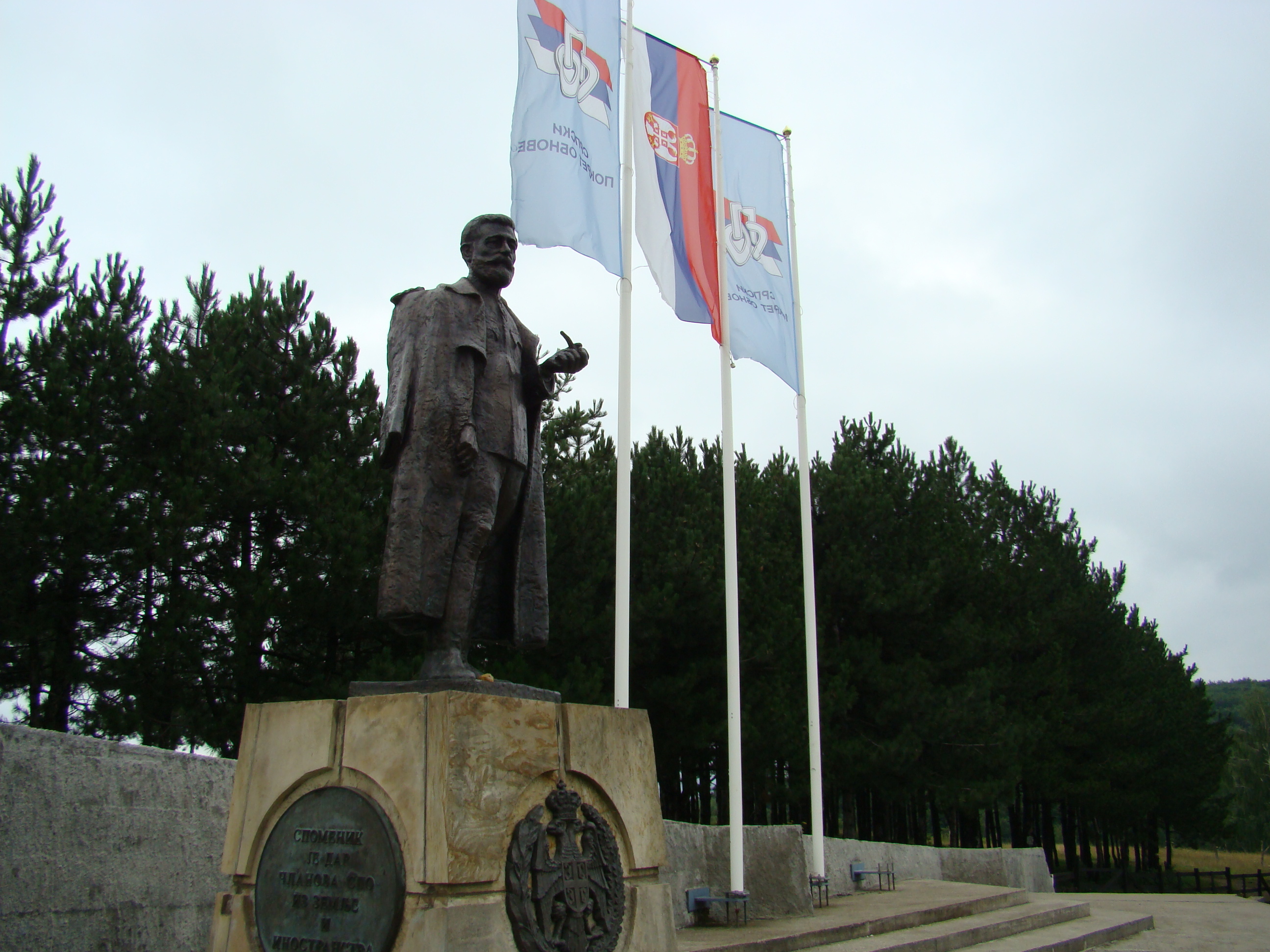
Monument to Draža Mihailović on Ravna Gora

Ravna Gora (Serbian Cyrillic: Равна Гора) is a highland in central Serbia, at the mountain of Suvobor. It is renowned as the birthplace of the modern Chetnik movement under the leadership of Draža Mihailović in 1941.

Ravna Gora was the site of a celebration marking the 50th anniversary of Victory Day in 1945. Among others, the celebration was attended by Richard Felman, one of more than 400 US airmen rescued by the Chetniks during World War II. During the war, over 2,300 total airmen were rescued from German-occupied Yugoslavia.
