= Drugovac =

- Village (Selo)
- Location within Serbia
- Coordinates: 44°32′45″N 20°49′55″E
- Country: Serbia
- District: Podunavlje District
- Municipality: Smederevo
- Elevation: 653 ft (199 m)

Population (2022)
  - Total: 1,302
- Time zone: UTC+1 (CET)
  - Summer (DST): UTC+2 (CEST)

Drugovac is a village in the municipality of Smederevo, Serbia. According to the 2021 census, the village has a population of 1,302 people.
