= Trnava (Čačak) =

Trnava Трнава
- Town
- Location within Serbia
- Coordinates: 43°51′16″N 20°23′17″E
- Country: Serbia
- District: Moravica District
- Municipality: Čačak

Area
  - Total: 15.40 km^{2} (5.95 sq mi)
- Elevation: 589 m (1,932 ft)

Population (2011)
  - Total: 2,913
  - Density: 189.2/km^{2} (489.9/sq mi)
- Time zone: UTC+1 (CET)
  - Summer (DST): UTC+2 (CEST)

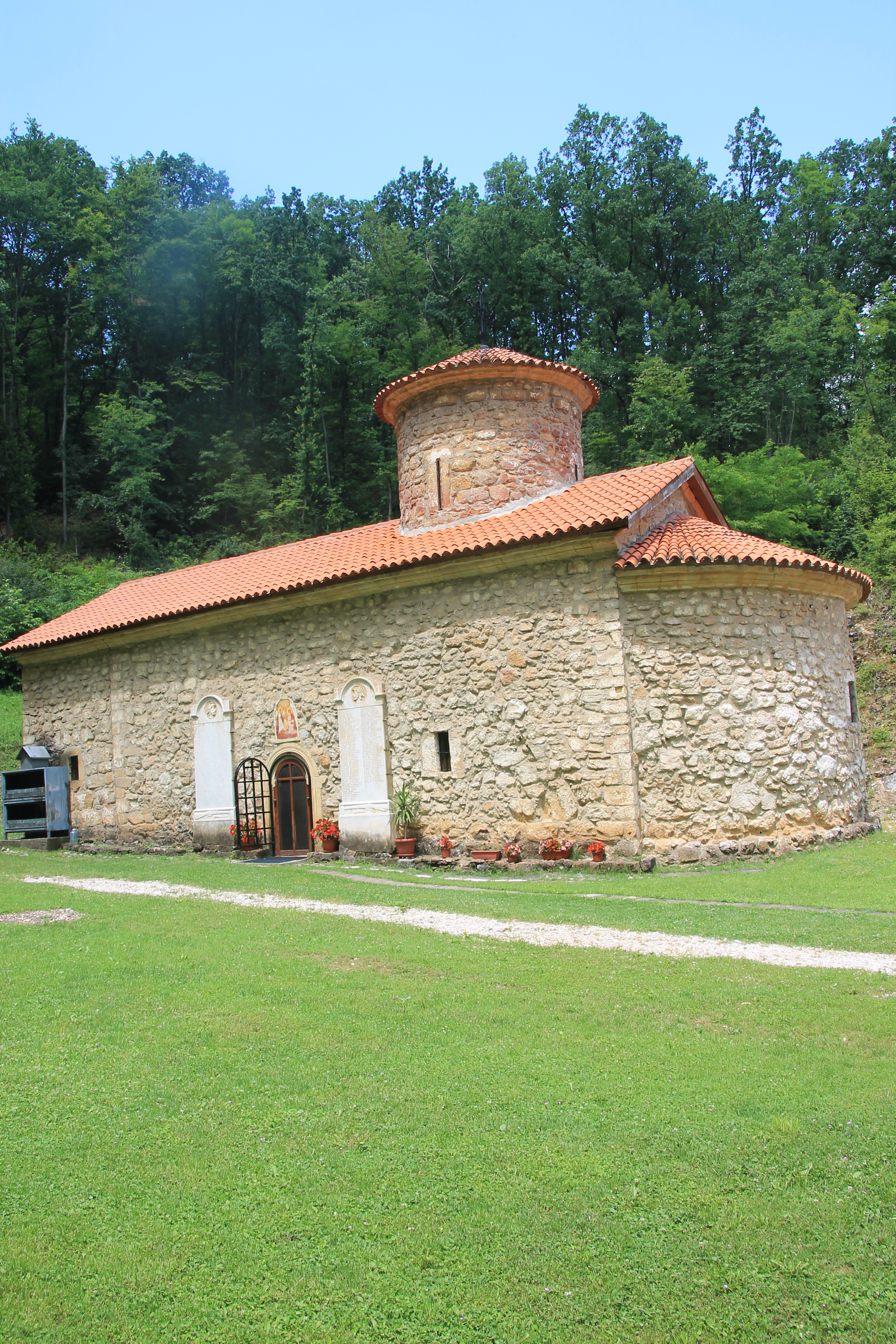

Trnava is a small town in the municipality of Čačak, Serbia. According to the 2011 census, the town has a population of 2,913 people.
