= Kopaonik =

Mountain range in Southeast Europe

- Копаоник, Kopaoniku
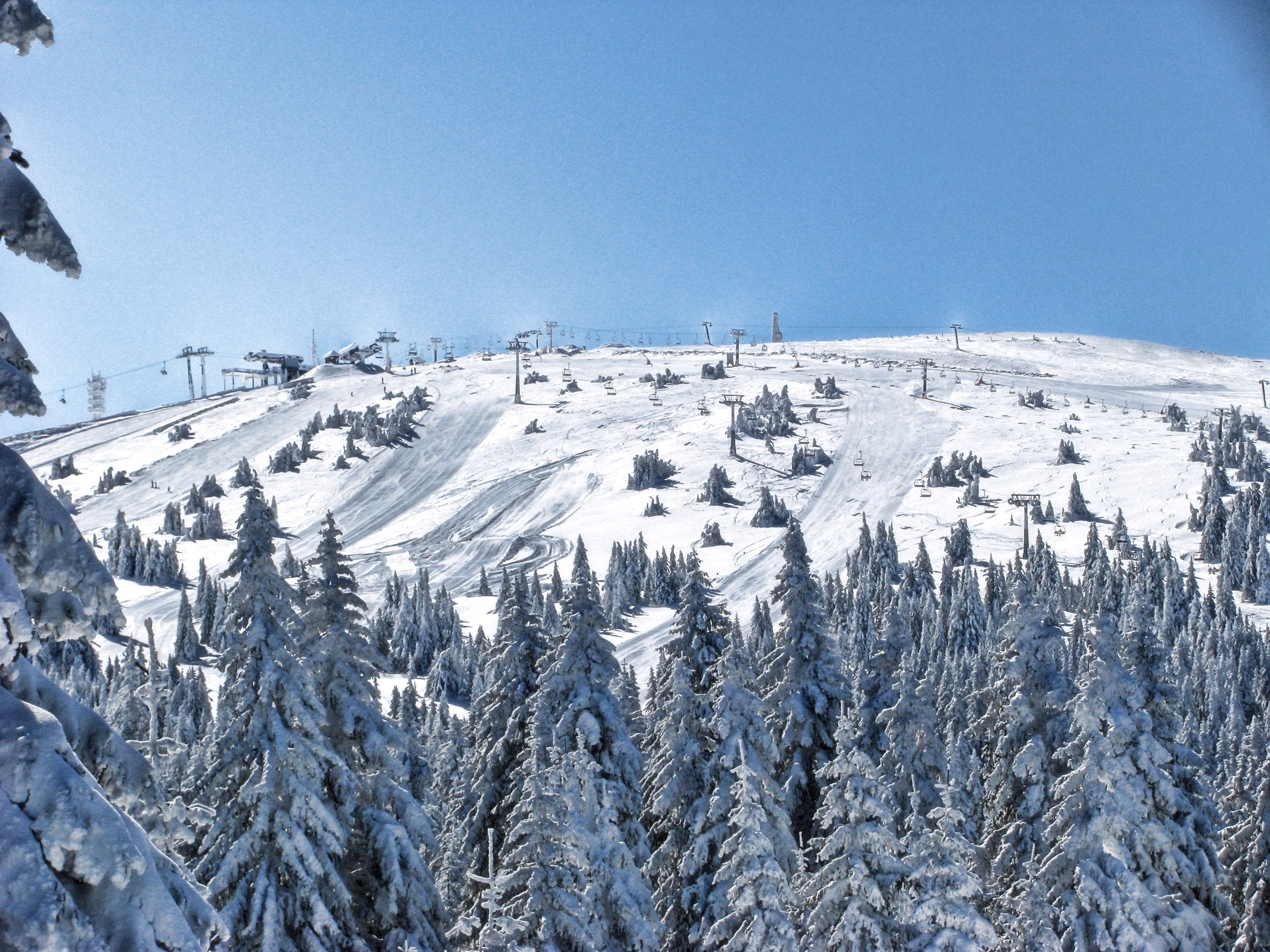
- Pančić's Peak, during winter

Highest point
- Peak: Pančić's Peak
- Elevation: 2,017 m (6,617 ft)
- Coordinates: 43°16′09″N 20°49′21″E

Geography
- Location within Serbia Location within Kosovo Location within Europe
- Countries: Serbia; Kosovo
- IUCN category II (national park)
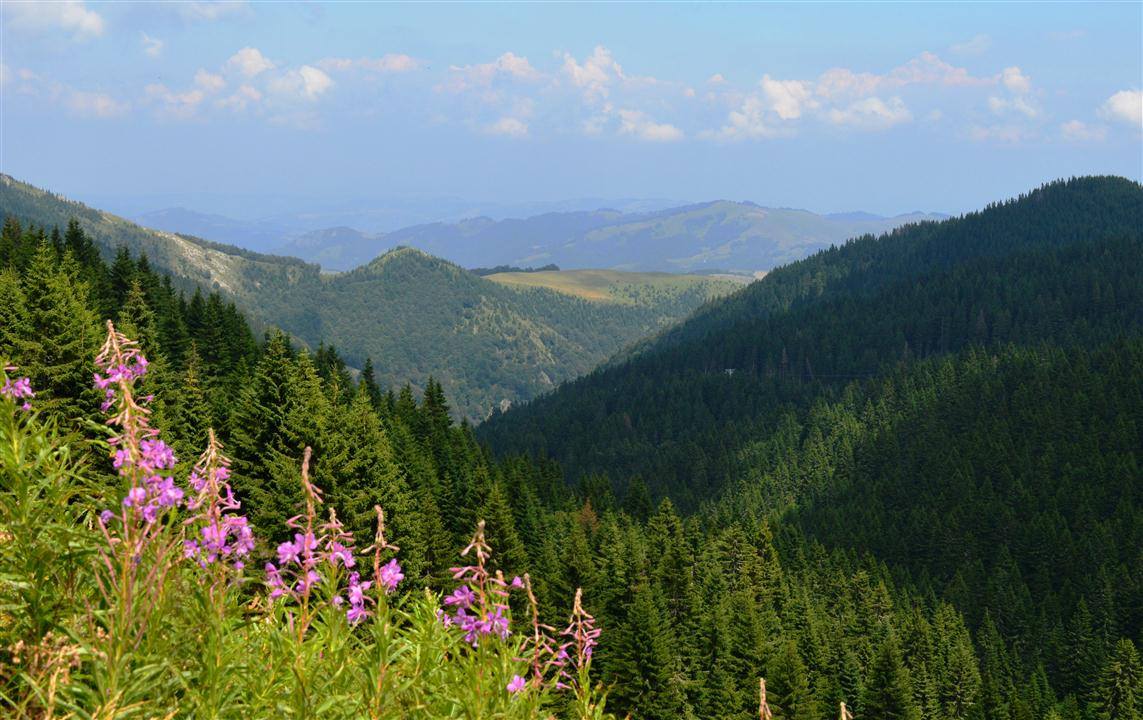
- Kopaonik National Park
- Area: 121.06 km^{2} (46.74 sq mi)
- Established: 1981

Kopaonik (Serbian Cyrillic: Копаоник; Albanian: Kopaoniku) is a mountain range located in Serbia and Kosovo. The highest point of this mountain range is the Pančić's Peak with an altitude of 2,017 m (6,617 ft). The central part of the Kopaonik plateau was declared a national park in 1981 which today covers an area of 121.06 km^{2} (46.74 sq mi).

On the slopes of the mountain range there is Kopaonik ski resort which is one of the largest in Southeastern Europe. There are 25 ski lifts with capacity of 32,000 skiers per hour.

== Geography ==
Kopaonik mountains stretch for around 75 km (47 mi) in the north–south direction. The mountain's southern border is in Kosovo, between the rivers of Llapi and Sitnica while, the northern boundary is set by the Jošanica river in Serbia. It belongs to the region of Raška in Serbia. The Kopaonik mountain massif (Kopaoničke planine) includes the mountains of Kopaonik, Željin, Goč and Stolovi. The Pančić's Peak, with 2,017 m (6,617 ft), is the highest point of the mountains.

=== Climate ===
Kopaonik has a subalpine climate (Köppen climate classification: Dfc) with fresh summers, and long, cold winters with abundant snowfall. The snow season lasts from November to April, while there are around 200 sunny days.

Climate data for Kopaonik (1991–2020 normals, extremes 1961–2020)
Month	Jan	Feb	Mar	Apr	May	Jun	Jul	Aug	Sep	Oct	Nov	Dec	Year
Record high °C (°F)	12.7 (54.9)	14.5 (58.1)	16.8 (62.2)	19.5 (67.1)	23.7 (74.7)	25.6 (78.1)	30.0 (86.0)	29.2 (84.6)	26.5 (79.7)	22.4 (72.3)	21.4 (70.5)	16.3 (61.3)	30.0 (86.0)
Mean daily maximum °C (°F)	−0.9 (30.4)	−0.7 (30.7)	2.0 (35.6)	6.4 (43.5)	11.5 (52.7)	15.4 (59.7)	17.6 (63.7)	18.2 (64.8)	13.3 (55.9)	9.5 (49.1)	4.8 (40.6)	0.3 (32.5)	8.1 (46.6)
Daily mean °C (°F)	−4.5 (23.9)	−4.3 (24.3)	−1.8 (28.8)	2.6 (36.7)	7.4 (45.3)	11.3 (52.3)	13.3 (55.9)	13.6 (56.5)	9.0 (48.2)	5.3 (41.5)	1.1 (34.0)	−3.2 (26.2)	4.1 (39.4)
Mean daily minimum °C (°F)	−7.5 (18.5)	−7.4 (18.7)	−5.0 (23.0)	−0.8 (30.6)	3.6 (38.5)	7.3 (45.1)	8.9 (48.0)	9.4 (48.9)	5.6 (42.1)	2.0 (35.6)	−1.8 (28.8)	−6.1 (21.0)	0.7 (33.3)
Record low °C (°F)	−24.8 (−12.6)	−24.2 (−11.6)	−23.7 (−10.7)	−15.2 (4.6)	−8.6 (16.5)	−4.5 (23.9)	−3.3 (26.1)	−1.3 (29.7)	−7.6 (18.3)	−12.5 (9.5)	−17.5 (0.5)	−24.6 (−12.3)	−24.8 (−12.6)
Average precipitation mm (inches)	67.1 (2.64)	65.2 (2.57)	84.6 (3.33)	94.1 (3.70)	120.9 (4.76)	108.6 (4.28)	97.6 (3.84)	76.7 (3.02)	90.2 (3.55)	82.0 (3.23)	75.1 (2.96)	78.0 (3.07)	1,040.1 (40.95)
Average precipitation days (≥ 0.1 mm)	15.9	15.9	17.0	16.5	17.1	14.6	12.4	10.5	12.4	12.2	12.7	15.8	173.0
Average snowy days	16.3	15.3	16.3	11.5	3.8	0.4	0.1	0.1	1.0	3.7	8.4	14.7	91.6
Average relative humidity (%)	82.9	83.3	82.4	80.0	80.5	79.1	76.1	74.4	81.3	81.0	81.9	84.0	80.6
Mean monthly sunshine hours	77.8	78.9	111.2	131.1	147.5	180.6	222.5	222.2	155.6	133.4	91.0	70.9	1,622.7
Percentage possible sunshine	27	27	31	33	33	40	48	52	42	40	32	26	37
Source: Republic Hydrometeorological Service of Serbia

=== Earthquakes ===
Kopaonik was hit five times by earthquakes of Mercalli intensity VII to VIII between 1978 and 1985. The 1983 earthquake had an intensity of VIII (Severe) and affected 7 villages, leaving 200 people homeless, and damaging 1,200 buildings and dwellings.

== Name ==
Due to its rich mines, Kopaonik was originally named Silver Mountain (Serbian: Сребрна планина, romanized: Srebrna planina) and that name was also used by the Romans, Venetians and Ottomans. Its current name, originally Kopalnik, is also connected to the ore mining as it comes from kopati, Serbian for digging.

== History ==
Kopaonik has a rich historical heritage. Oldest findings are from the Paleolithic and already show that local people used metals. Localities include Bela Stena, Veliki Krš and Jasova Bačija. Neolithic remains were discovered on the localities of Gornji Kaznovići (Rosulja and Lug), Greblje, Tomovićko Brdo and the Neolithic range of Beglučka.

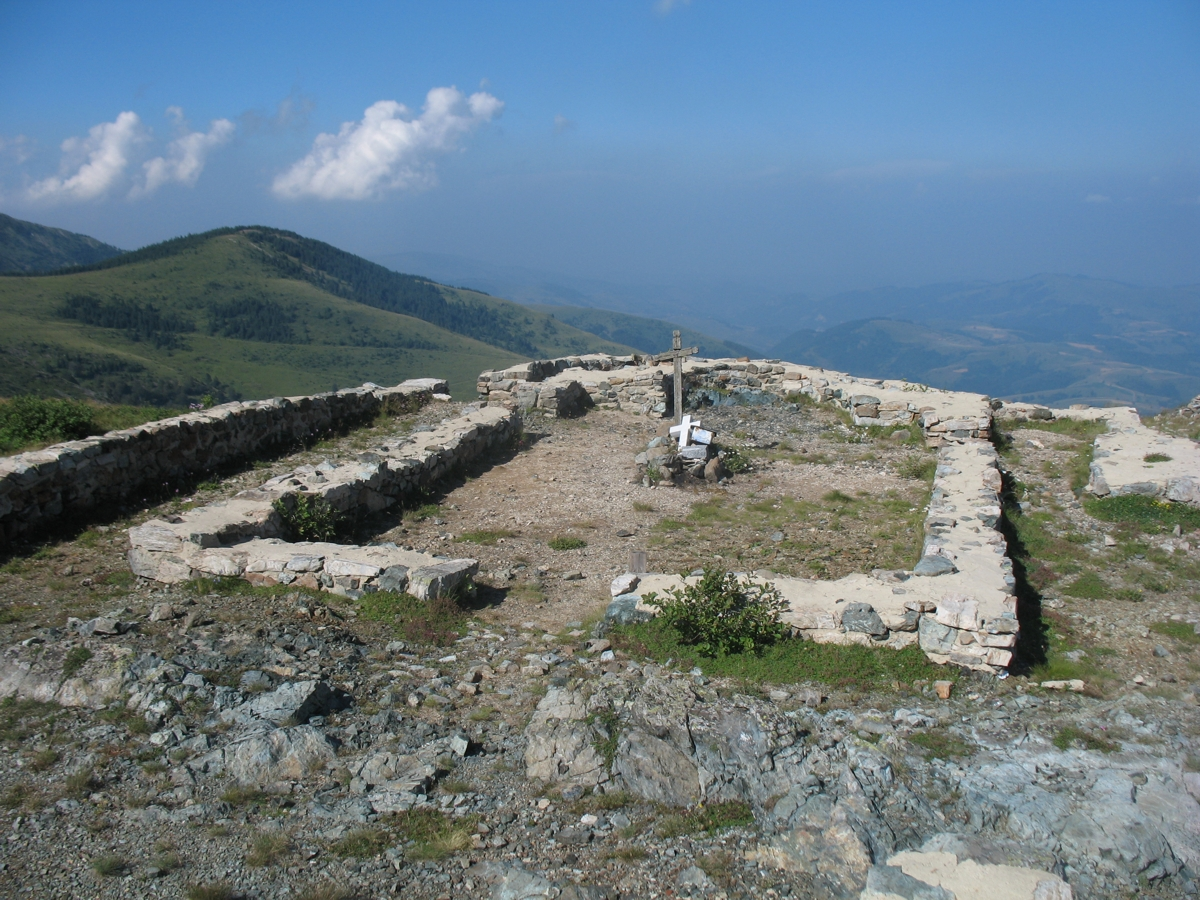
A basilica from the 3rd-4th centuries, a part of Nebeske stolice archaeological site

The mining fully developed during the Classical antiquity. The Romans began to dig the first proper mines and to build the surrounding settlements. The remains from this period include the archaeo-metallurgic complex Zajačak and the locality of Dobrinac in Rvati. Dobrinac originates from the 3rd or 4th century AD and it was the administrative center of the mining and metallurgic operations on the western slope of the mountain.

The area remained an important mining center in the Middle Ages and by the 14th century it became the main mining area of Serbia. Emperor Dušan visited the Silver Mountain in August 1336. In 1412 despot Stefan Lazarević granted the Law on mines which mentions the mines of gold, silver, iron, copper, lead and zinc in the area. By that time, the mountain already hosted the colonies of Saxons, Kotorans and Ragusians. Besides old churches and monasteries like Đurđevi stupovi, Studenica monastery, Sopoćani and Gradac Monastery, there are also several early and medieval fortresses locally, built by Serbian dynasties. The nearest Serbian medieval castle is Maglič.

During the Ottoman period, from the 15th century, the mining gradually ceased, but they developed the thermal springs, building hamams ("Turkish baths"). Remains of one are found in modern spa of Jošanička Banja.

First scientific exploration of the mountain's flora came in 1836-38 when the geologist Ami Boué visited the mountain. He made a collection of Kopaonik's plant life which is today kept in the Imperial Natural History Museum in Vienna. Botanist Josif Pančić gave the greatest scientific contribution to the plant life on Kopaonik. In 1851 he explored the mountain for the first time, followed by another 18 expeditions.

During World War II the Yugoslav Partisans and Chetniks were both active in the region. Chetnik vojvoda Dragutin Keserović, commander of the Rasina Corps and possibly the most active Chetnik leader, conducted various activities in and around Kopaonik, leading to the Waffen-SS launching Operation Kopaonik in order to eliminate Keserović and his unit, which ultimately failed in its purpose and instead led to the murders of 690 civilians, including the rounding-up and massacre of dozens of civilians in a church in Kriva Reka.

With territorial reorganization in the mid-1950s, the southern parts of Kopaonik were to be ceded from NR Serbia to its autonomous province Kosovo and Metohija. In 1959, Leposavić was incorporated into the province.

In Pančić's honor, marking the 100th anniversary of his first expedition, the highest point was renamed from Milan's Peak (Milanov vrh) to Pančić's Peak in 1951. A mausoleum was built on the peak and the remains of Pančić and his wife were reinterred in it. They were buried in the coffins made of Serbian spruce, which Pančić discovered.

== National park ==
Kopaonik national park
- Interactive map of Kopaonik national park
- Area: 121.06 km^{2} (46.74 sq mi)

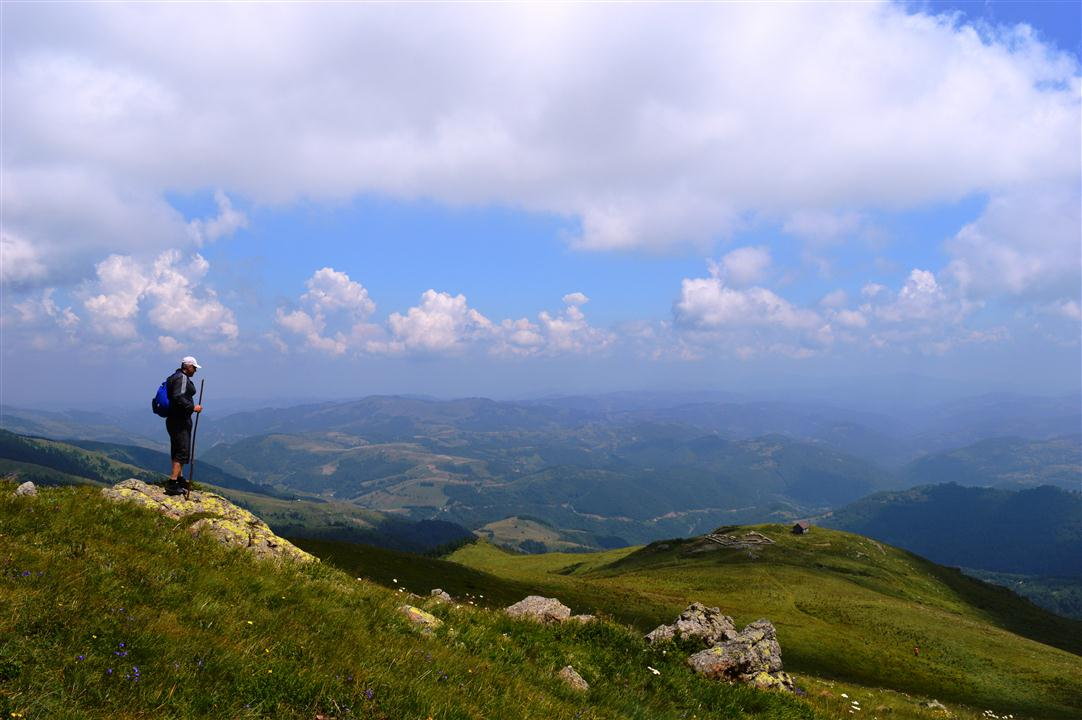
Landscape of a part of Kopaonik

In 1981, due to its location, climate, rich forests, variety of herbs, and area for holiday and recreation, 121.06 km^{2} (46.74 sq mi) of the range were proclaimed a national park.

The national park is situated on a relatively flat region, at an altitude of about 1,700 m (5,577 ft). This central Kopaonik plateau is called Suvo Rudište. It is surrounded by mountain peaks. To the north and northwest of this plateau stretches Banjski Kopaonik, which is the location of Jošanička Banja spa, whose strong springs' waters reach the temperature of 88 °C (190 °F). Directly below the Suvo Rudište plateau starts the valley of the Samokovska River, with its steep run, numerous rapids, falls and gorges. Kopaonik has over 200 sunny days annually and over 160 days covered by snow. There is also the Jelovarnik falls, the third highest waterfall in Serbia.

Kopaonik has several natural lookouts: Suvo Rudište, Gobelja, Karaman, Kukavica, Vučak and Treska. On a clear day, distant mountains in Montenegro, Bulgaria and Albania can be observed.

There are 13 localities within the park which are declared strict nature reserves: Barska Reka, Bele Stene, Vučak, Gobelja, Duboka, Jankove Bare, Jelak, Jelovarnik, Kozje Stene, Mrkonje, Metođe, Samokovska Reka and Suvo Rudište. The Jankove Bare reserve is located in the section called Ravni Kopaonik (Flat or Plateaued Kopaonik), at the altitude of 1,420 metres (4,660 ft), in the valley of the Rečica creek. Under the 1st level of protection, it is the reserve of the mire ecosystem, especially of rare and endangered and endemic plants, amphibians and birds (peregrine falcon, common buzzard, common redstart).

Soil erosion is a threat as there is a lot of logging and deforestation in the park.

== Ecology ==
=== Flora ===
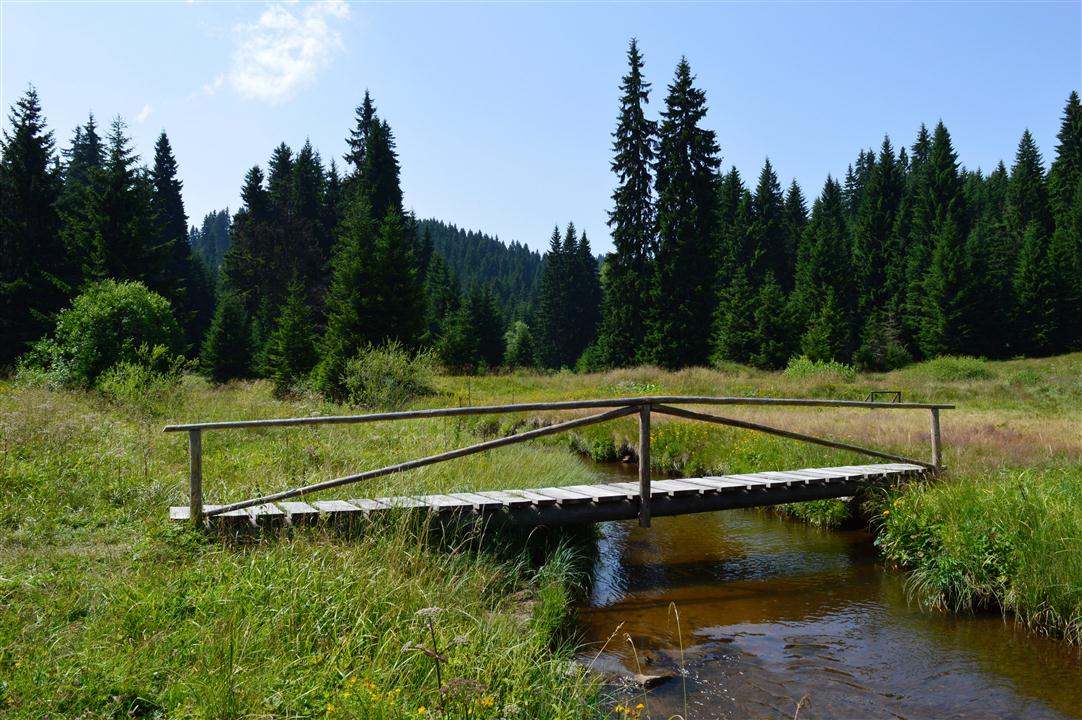
The mountain is rich with flora, including a number of autochthonous plant species.

Kopaonik's flora has a large number of autochthonous plant species (Balkan beech, fir, spruce, yew, several kinds of maple, pine and oak). Deciduous forests and native coniferous woodland make up most of the forested land in the park. There are also forests of willow, poplar, common hornbeam, durmast oak and Turkey oak. In total, there are 1,600 plant species in the park, out of which 200 grow only on Kopaonik. It also includes over 200 species of fungi. Special value of Kopaonik in terms of biological diversity is that 11.9% of the high mountain endemic species in the Balkans inhabits the mountain. Endemic species which grow only on Kopaonik include Kopaonik's houseleek, Kopaonik's violet and Pančić's bittercress. Other endemites include sea thrift, Balkan docks (Rumex balcanicus), Pancicia serbica, Blečić's columbine (Aquilegia blecicii), Bosnian marsh orchid, Bulgarian achillea (Achillea bulgarica), Alyssum, aconite and Yugoslav bell (Edrianthus jugoslavicus).

There are several "botanical monuments" in the park, with trees which are very old, large in size and still vital. Among them are the fir "of the hundred elbows" in Samokovska Reka, a spruce in Gobeljska Reka and three mountain sycamores in Kriva Reka.

With several other beech localities in the national parks of Fruška Gora and Tara, beech forest Kozje Stene on Kopaonik have been submitted for the inclusion into the UNESCO World Heritage Site Ancient and Primeval Beech Forests of the Carpathians and Other Regions of Europe in May 2020. The nomination was rejected due to the Serbian laws allowing shelterwood cutting on the area of 5 hectares (12 acres), while UNESCO accepts cut areas no larger than 1 hectare (2.5 acres), and even that is not only in the areas of the highest level of protection, but also in the surrounding zones.

=== Fauna ===
The fauna is also diverse but its concentration varies, depending on the quality of the habitat.

An endemic butterfly, the Balkan postman, lives on the mountain.

Kopaonik has 175 species of birds, including the protected ones like woodpecker and thrush. Other species include rock partridge, scops owl, red-backed shrike and wood lark.

Major representatives of the mammalian fauna are wild boar and wild cat. After they went extinct on the mountain in 1856, 30 red deers were reintroduced in the Kukavica locality in 2021. It is part of the wider project of reintroducing red deer in the central parts of Serbia.

In the part of the mountains within Kosovo, the golden jackal, the golden eagle, the grey wolf, the roe deer and the wildcat have been spotted.

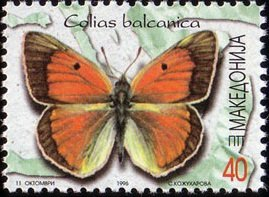
Colias caucasica is endemic to Kopaonik

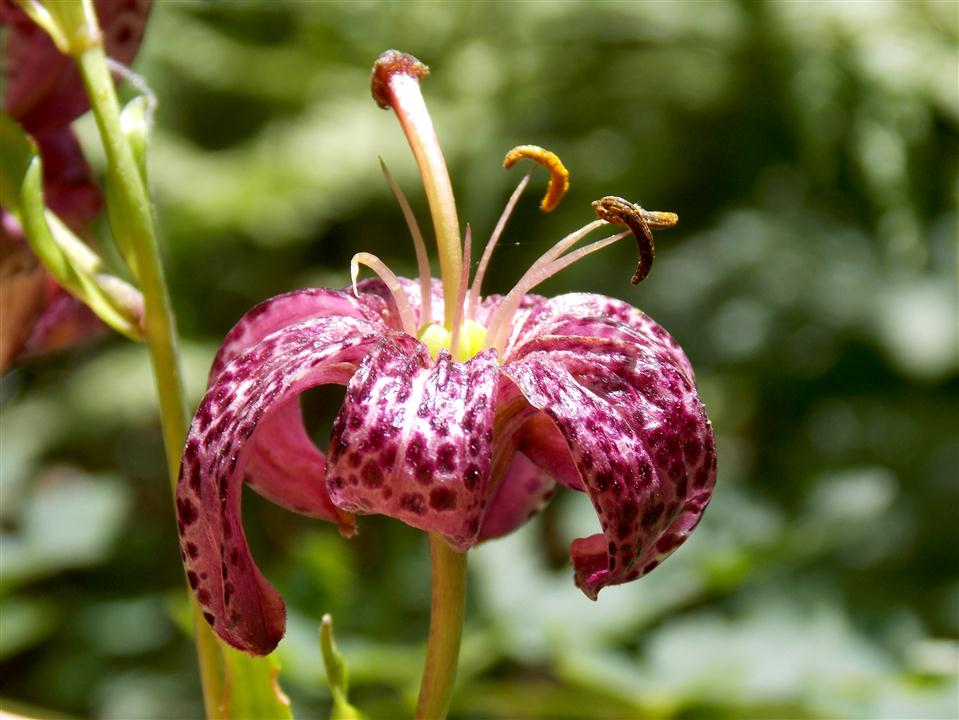
Lilium endemic to Kopaonik

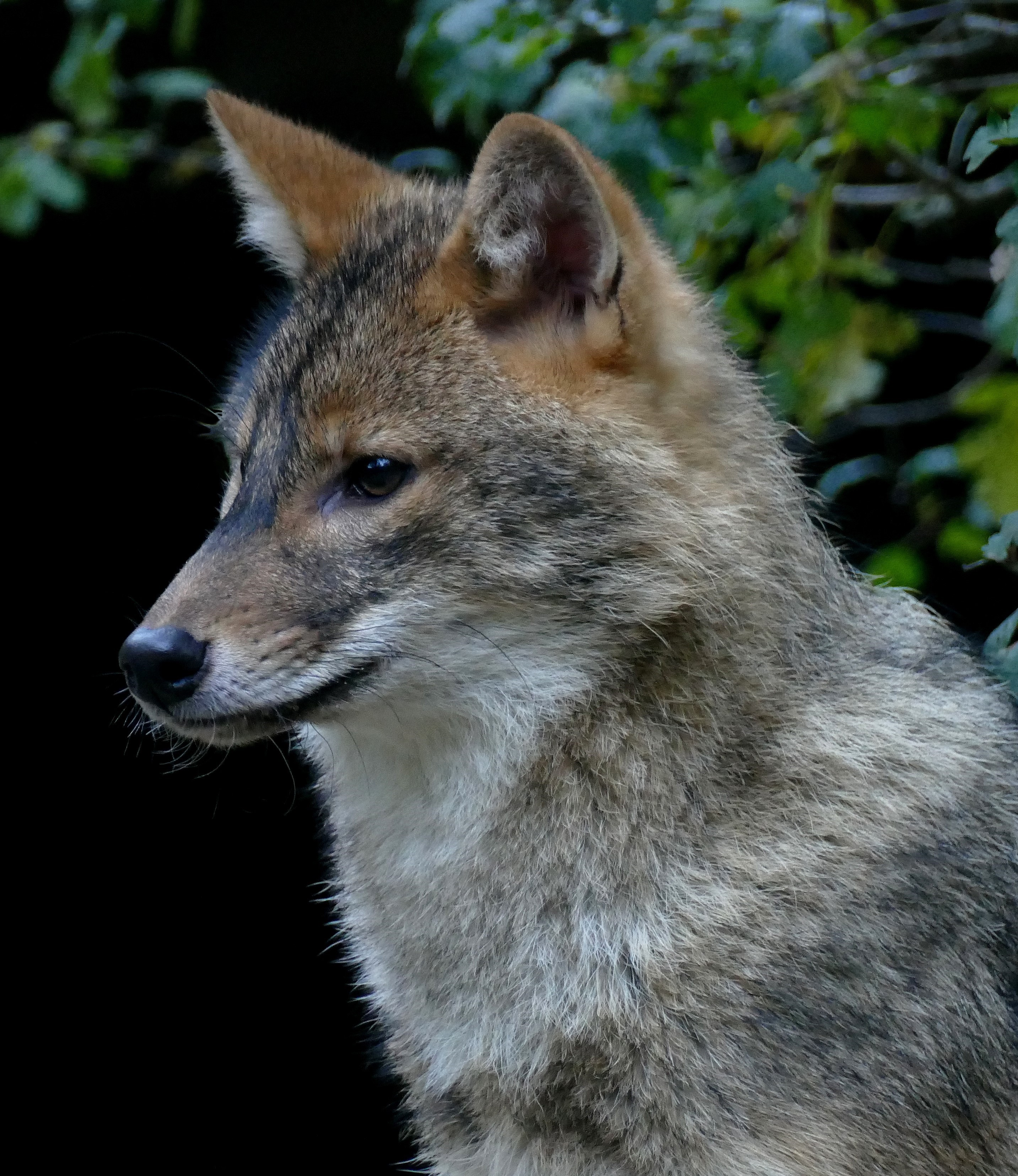
The European jackal

== Economy ==
In the Kosovar section of the Kopaonik mountains, specifically in the Shala e Bajgorës region, lies Kosovo's largest wind farm. The Bajgora Wind Farm is located in the southern foothills of the Kopaonik mountains, and it is in an altitude of 1,800 m (5,900 ft). With its 105.6 MW capacity, Bajgora Wind Farm accounts for around 10% of Kosovo's total installed domestic capacity.

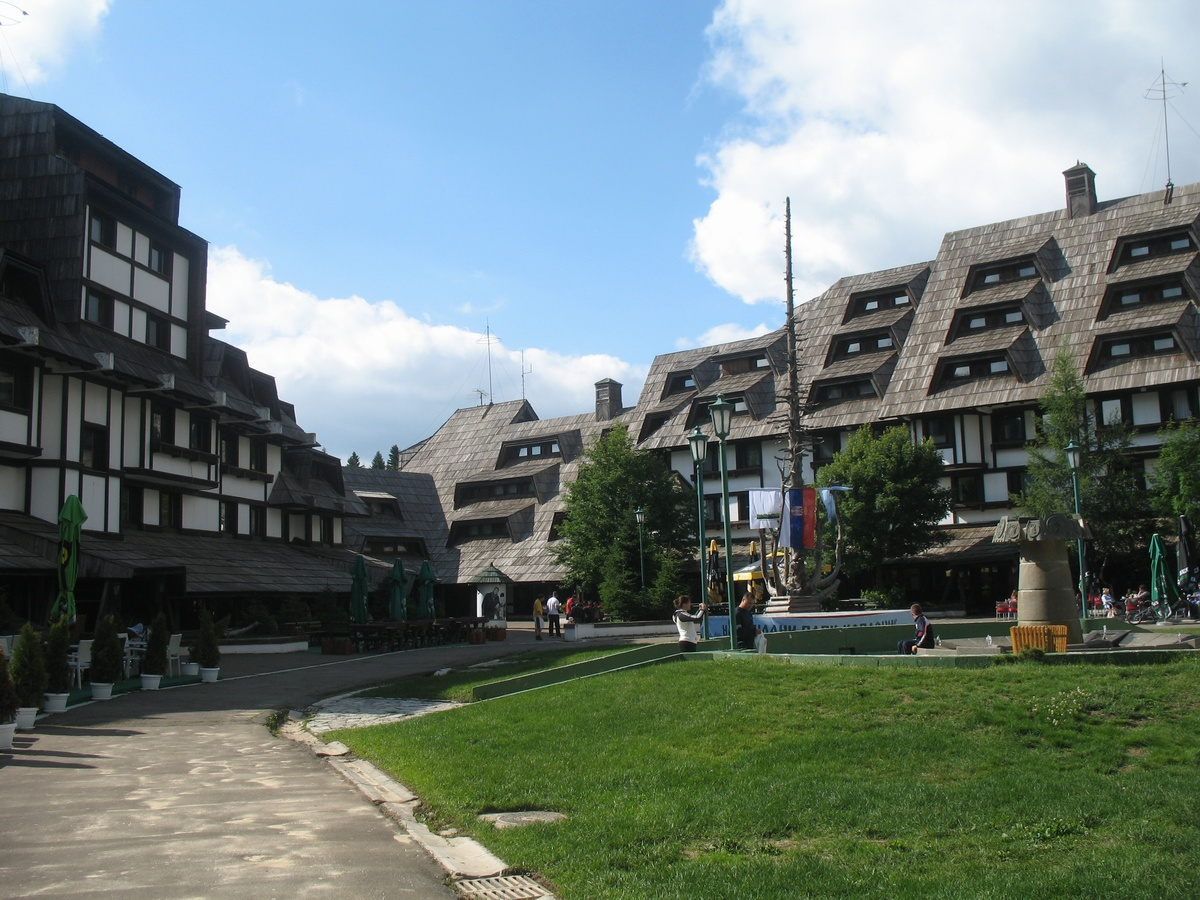
Hotels in Kopaonik

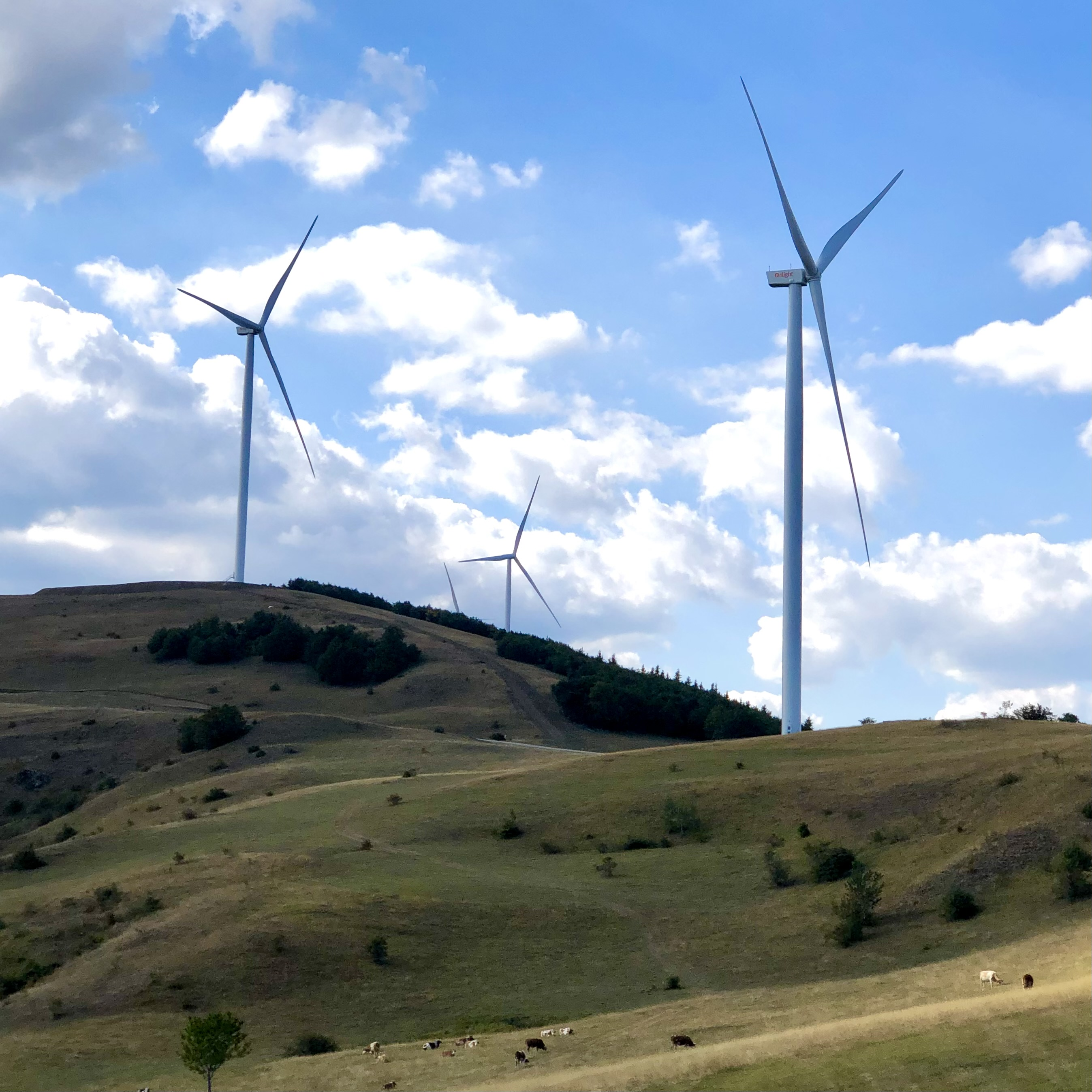
Bajgora Wind Farm

== Transportation ==
Kopaonik is well-connected with the main transport routes in Serbia. The central part of Kopaonik with the tourist center and ski slopes are linked with the Ibar highway, and the nearest international airport is in Niš. A public heliport is located in a military base half a mile north of the resort. in 2019, the longest artificial ski slope in Europe opened in the resort.

== See also ==
- 1983 Kopaonik earthquake
