= Rvati =

Rvati may refer to:

- Rvati (Raška), a village in Serbia
- Rvati (Obrenovac), a village in Serbia
- Arvati, a village in North Macedonia
