= Nemanja Popović (politician) =

Serbian politician

Nemanja Popović (Serbian Cyrillic: Немања Поповић; born 1990) is a politician in Serbia. He served in the National Assembly of Serbia from 2020 to 2022 and was chosen as the mayor of Raška in October 2022. Popović is a member of the Serbian Progressive Party (Srpska napredna stranka, SNS).

== Private career ==
Popović has a bachelor's degree in history. He has participated in the SNS's Academy of Young Leaders program.

== Politician ==
=== Member of the Raška assembly ===
Popović received the sixteenth position on the Progressive Party's electoral list for the Raška municipal assembly in the 2016 Serbian local elections and was elected when the list won a majority victory with nineteen out of thirty-five mandates. He was promoted to the third position on the party's list for the 2020 local elections, and was re-elected when the list won twenty-seven mandates.

=== Parliamentarian ===
Popović received the 191st position on the Progressive Party's Aleksandar Vučić — For Our Children list in the 2020 Serbian parliamentary election and narrowly missed direct election when the list won a landslide majority with 188 of 250 mandates. He received a mandate on 28 October 2020 as the replacement for another party member. During his term in the assembly, Popović was a member of the European Union–Serbia stabilization and association committee and the parliamentary friendship groups with Cuba, Hungary, Israel, the Philippines, Russia, Spain, Turkey, and the United Arab Emirates.

Popović did not appear on the SNS's list for the 2022 parliamentary election, and his term ended when the new assembly convened on 1 August 2022.

=== Mayor of Raška ===
In October 2022, most elected delegates of the Progressive Party withdrew their support from mayor Ignjat Rakitić, due to what was described as "urban planning chaos" in Kopaonik. Rakitić was dismissed as mayor, and Popović was chosen as his replacement.
