= Pančić's Peak =

Highest point of the Kopaonik mountain

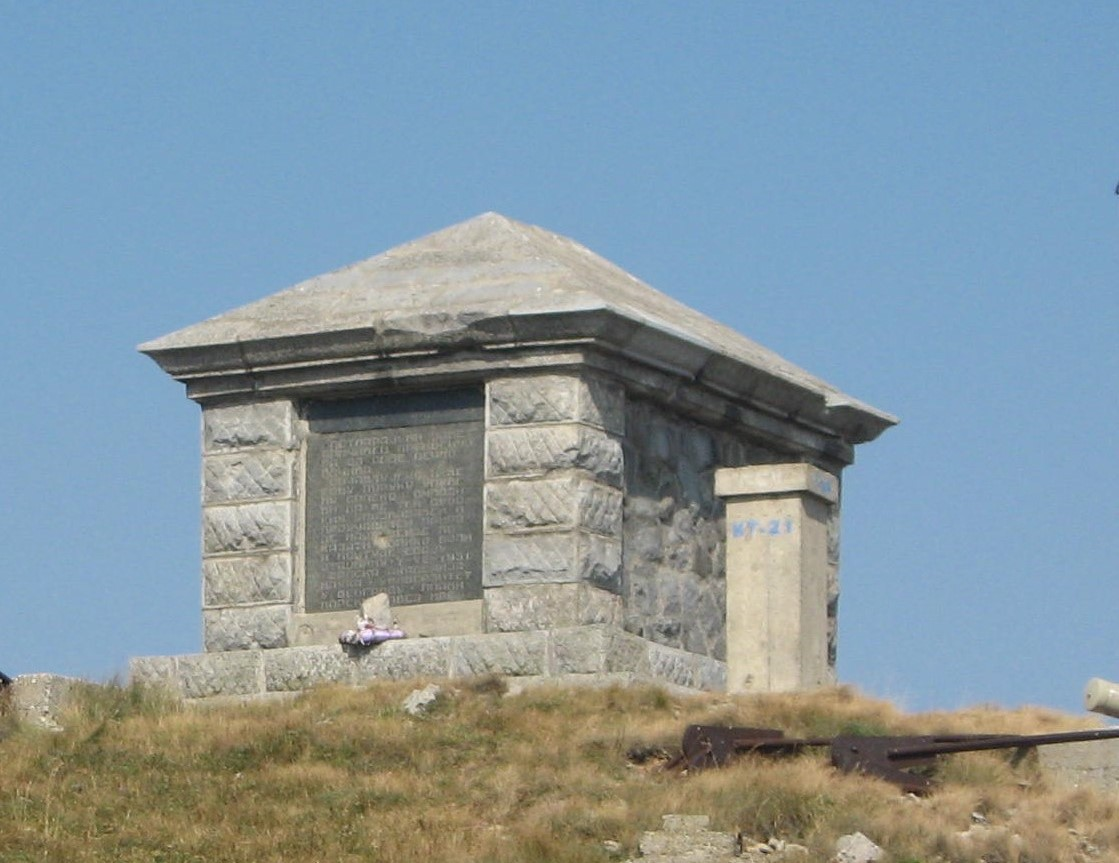
- Mausoleum of Josif Pančić on Pančić's Peak

Highest point
- Elevation: 2,017 m (6,617 ft)
- Prominence: 1,444 m (4,738 ft)
- Listing: Ribu
- Coordinates: 43°16′05″N 20°49′33″E

Naming
- Native name: Панчићев врх (Serbian); Maja Pançiq (Albanian)

Geography
- Location within Kosovo Location within Serbia
- Countries: Kosovo; Serbia
- Parent range: Kopaonik

Climbing
- Normal route: From Brzeće

Pančić's Peak (Serbian: Панчићев врх, romanized: Pančićev vrh; Albanian: Maja Pançiq) is the highest point in the Kopaonik mountain range, which straddles southern Serbia and northern Kosovo. The peak is 2,017 m (6,617 ft) high, located in the Brus municipality in Serbia and in the Leposavić municipality in Kosovo. The Serbia–Kosovo demarcation line lies some 50 m south of the summit. Pančić's Peak is part of the Suvo Rudište mountainous plateau and natural zone of the Kopaonik National Park. The Kopaonik tourist center operates cable cars to Pančić's Peak and Suvo Rudište Peak.

== History ==
The mountain peak was previously named Milan's Peak (Миланов врх, Milanov vrh) after the first king of modern Serbia, Milan I. On 7 July 1951, it was renamed after the Serbian botanist Josif Pančić, whose remains were buried at the top in a small mausoleum, located next to the radio tower. A memorial to Pančić was placed at the top already in 1897. The site was damaged during the 1999 NATO bombing of Yugoslavia. The Serbian portion of the Kopaonik (including Pančić's Peak) is part of the Kopaonik National Park, and the only road access to the peak is via the park. The peak can easily be reached on foot from the Konaci tourist complex.

== See also ==
- List of mountains in Kosovo
- List of mountains in Serbia

== Sources ==
- Maletić, Mihailo (1968). Josif Pančić: Kopaonik i njegovo podgorje. Izdavačko odeljenje Istorijskog arhiva.
- Milićević, Jovan (1965). Srbija: Znamenitosti i lepote. Književne novine. p. 29.
- Naše Planine. Vol. 31. 1979. p. 274.
