= Kopaonik ski resort =

Ski resort near Brus, Serbia

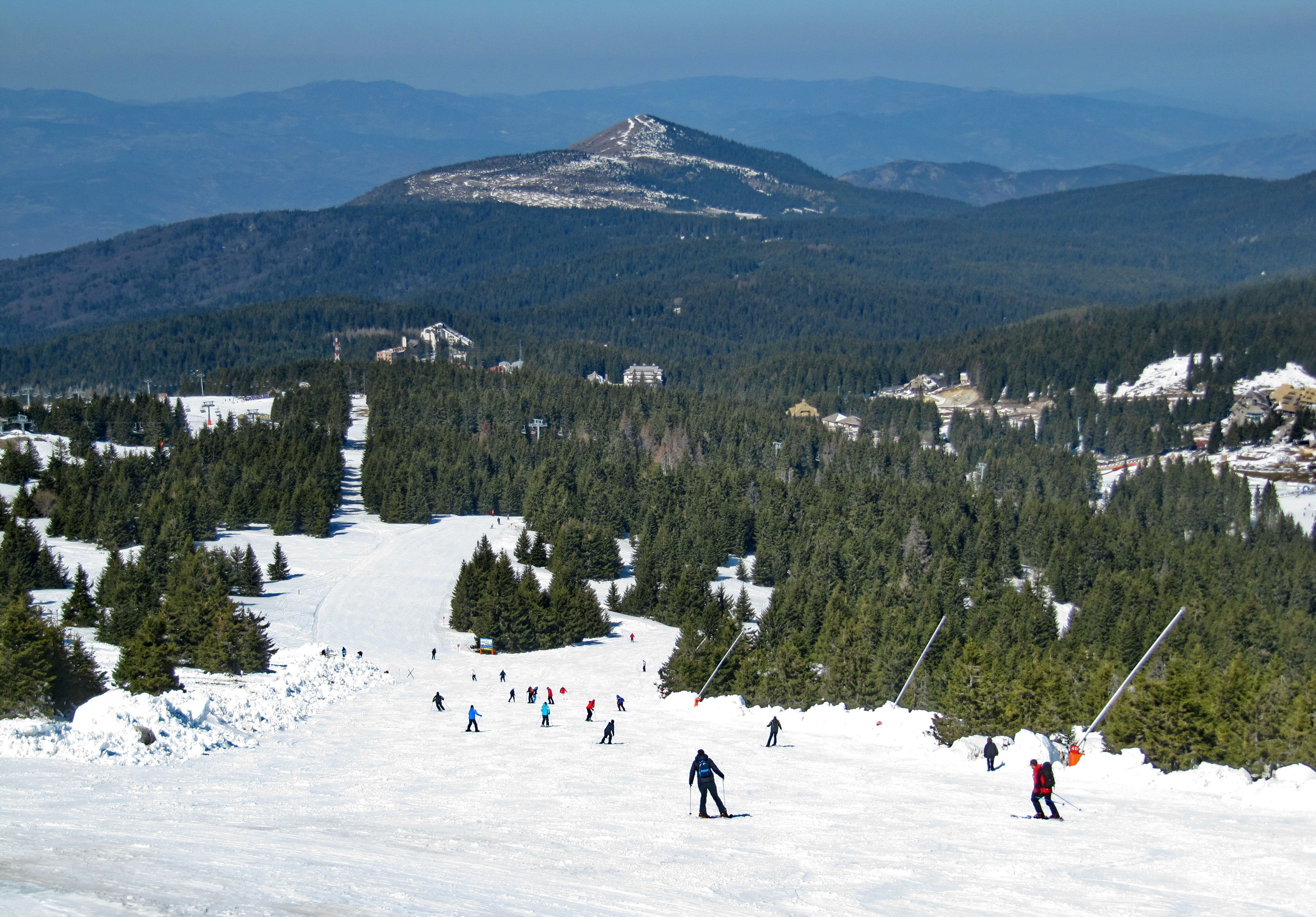
- Kopaonik ski resort trails

- Location within Serbia
- Location: Kopaonik Mountain
- Nearest city: Brus, Serbia
- Coordinates: 43°16′9″N 20°49′21″E
- Top elevation: 2,017 m (6,617 ft) (Pančić's Peak)
- Base elevation: 1,770 m (5,810 ft)
- Skiable area: 55 km (34 mi)
- Trails: 25
- Longest run: 3.5 km (2.2 mi)
- Lift system: 25 total (10-passenger gondola, 3 high-speed 6-passenger superchairs, 7 high-speed quad chairs, 11 surface and 3 kid-surface lifts)
- Lift capacity: 32,000/hour
- Snowfall: 160 days
- Snowmaking: Yes
- Night skiing: Yes
- Website: www.eng.infokop.net

Kopaonik ski resort or Kopaonik ski center (Serbian: Ски-центар Копаоник / Ski-centar Kopaonik) is a mountain resort and the largest center of winter tourism in Serbia. Located on the slopes of Kopaonik Mountain, it is mainly a destination for skiing and snowboarding, but also offers various other activities like tennis. In the area, there are several hotels and hostels, cafes, bars and night clubs.

== History ==
Kopaonik ski resort was established in 1964, when the first chairlift was opened. In 1981, Kopaonik Mountain was proclaimed a national park of Serbia. In the same year, the International Ski Federation (FIS) recognized ski resort as an international ski center.

In 1999, it was bombed several times as the Serbian Armed Forces military base is located nearby.

== Features ==
As of 2025, Kopaonik ski resort has 25 ski lifts, with 55 km (34 mi) of ski slopes for all categories. With around 55 km (34 mi) of alpine ski runs and 12 km (7 mi) of cross country runs, it is the largest ski resort in Serbia. Among other features, it has night skiing run and artificial snow system covering most of the resort.

Kopaonik has mild winters with high levels of snowfall, and on average about 200 sunny days annually with 160 days covered with snow.

Kopaonik ski resort has been described as one of the best ski resorts in South East Europe, with beginner and lower-intermediate terrain for skiers.

== Festivals ==
There is an annual music festival "Big Snow" held from 23 to 29 March in the area of ski resort. The festival gathers international reggae, jazz and electronic music performers.

The ski resort has a "Snow Park" for extreme skiers and snowboarders. The park has expanses of grassland, forests composed of a variety of tree species, beauty spots, and river gorges. The snow blanket lasts a long time on this mountain and there are favorable conditions for the expansion of winter tourism there.

== Transportation ==
Kopaonik ski resort is well-connected with the main transport routes in Serbia. It is linked with the Ibar highway, It is located 127 km (79 mi) (two-hour drive) from the international airport Niš Constantine the Great Airport and 287 km (178 mi) (four-hour drive) from the Belgrade Nikola Tesla Airport. The recently open Morava Airport near Kraljevo is much closer to this ski resort (102 km, 63 mi, approximately, hour-and-half-drive by Ibar highway). However, it is only in its early development phase, although it is expected that this aerodrome will serve as the main hub for Kopaonik in the future. Also, a public heliport is located in a military base 0.8 km (0.50 mi) north of the resort.

== Ski slopes and ski lifts ==
Ski slopes and ski lifts on Kopaonik
No.	Name	Type	Length (m)	Height difference (m)	Difficulty of the slope
1	Sunčana Dolina		963	191	easy
2	Malo jezero		450	76	easy
3	Krst		671	116	easy
4	Pančićev vrh		1.393	248	easy/medium
5	Treska		781	200	easy
6	Duboka 1		1.409	385	medium/hard
7	Karaman greben		1.225	173	easy
8	Mali Karaman		1042	193	easy
8a	Mali Karaman A		1082	193	easy
9	Marine vode		909	187	easy
9a	Marine vode A		909	187	easy
10	Karaman		857	140	easy
11	Jaram		598	68	easy
12	Gobelja relej		706	180	easy/medium
13	Gobelja		878	232	medium/hard
14	Kneževske bare		836	149	easy
15	Gondola Brzeće		3745	844	easy/hard
19	Gvozdac		1500	384	hard
20	Duboka 2		1107	395	medium
21	Krčmar		1939	471	medium
22	Mašinac		300	45	easy
24	Vučak 2		222	20	easy

== Gallery ==
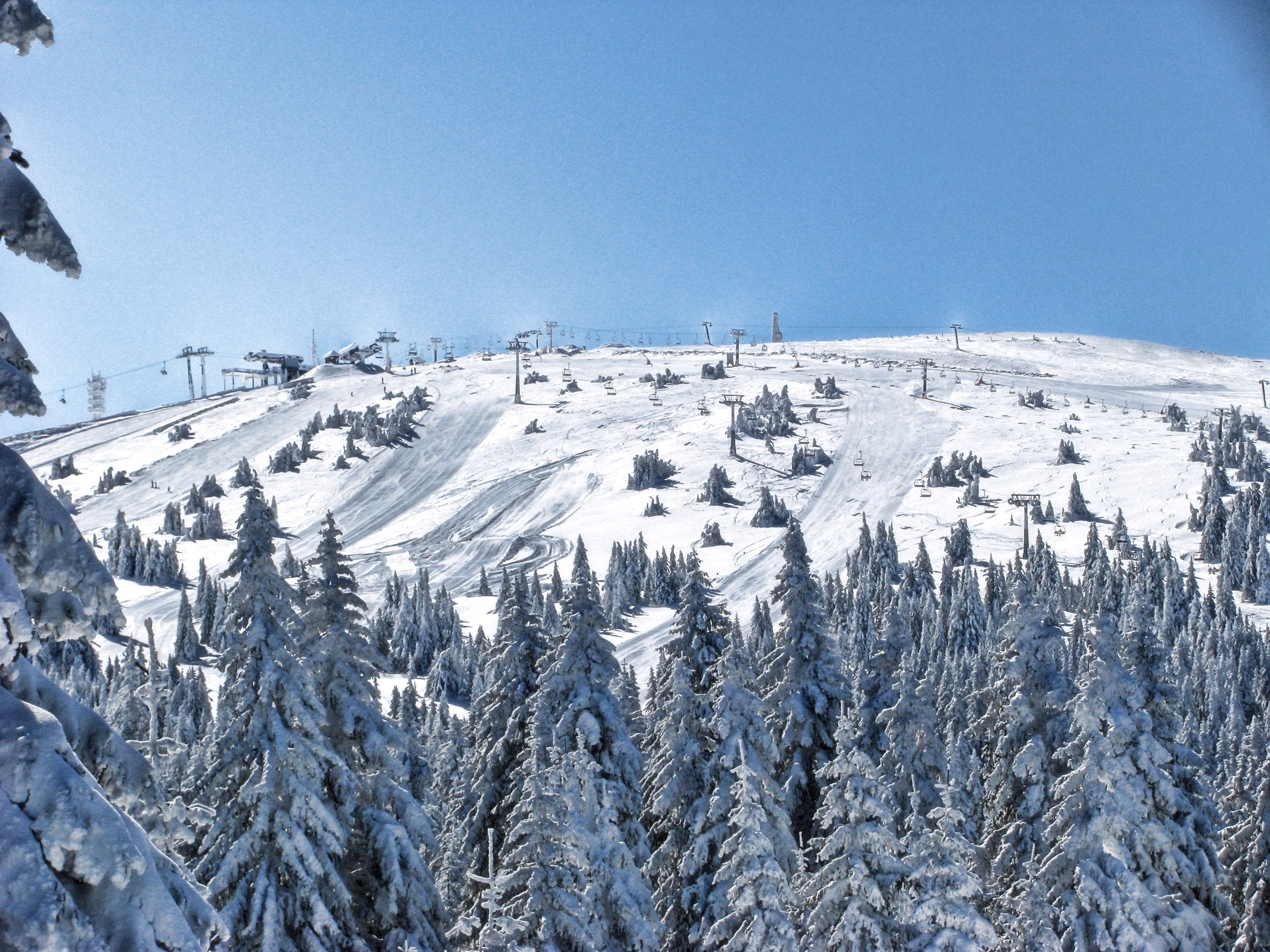
View on Pančić's Peak during winter

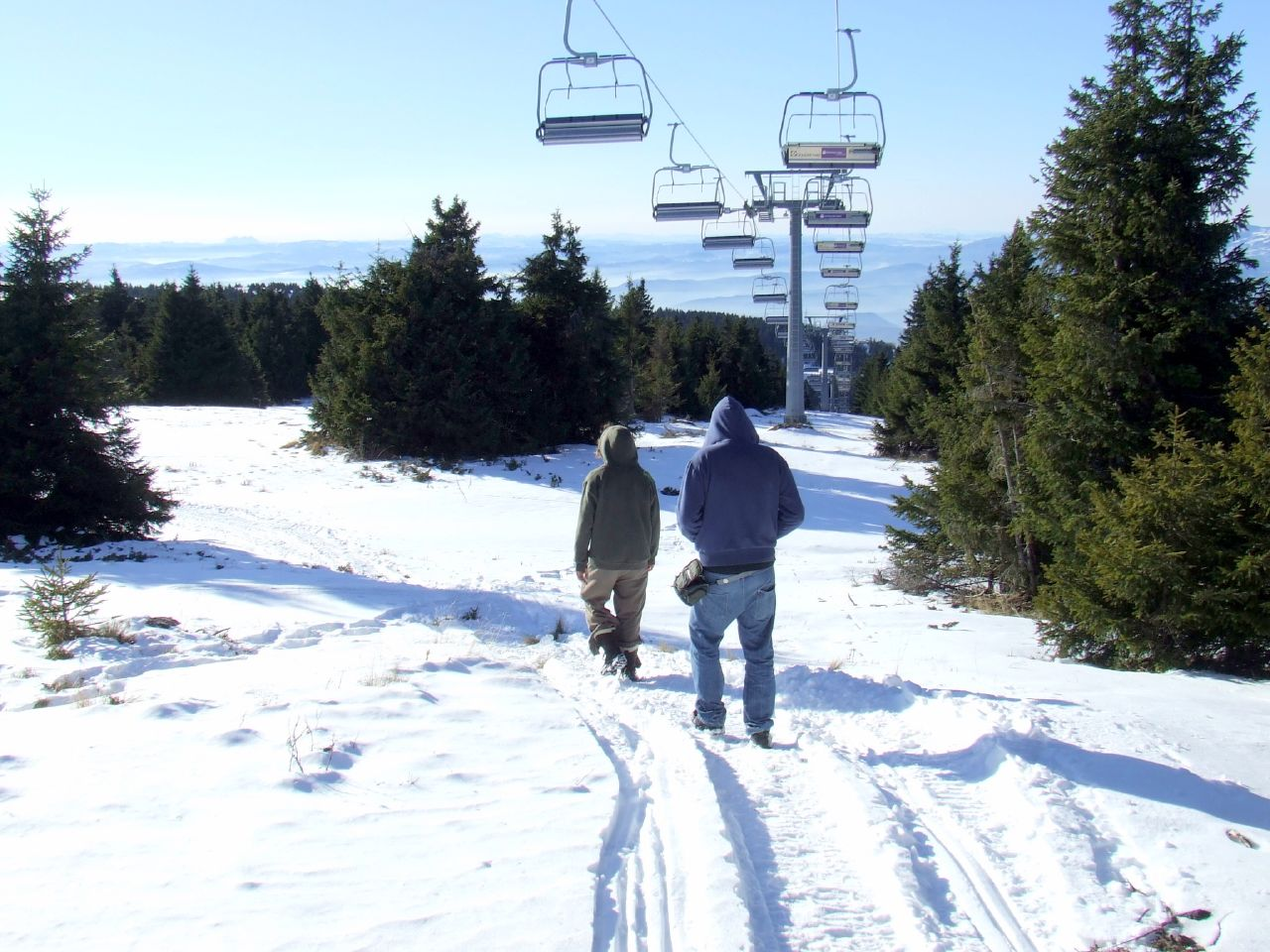
Kopaonik landscape with chairlifts

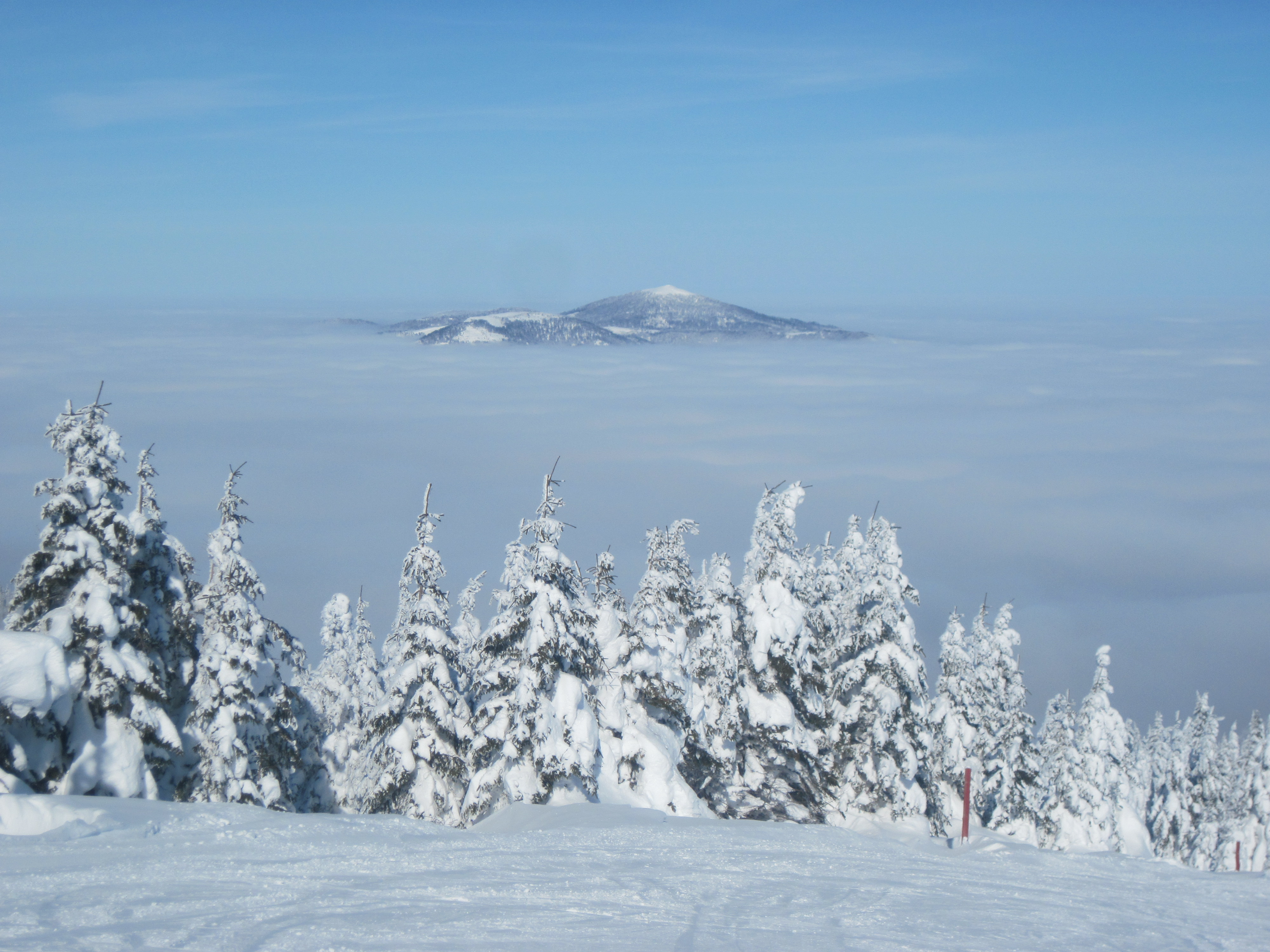
Kopaonik panorama

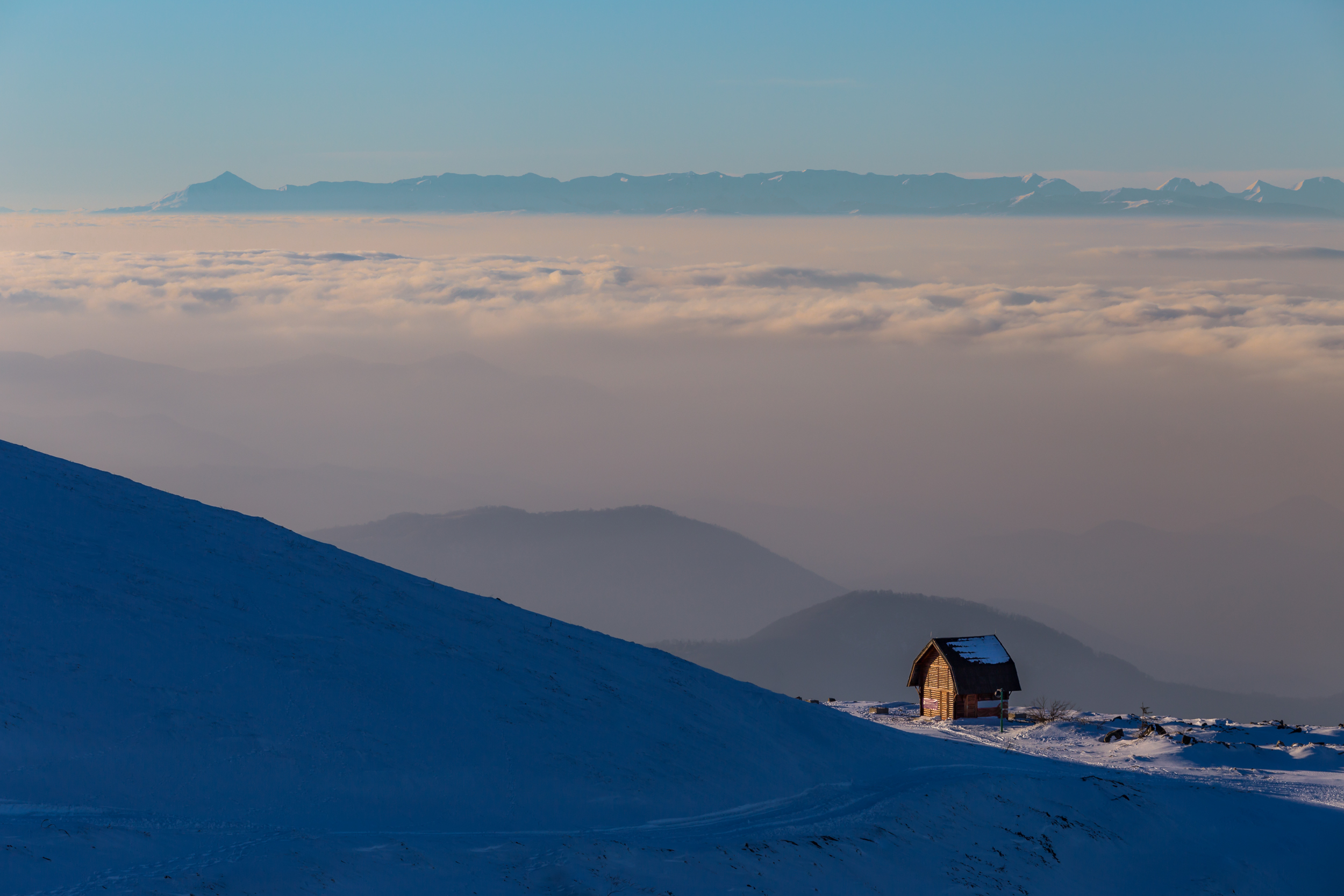
Kopaonik panorama

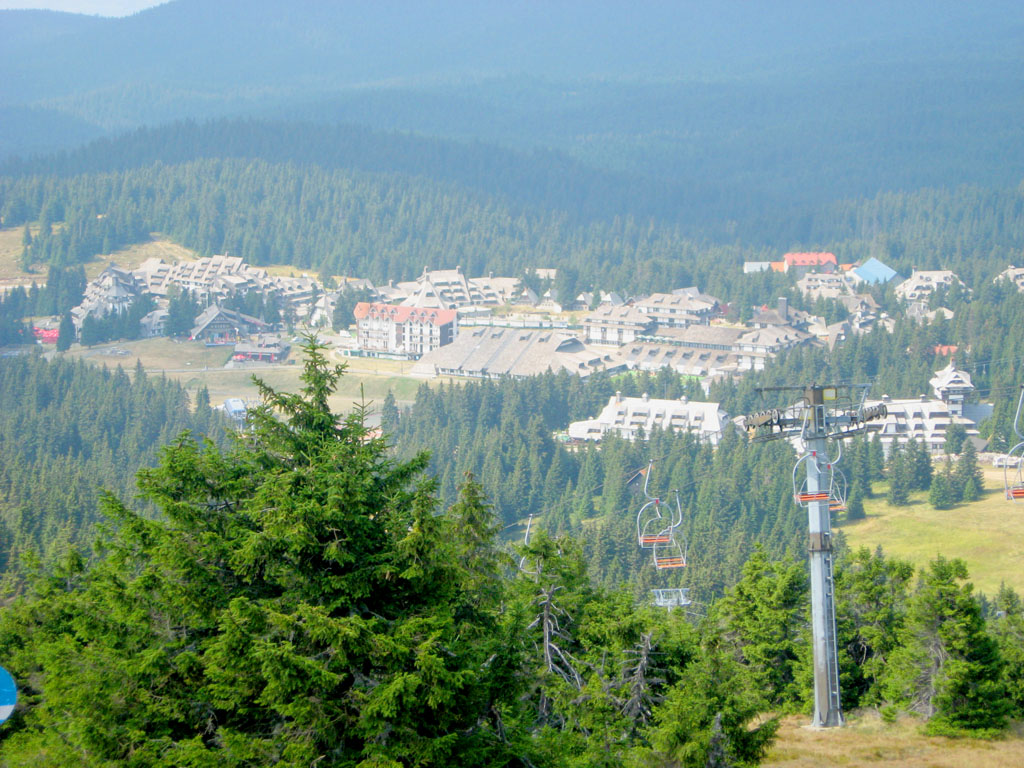
Hotels in Kopaonik

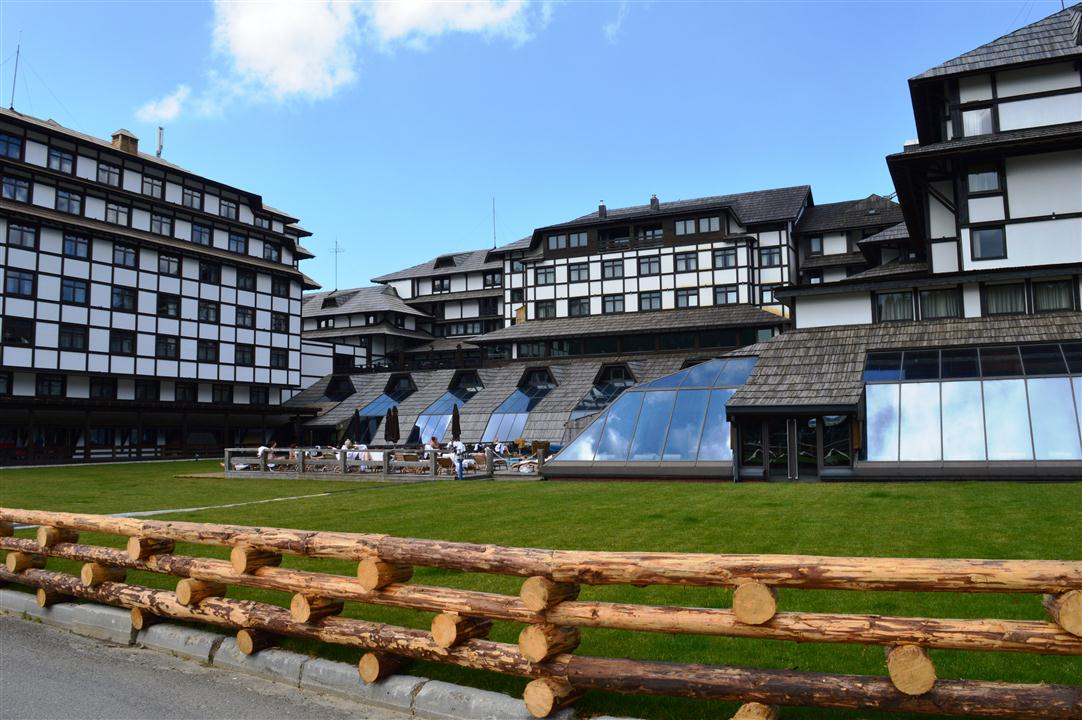
Hotel Grand Kopaonik

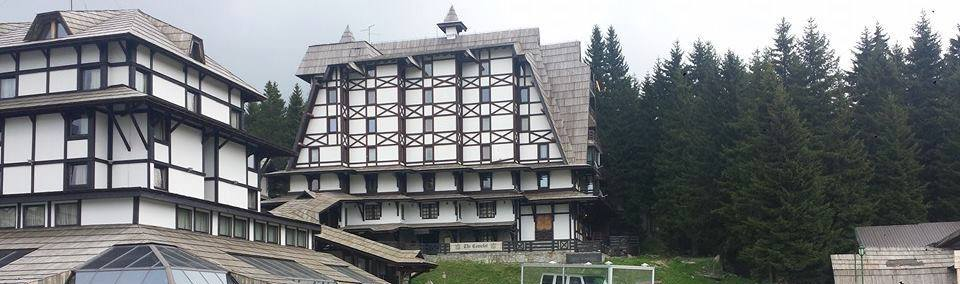
Hotels on Kopaonik

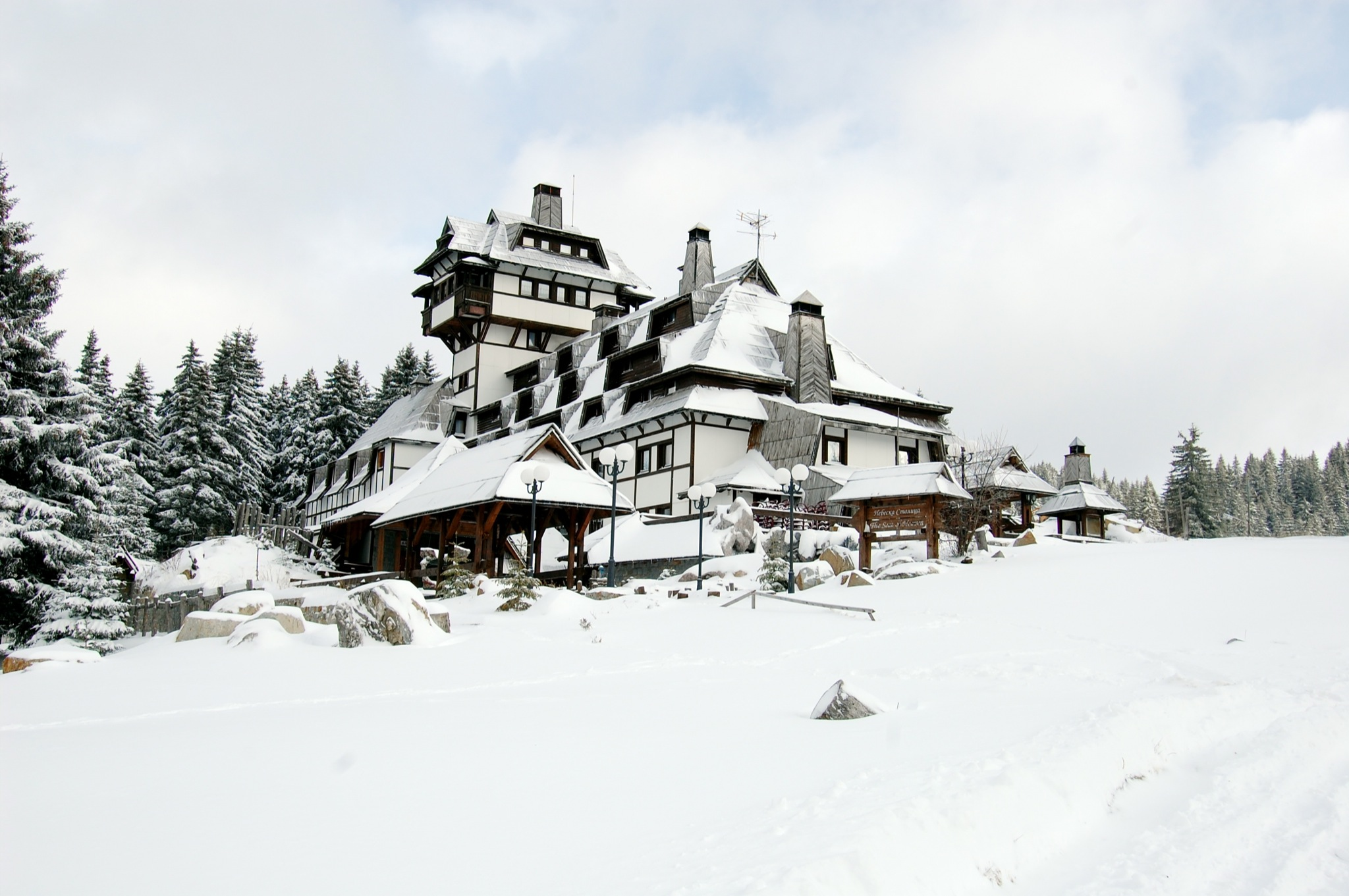
Hotel Nebeske Stolice

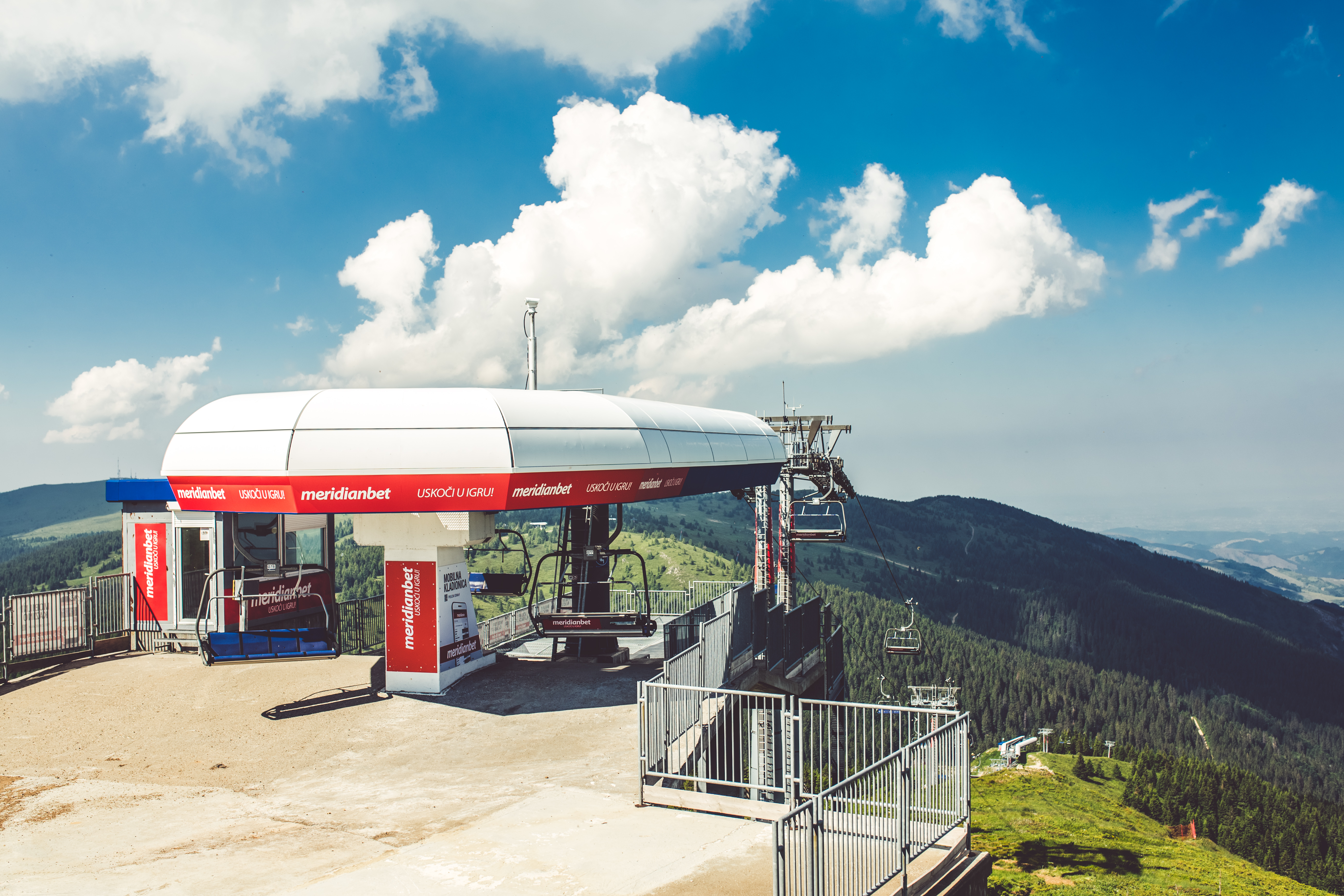
Ski lift station Kopaonik

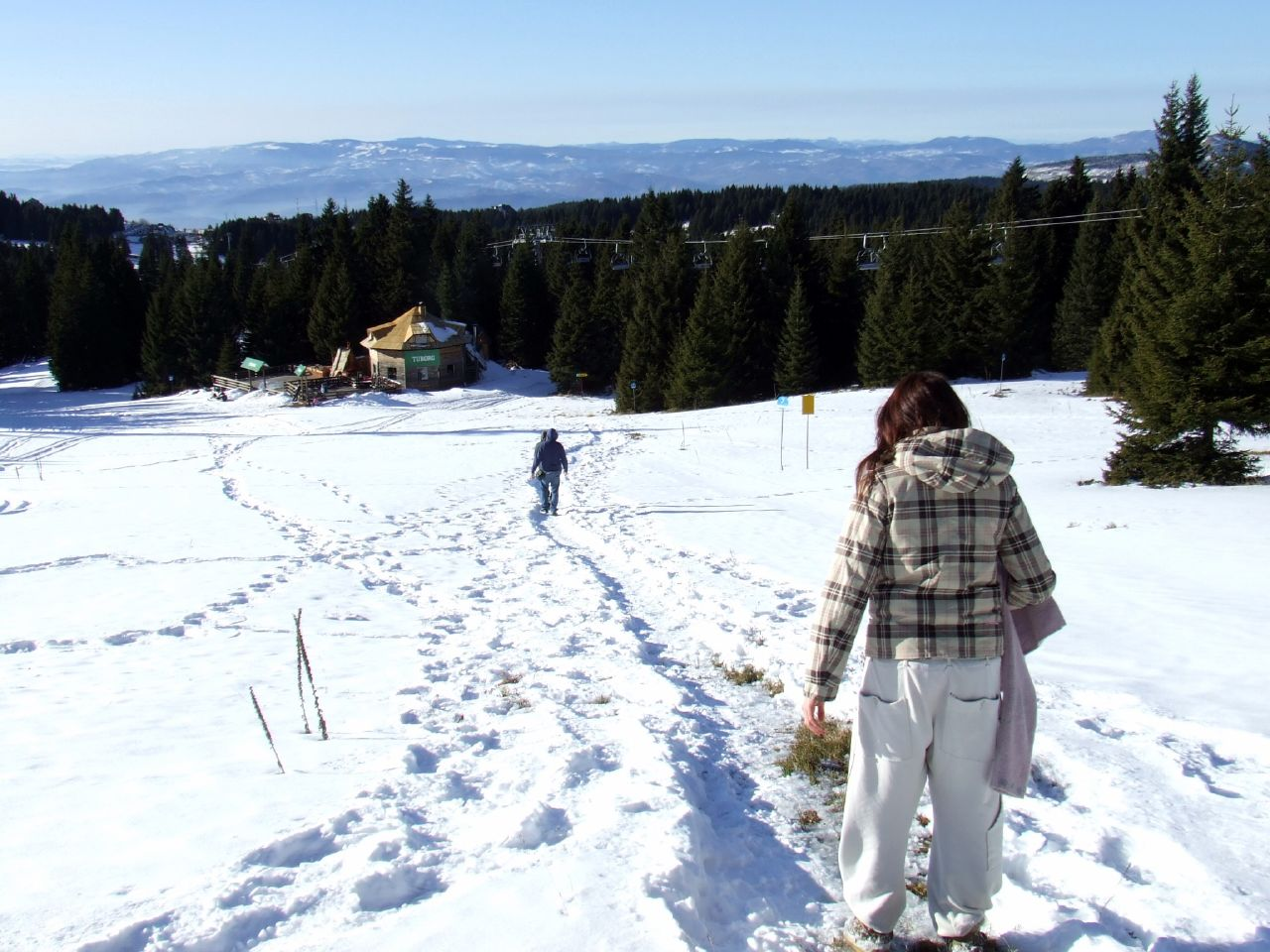
Kopaonik ski resort walk paths

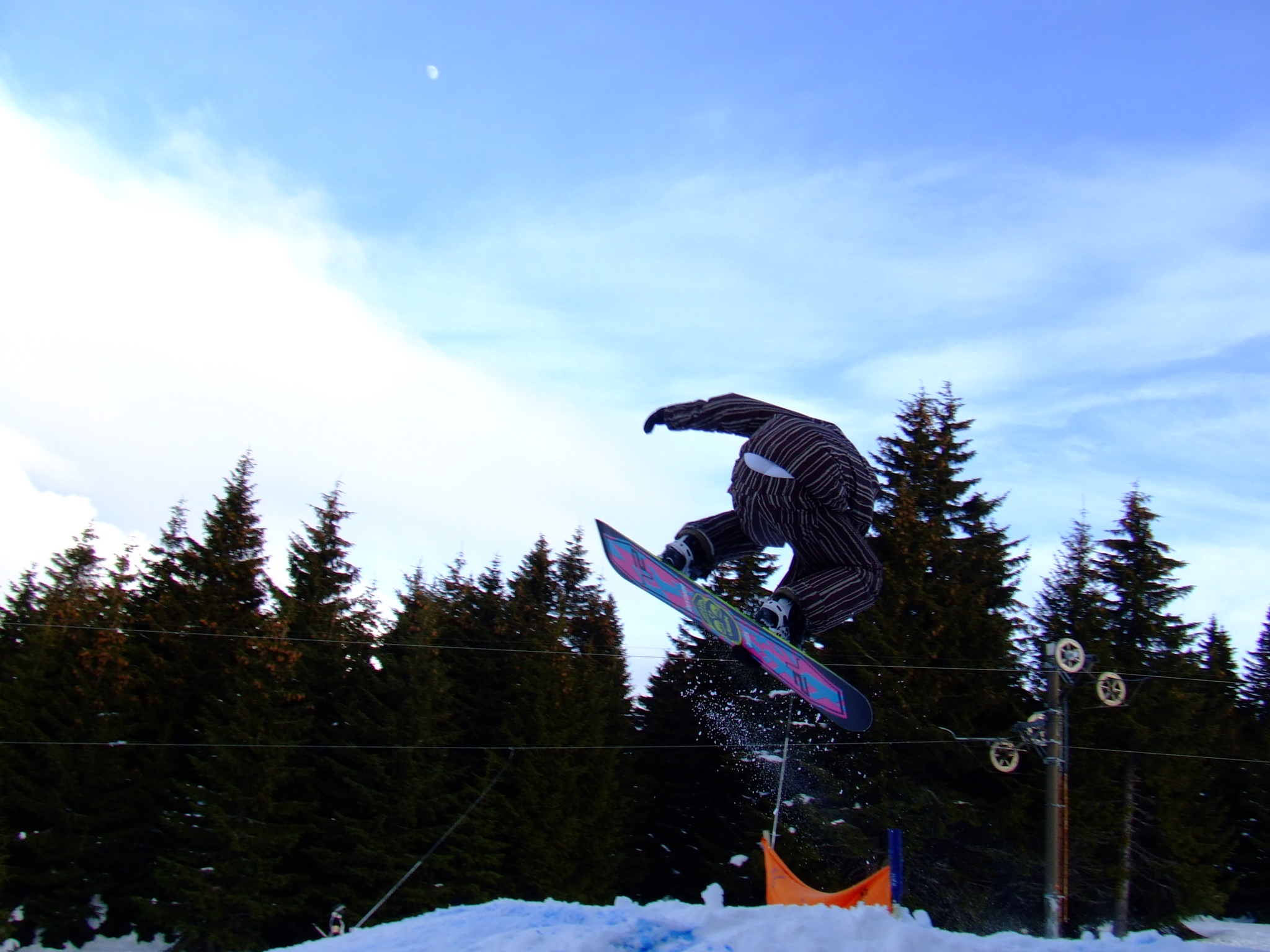
Snowboarding in Kopaonik

== See also ==
- Tourism in Serbia
