= Suvo Rudište =

Mountain in Serbia

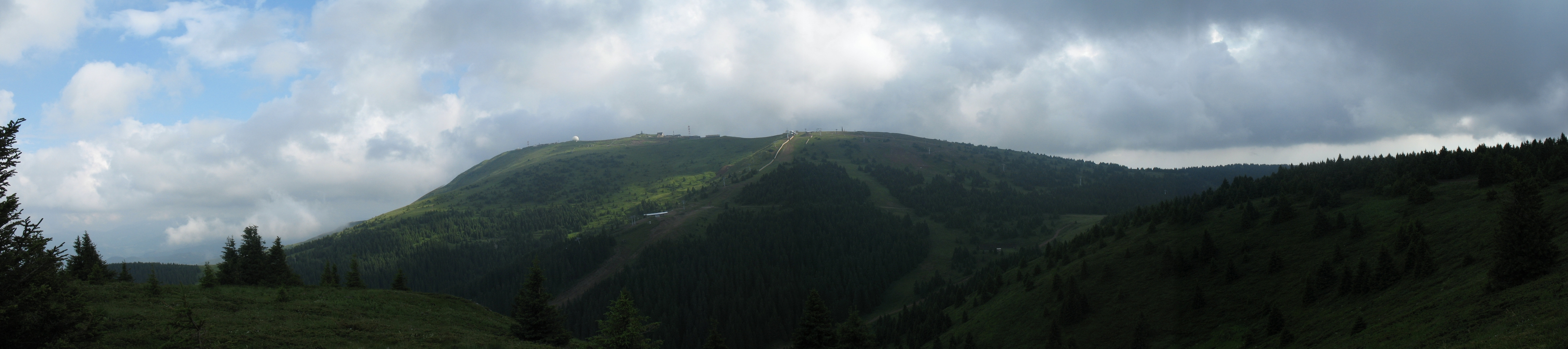
- Pančić's Peak (left) and Suvo Rudište Peak (right), highest peaks on Kopaonik.

Highest point
- Elevation: 1,976 m (6,483 ft)
- Coordinates: 43°16′18″N 20°49′04″E

Geography
- Location within Serbia
- Location: Serbia
- Parent range: Kopaonik

Suvo Rudište (Serbian Cyrillic: Суво Рудиште) is the name of a mountain plateau and its peak at 1976 m, belonging to the Kopaonik mountain (and Kopaonik mountain range) in Serbia.

The locale of Suvo Rudište (a tourist settlement), in Kopaonik, is a center of the Kopaonik National Park. The area is a natural reservation, covering 50,63 hectares, located on the northeastern slopes of the Suvo Rudište Peak, on part of the slopes stretching from Pančić's Peak towards the source prong of Brzećka reka including the locale of Krčmar voda.

The area was studied by botanist Josif Pančić (1814–1888).

It was a site of operations in World War II.

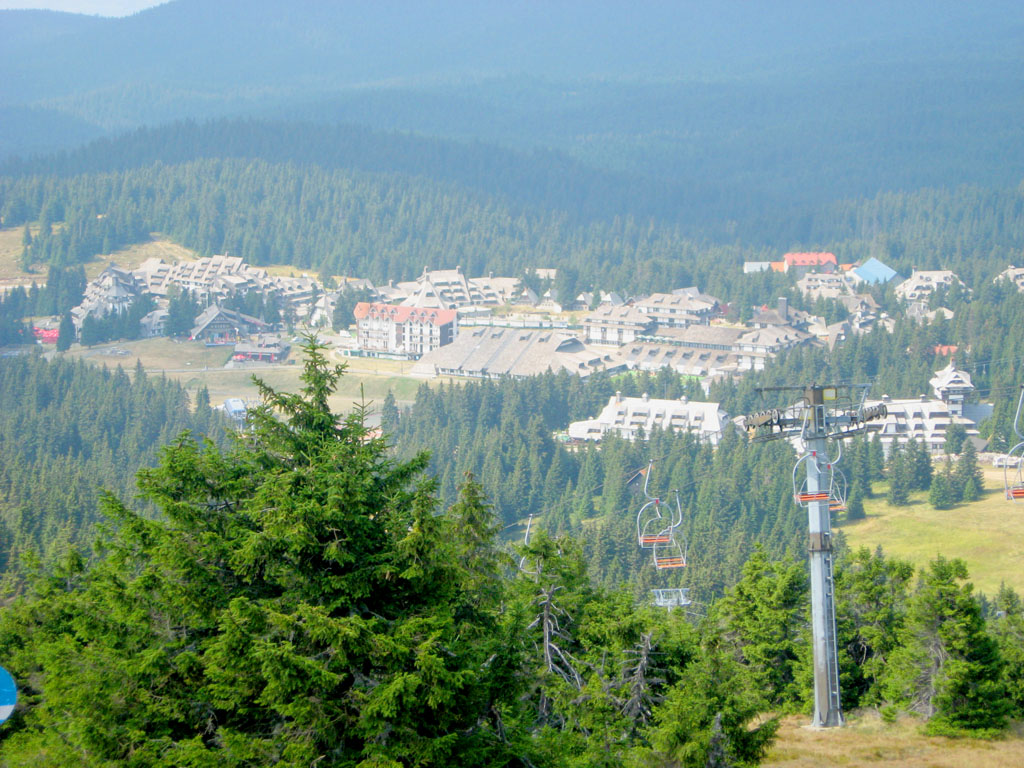
Hotels in the Kopaonik tourist centre, view from the slopes of Suvo Rudište.
