= Brzeće =

Brzeće Брзеће
- Village
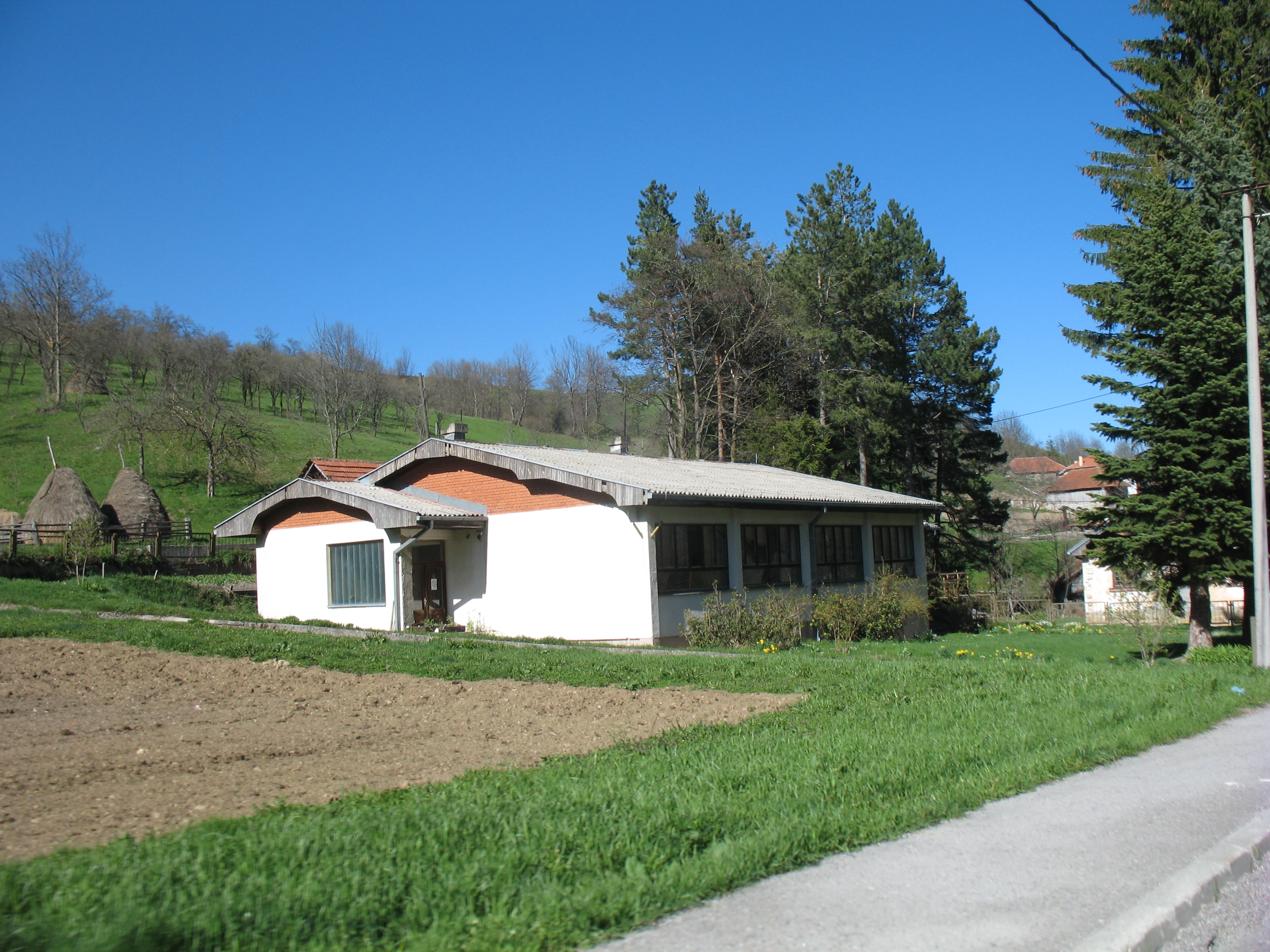
- Primary School in Brzeće

- Location within Serbia
- Coordinates: 43°18′N 20°53′E
- Country: Serbia
- District: Rasina District
- Municipality: Brus

Area
  - Total: 26.07 km^{2} (10.07 sq mi)
- Elevation: 1,193 m (3,914 ft)

Population (2011)
  - Total: 238
  - Density: 9.13/km^{2} (23.6/sq mi)
- Time zone: UTC+1 (CET)
  - Summer (DST): UTC+2 (CEST)

Brzeće (Serbian Cyrillic: Брзеће) is a village located in the municipality of Brus, Serbia. As of 2011 census, it has a population of 238 inhabitants.

The Kopaonik ski resort is located in close proximity of the village. The village is popular due to its rural hand-made art that can be seen by anyone passing by car on the road (360 panorama).

== Demographics ==
According to the 2011 census, the village has a population of 238 inhabitants, down from 258 inhabitants as of 2002 census.
