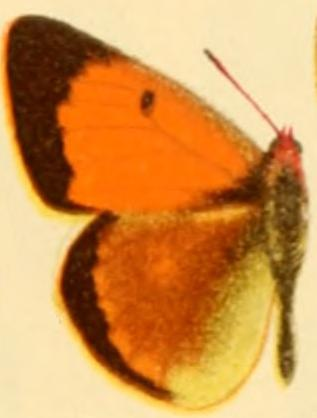

Scientific classification
- Kingdom: Animalia
- Phylum: Arthropoda
- Class: Insecta
- Order: Lepidoptera
- Family: Pieridae
- Genus: Colias
- Species: C. caucasica
- Subspecies: C. c. balcanica

Trinomial name
- Colias caucasica balcanica Rebel, 1901

= Colias caucasica balcanica =

Subspecies of butterfly

Colias caucasica balcanica is a butterfly in the family Pieridae. It is the European subspecies of Colias caucasica. It is found in Bosnia and Herzegovina, Bulgaria, Serbia, Montenegro, North Macedonia and Greece. It used to be considered a distinct species (Colias balcanica).

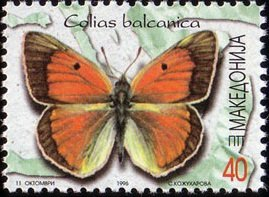
Balkan Clouded Yellow (Colias caucasica balcanica).
