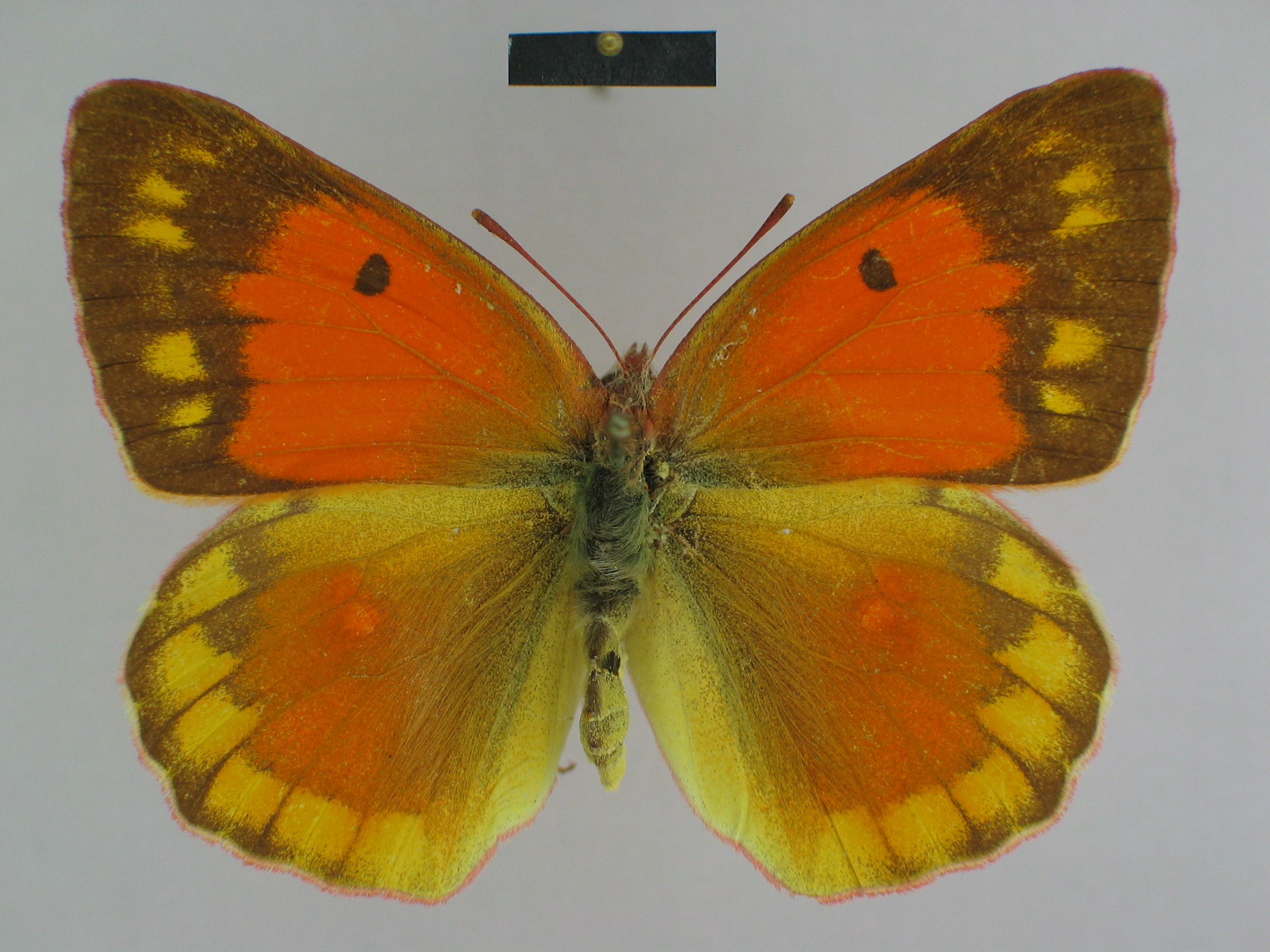
- Colias caucasica caucasica female dorsal side
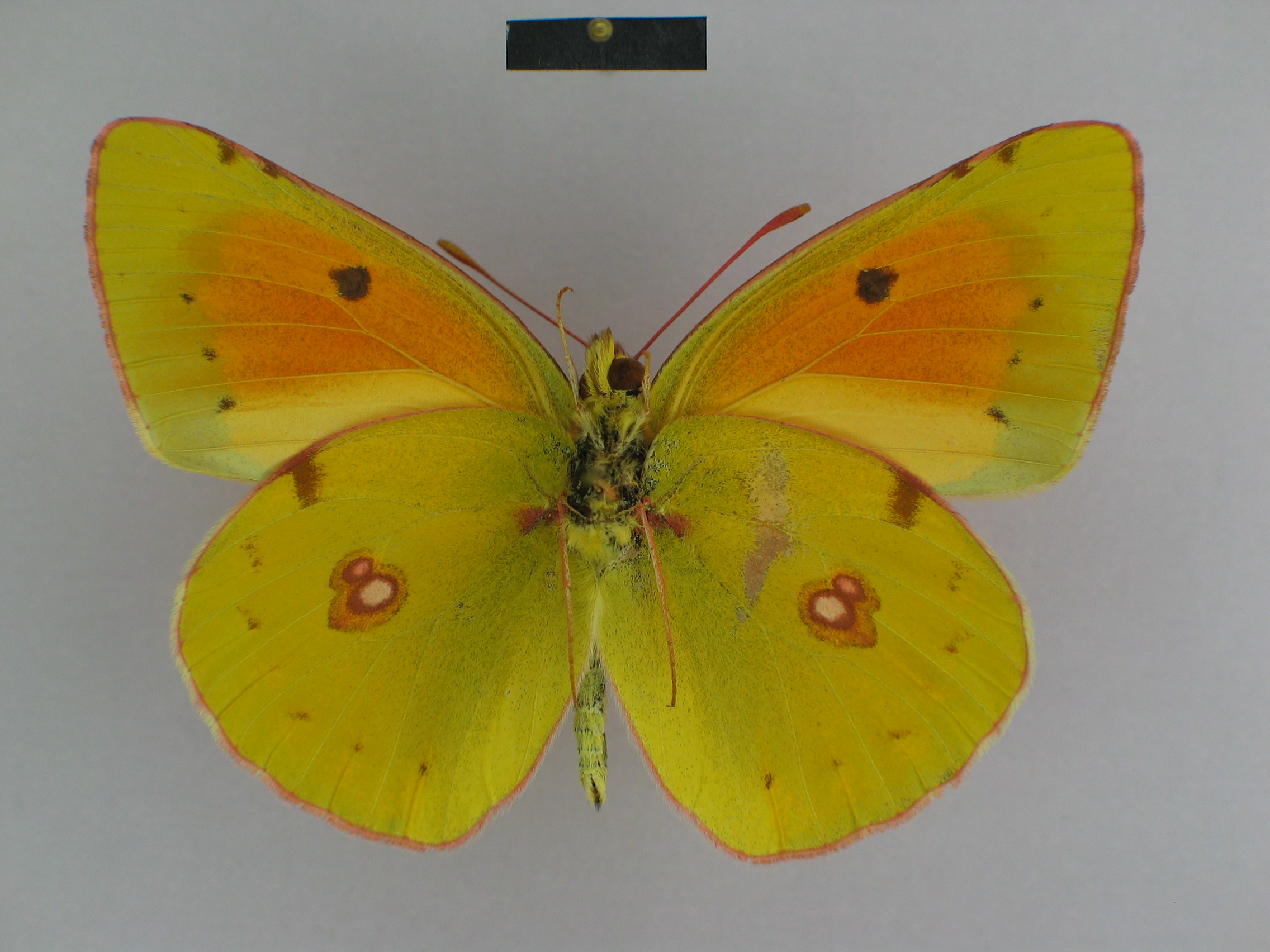
- Colias caucasica caucasica male ventral side

Scientific classification
- Kingdom: Animalia
- Phylum: Arthropoda
- Class: Insecta
- Order: Lepidoptera
- Family: Pieridae
- Genus: Colias
- Species: C. caucasica

Binomial name
- Colias caucasica Staudinger, 1871

Synonyms
- Colias caucasica anna Gerhard, 1882; Colias caucasica olga Romanoff, 1882; Colias caucasica alba Rühl, [1893]

= Colias caucasica =

Balkan clouded yellow

Species of butterfly

Colias caucasica, the Balkan clouded yellow, is a butterfly in the family Pieridae. It is found in the western Caucasus, in northeastern Turkey, and in the Balkan Peninsula.

== Description ==
Similar to but larger and more deeply orange red than Colias myrmidone, the distal margin being more broadly black; on the underside, which is similar to that of C. myrmidone, the very large central double spot of the hindwing is prominent. The female is mostly yellowish white, rarely orange red, bearing small light submarginal spots.

== Biology ==
The larvae feed on Cytisus and Astragalus caucasicus.

== Subspecies ==
- Colias caucasica caucasica
- Colias caucasica balcanica Rebel, 1901 - may be a full species (Colias balcanica)
