= Gornji Lajkovac =

Coordinates: 44.1742°N 20.0972°E

- Village (Selo)
- Interactive map of Gornji Lajkovac
- Country: Serbia
- District: Kolubara
- Municipality: Mionica
- Time zone: UTC+1 (CET)
  - Summer (DST): UTC+2 (CEST)

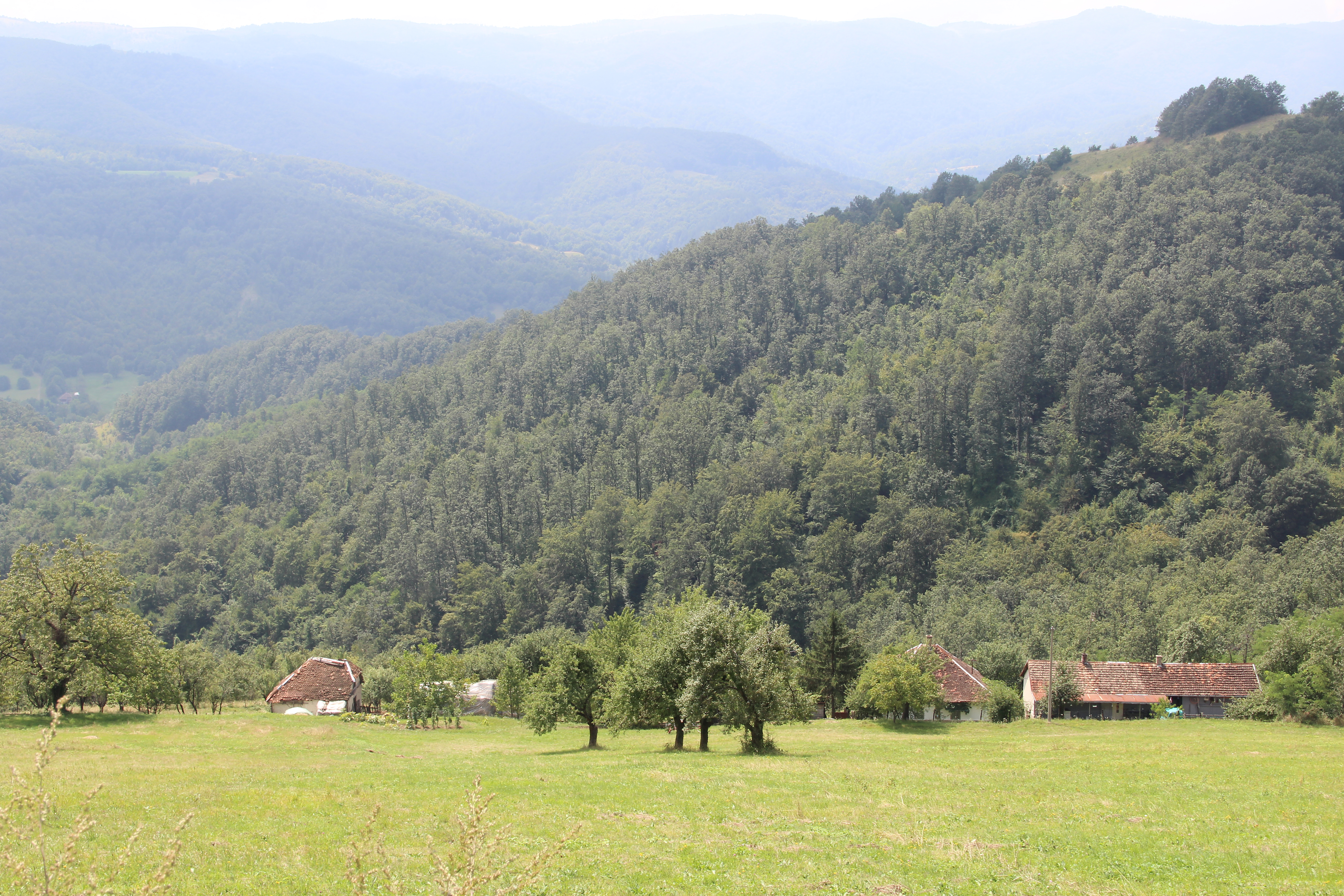
Maljen - Western Serbia - village of Gornji Lajkovac - Look at the northeast slopes of the mountain Maljen 10

Gornji Lajkovac is a village situated in Mionica municipality in Serbia.
