= Radobić =

Coordinates: 44°16′29″N 20°03′39″E

- Village (Selo)
- Interactive map of Radobić
- Country: Serbia
- District: Kolubara District
- Municipality: Mionica
- Time zone: UTC+1 (CET)
  - Summer (DST): UTC+2 (CEST)

Radobić is a village situated in Mionica municipality in Serbia.

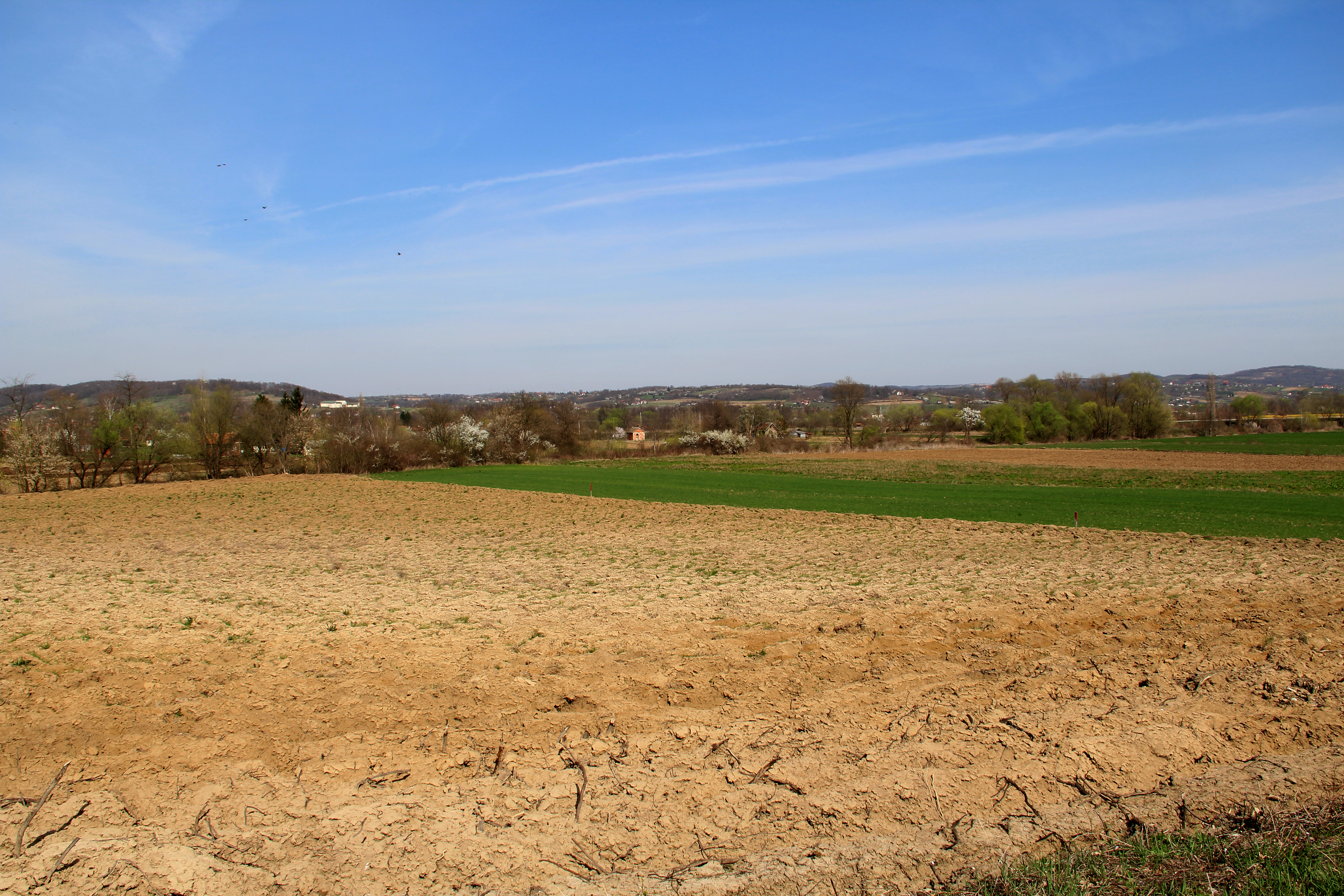
Radobic - panorama

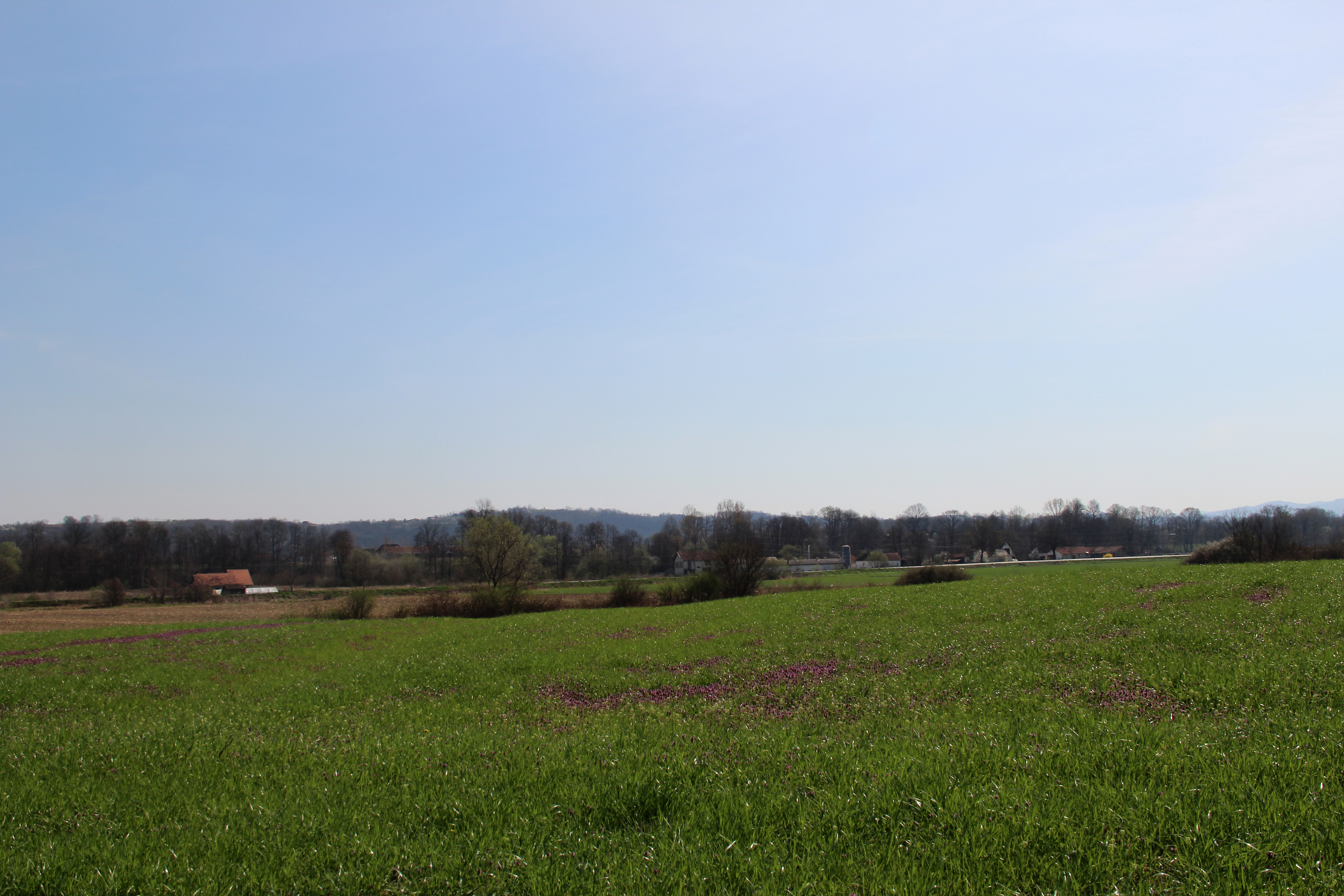
Radobic - panorama

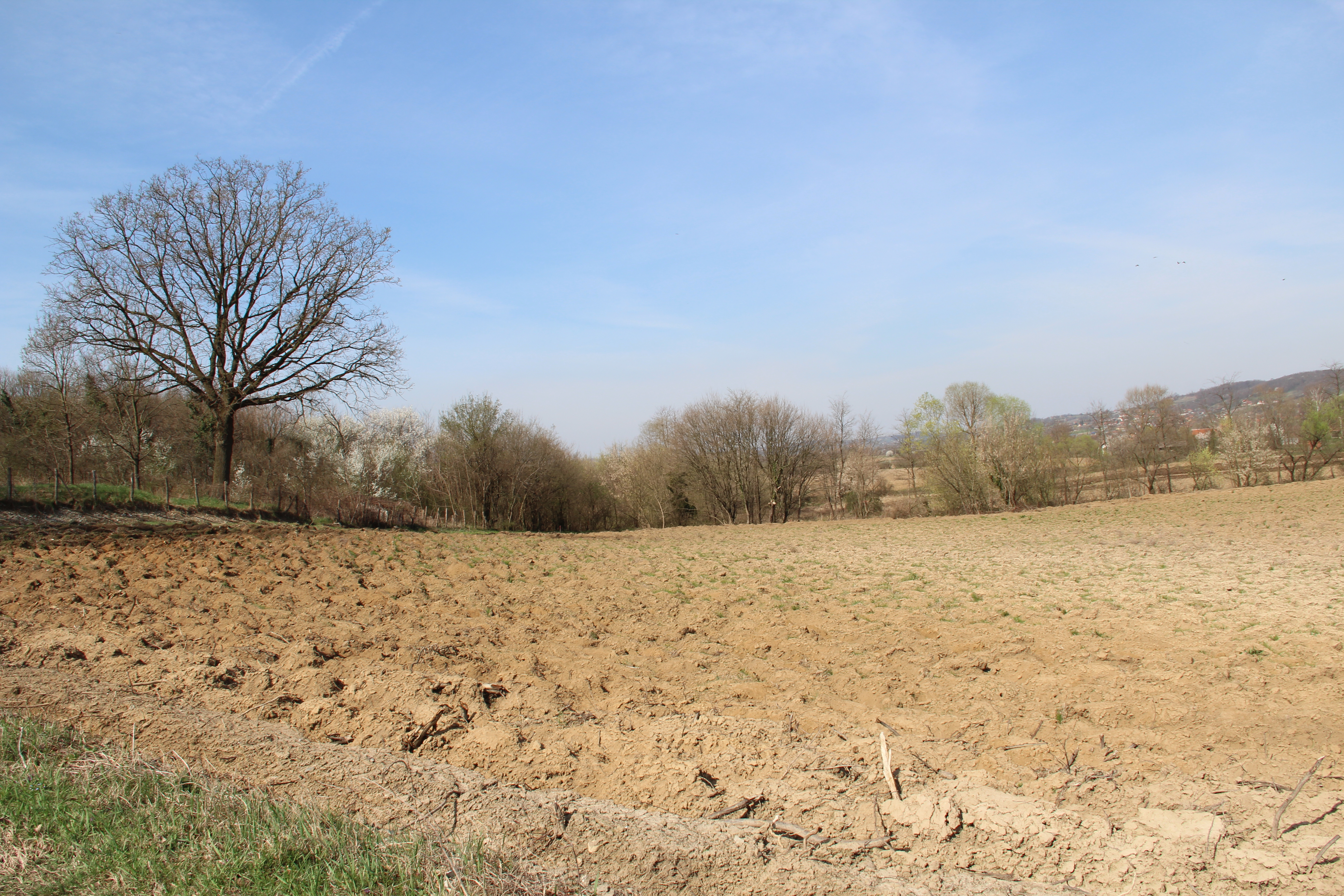
Radobic - panorama

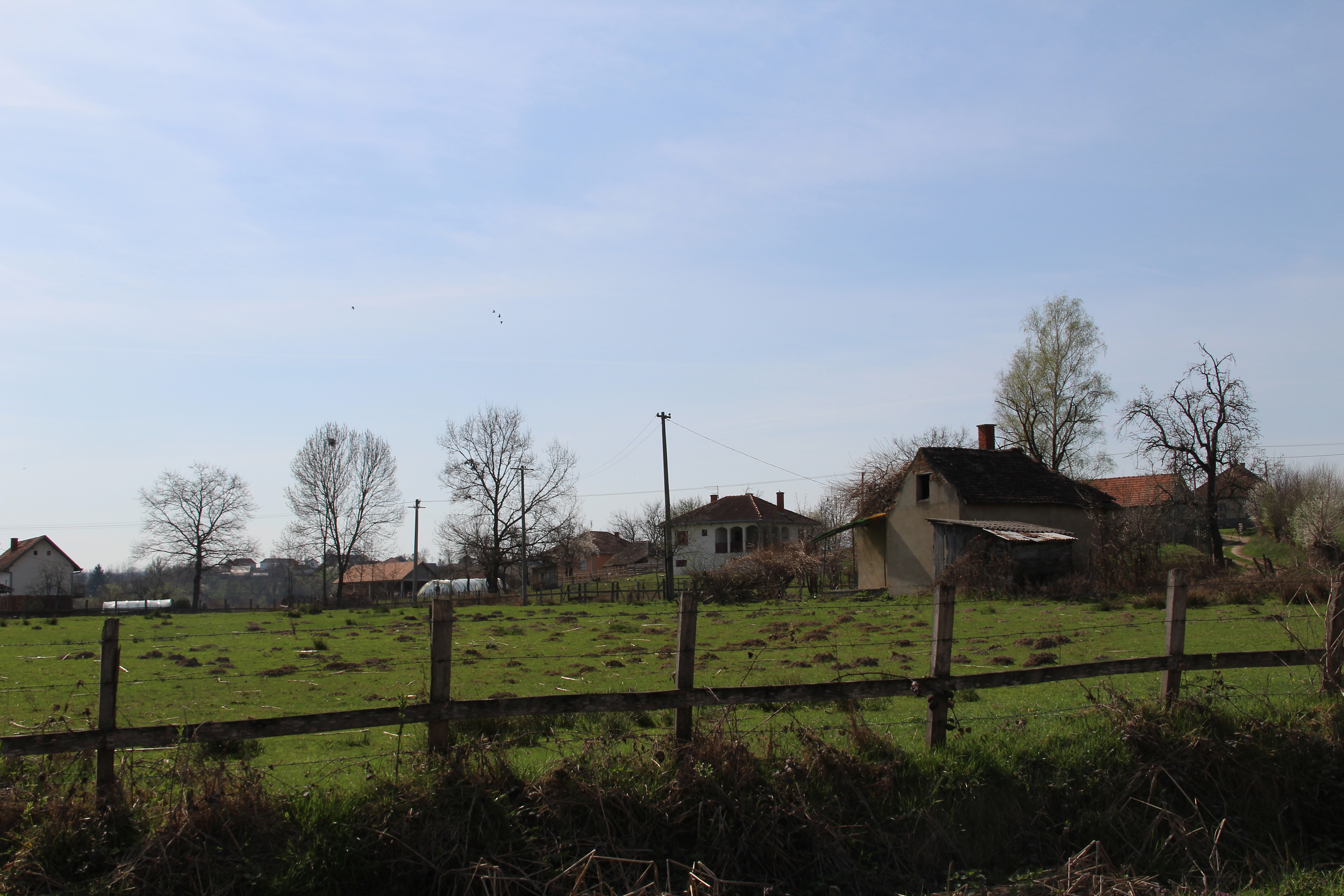
Radobic - rural household

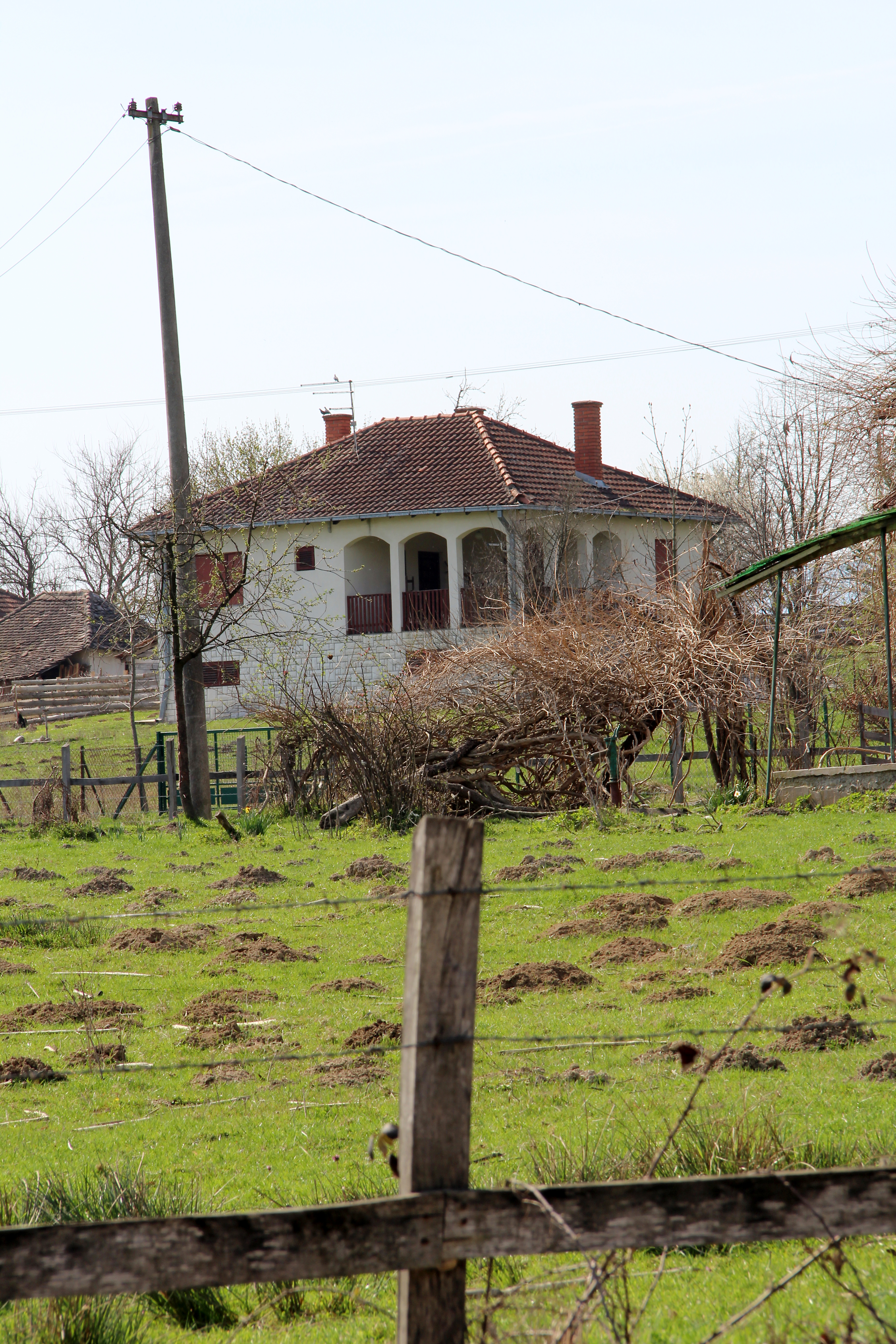
Radobic - rural household

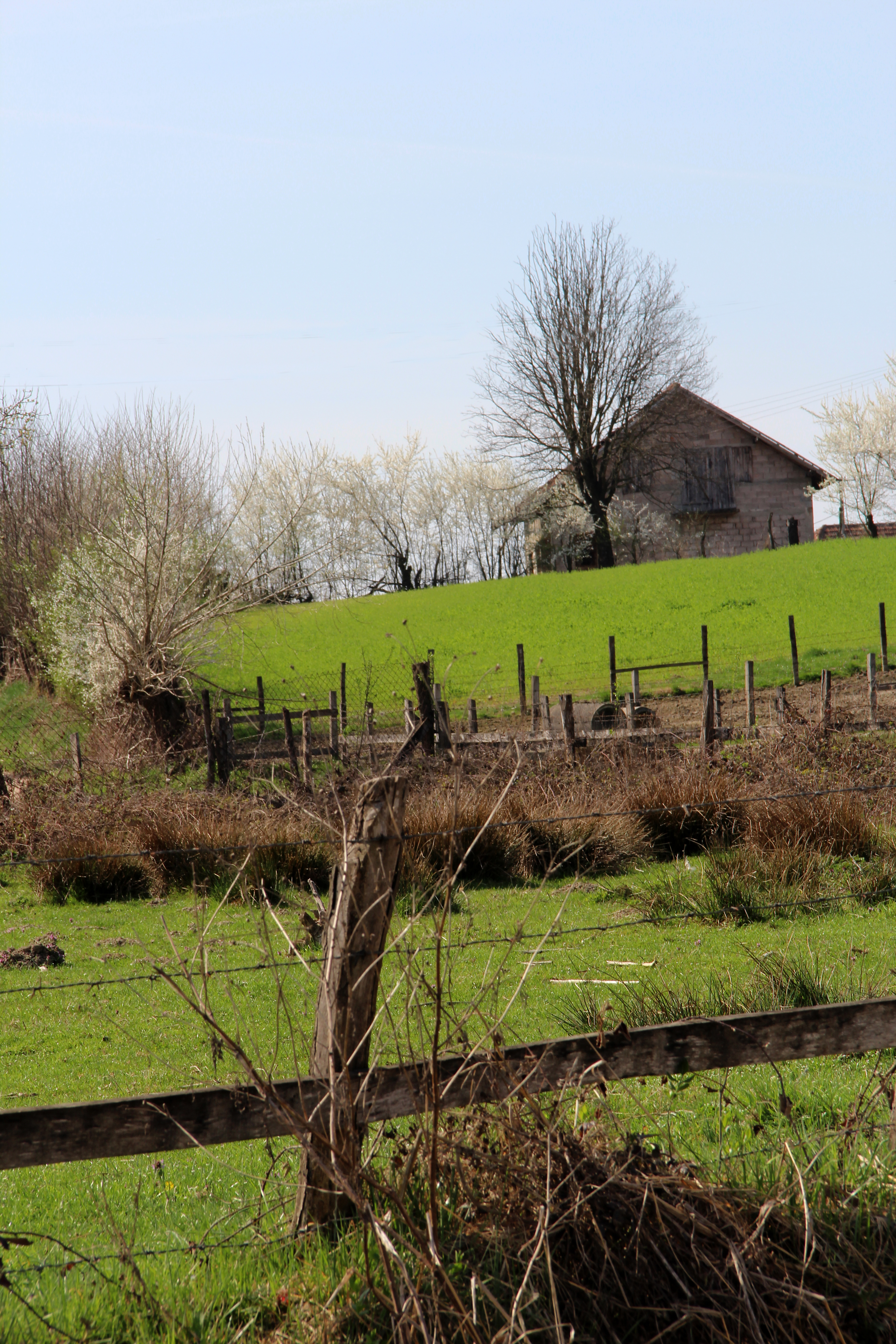
Radobic - rural household
