= Đurđevac (Mionica) =

Đurđevac Ђурђевац
- Village (Selo)
- Location within Serbia
- Coordinates: 44°15′22″N 20°01′16″E
- Country: Serbia
- District: Kolubara
- Municipality: Mionica
- Time zone: UTC+1 (CET)
  - Summer (DST): UTC+2 (CEST)

Đurđevac is a village situated in Mionica municipality in Serbia.

== Population ==
1948	1953	1961	1971	1981	1991	2002	2011	2022
553	558	490	450	412	323	297	216	162

== Gallery ==
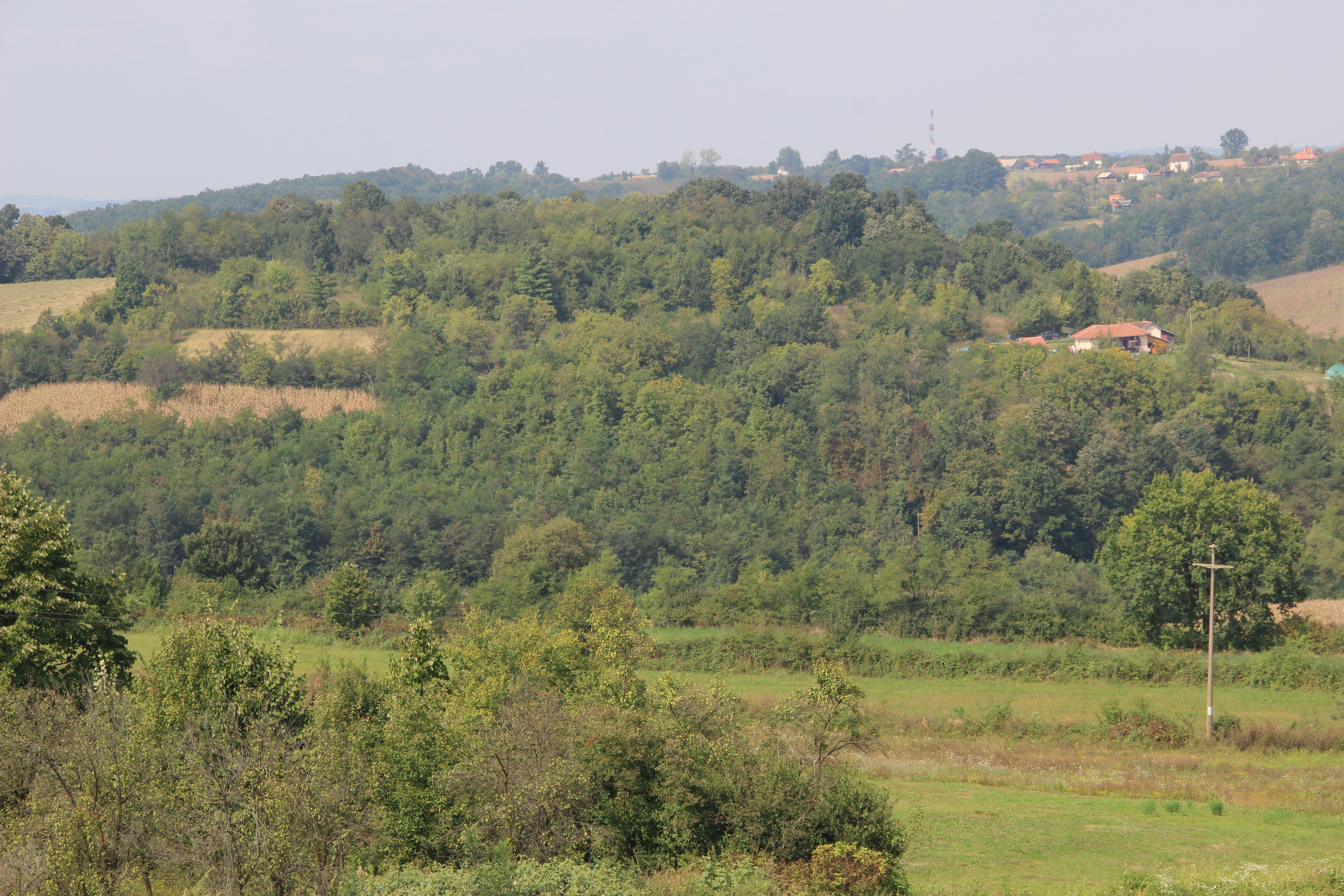
Đurđevac - panorama

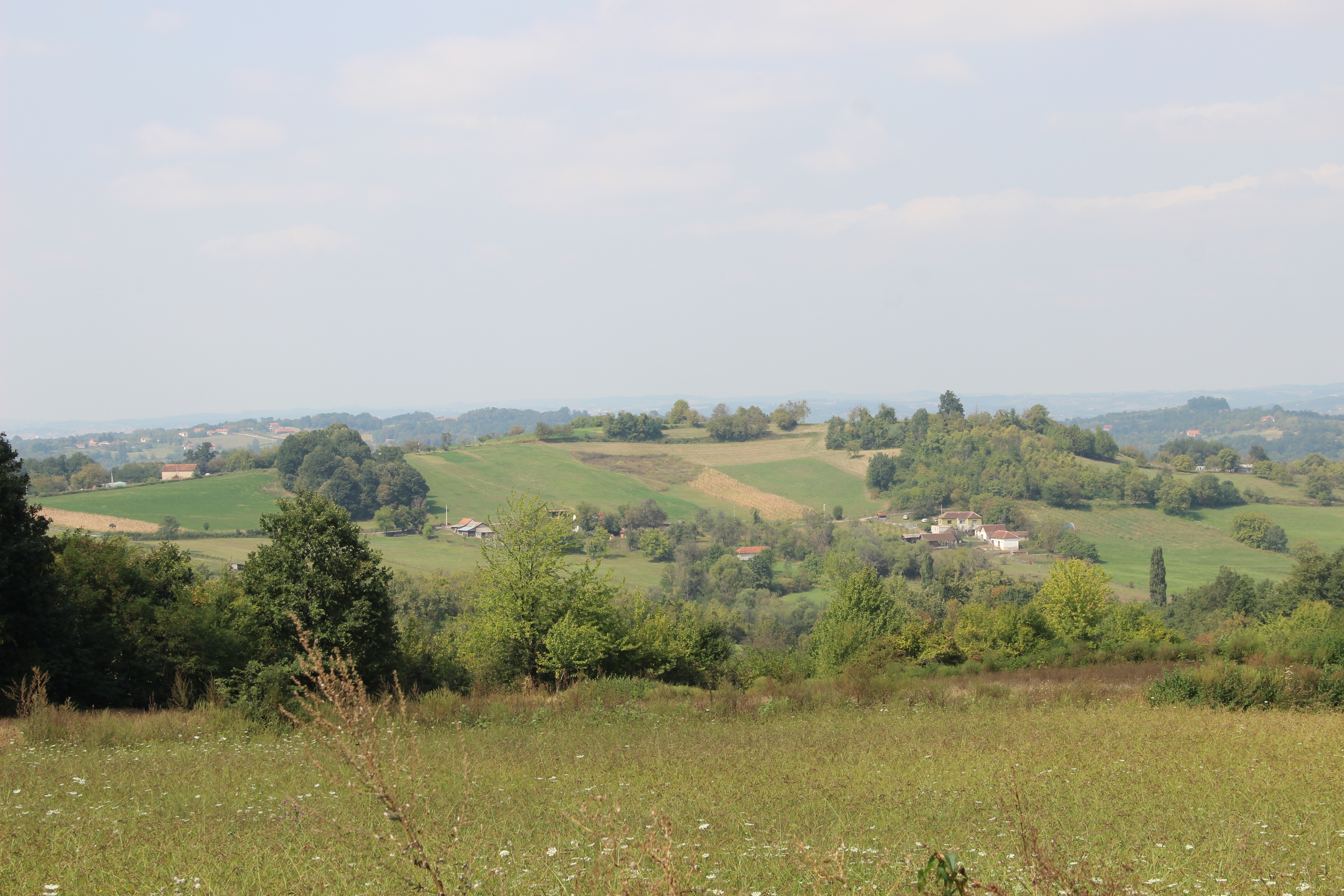
Đurđevac - panorama

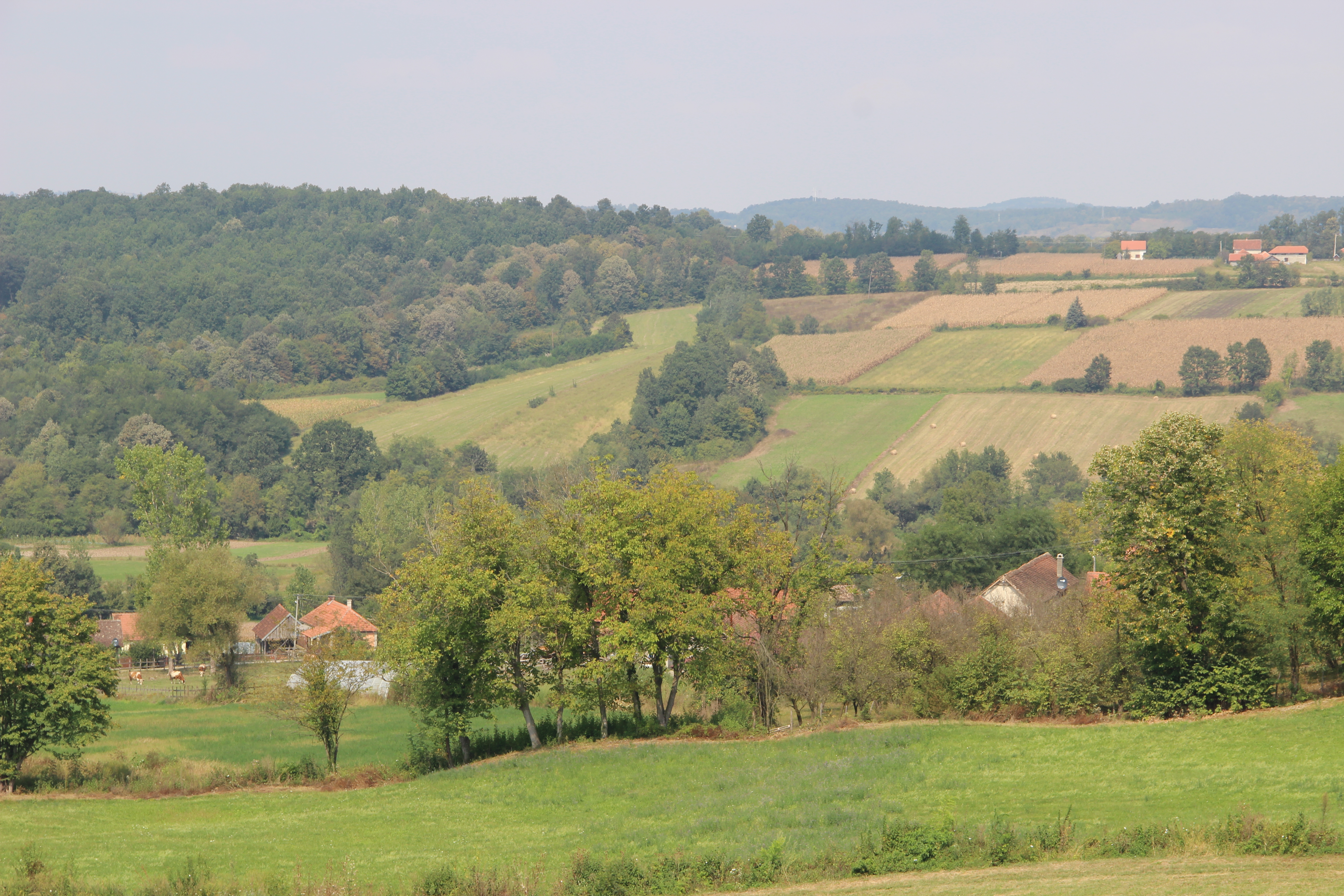
Đurđevac - panorama

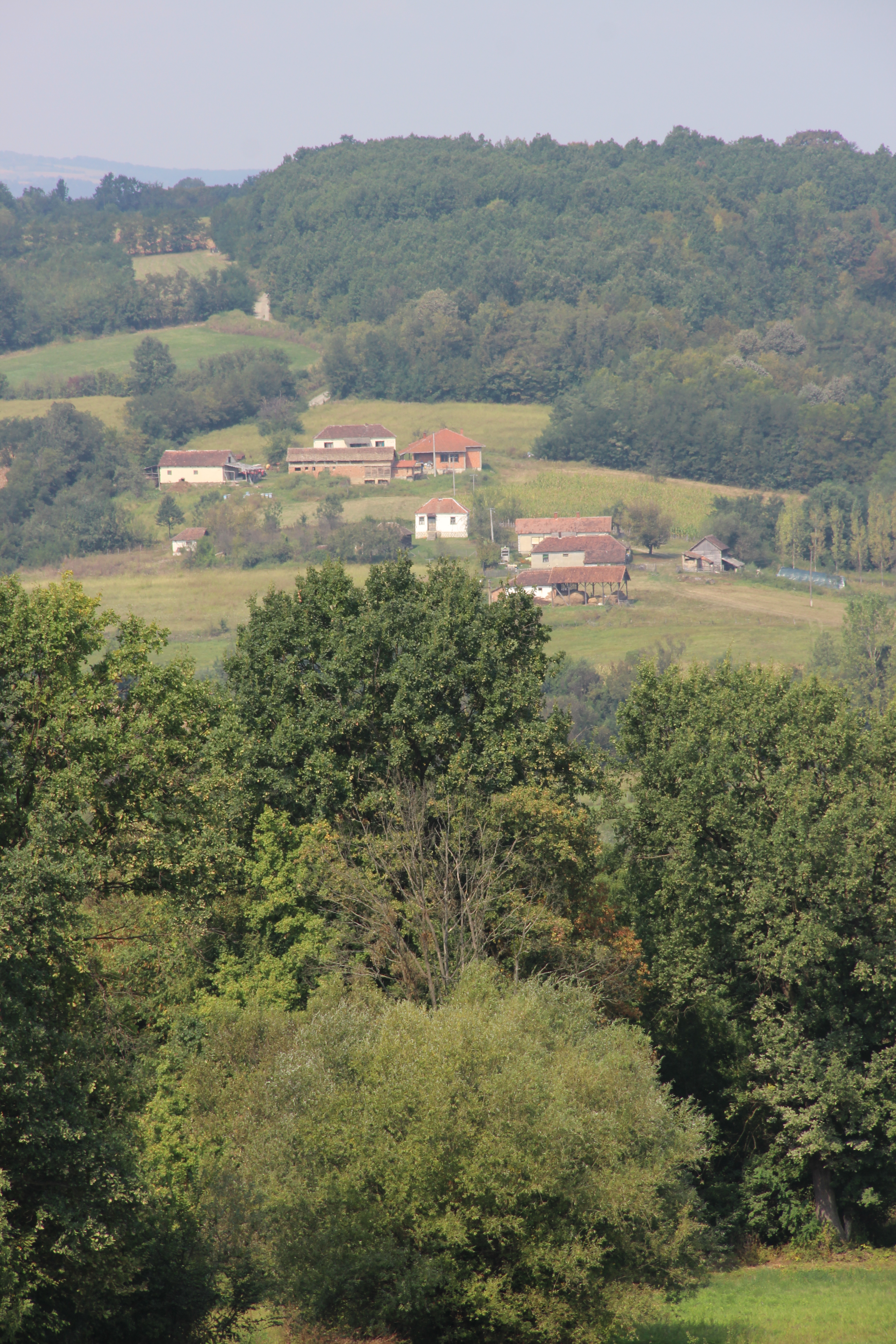
Đurđevac - panorama

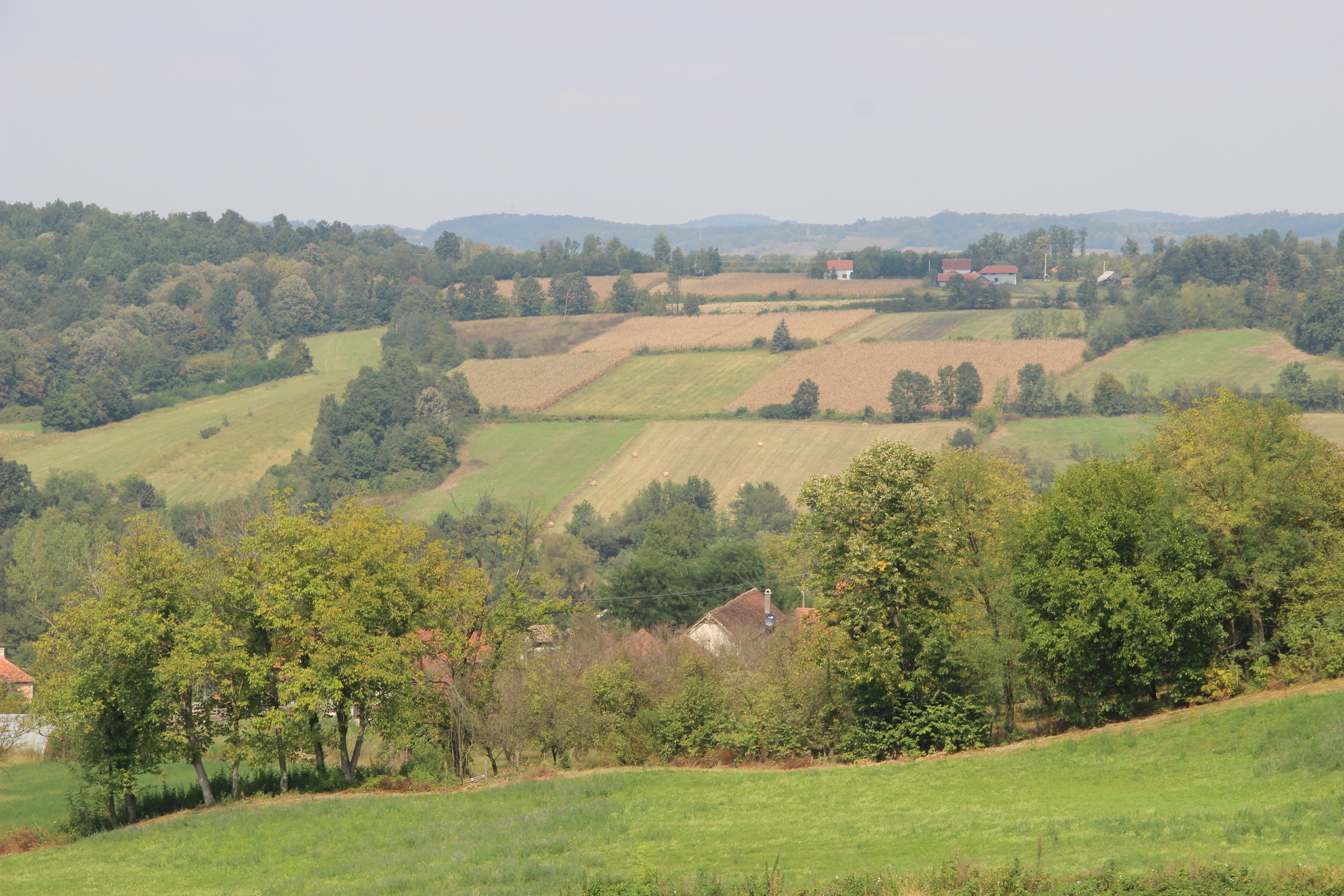
Đurđevac - panorama

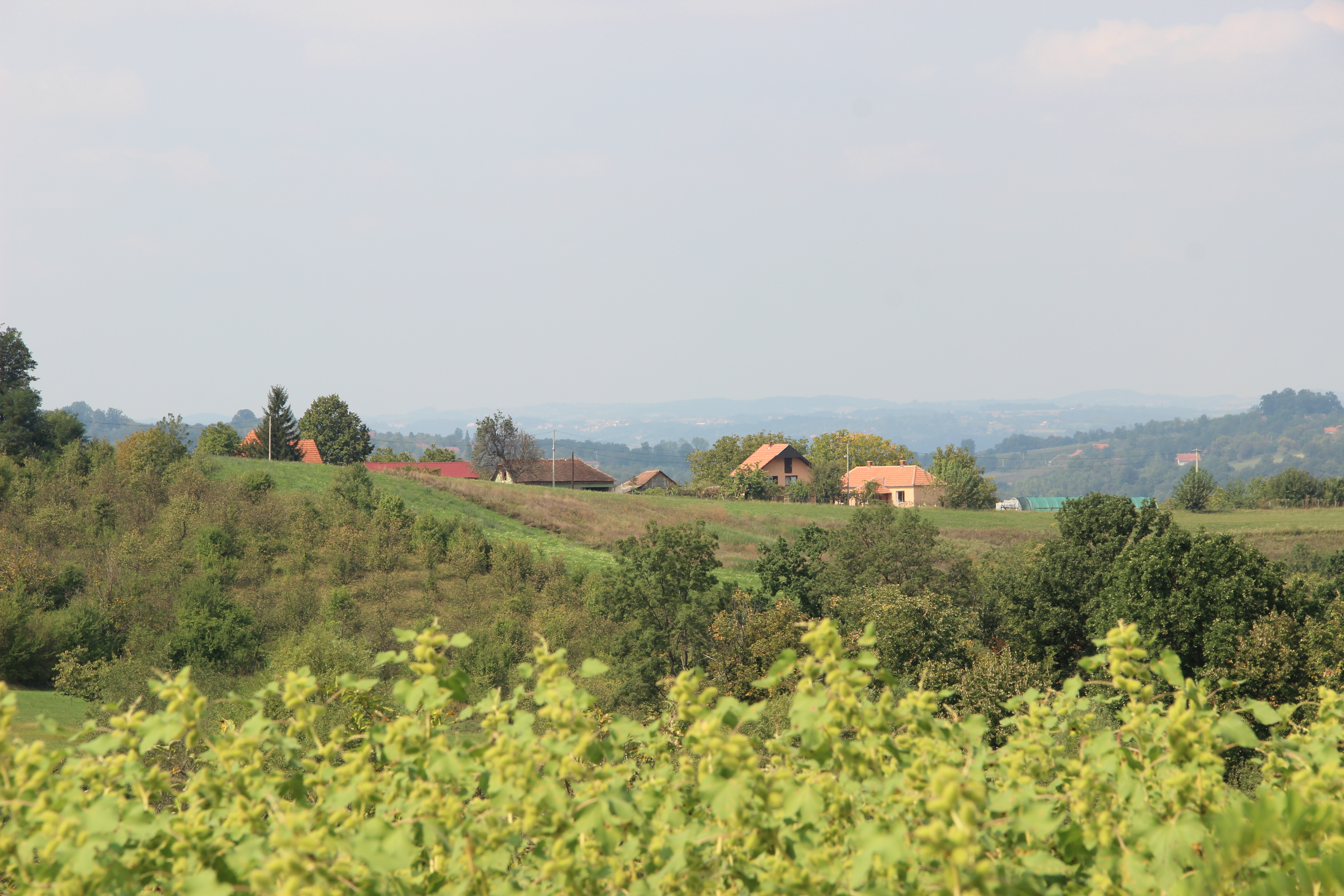
Đurđevac - panorama
