= Gunjica =

Coordinates: 44.2081°N 20.1631°E

- Village (Selo)
- Interactive map of Gunjica
- Country: Serbia
- District: Kolubara District
- Municipality: Mionica
- Time zone: UTC+1 (CET)
  - Summer (DST): UTC+2 (CEST)

Gunjica is a village situated in Mionica municipality in Serbia.
