= Vrtiglav =

Vrtiglav Вртиглав
- Village (Selo)
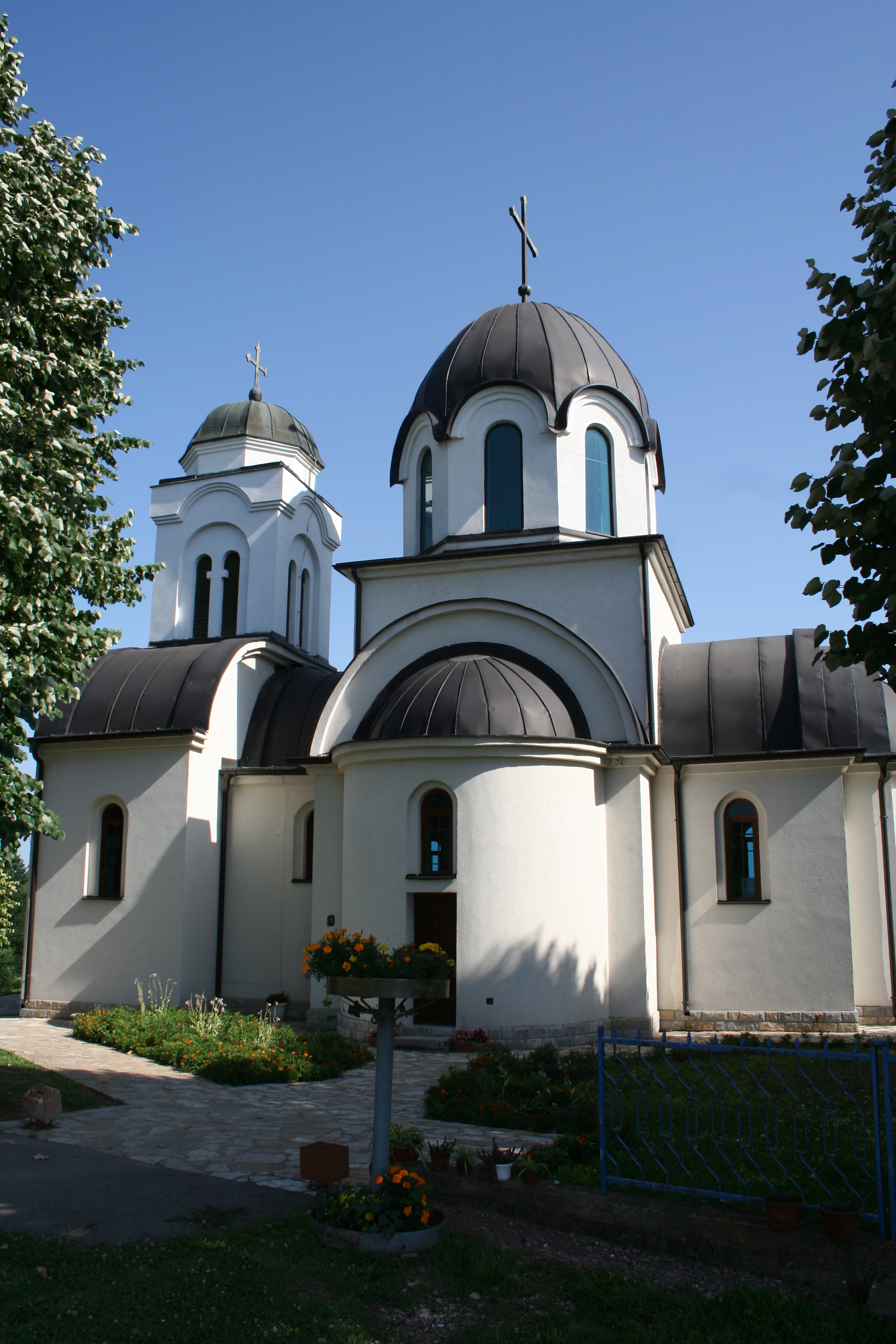
- Church of the Assembly of St. Archangel Gabriel in Vrtiglav

- Position of Vrtiglav
- Coordinates: 44°16′24″N 20°06′06″E
- Country: Serbia
- District: Kolubara District
- Municipality: Mionica

Population (2002)
  - Total: 414
- Time zone: UTC+1 (CET)
  - Summer (DST): UTC+2 (CEST)

Vrtiglav is a village situated in Mionica municipality in Serbia.
