= Sanković =

Coordinates: 44°15′27″N 20°02′37″E

- Village (Selo)
- Interactive map of Sanković
- Country: Serbia
- District: Kolubara District
- Municipality: Mionica
- Time zone: UTC+1 (CET)
  - Summer (DST): UTC+2 (CEST)

Sanković is a village situated in Mionica municipality in Serbia.

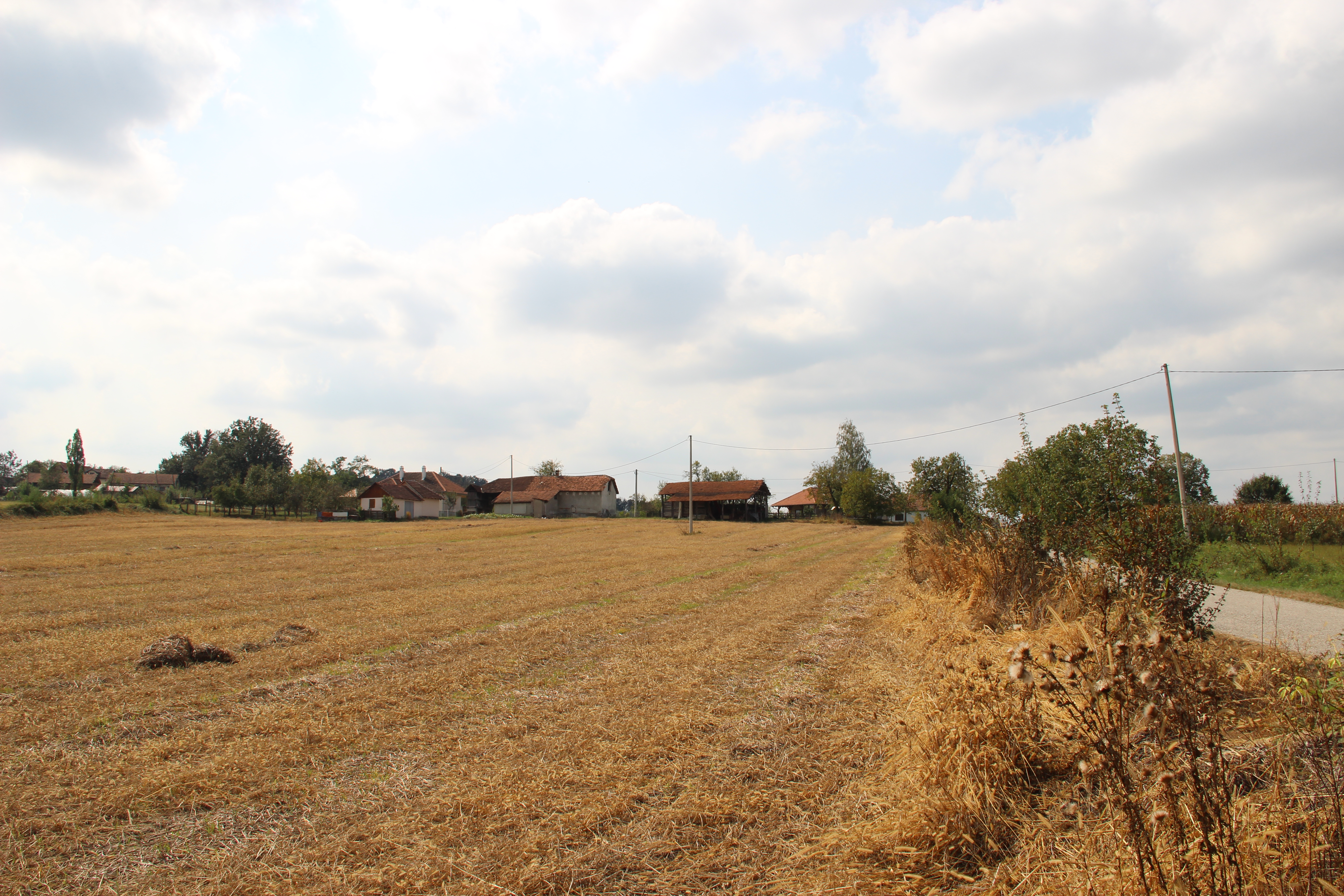
Sanković - panorama

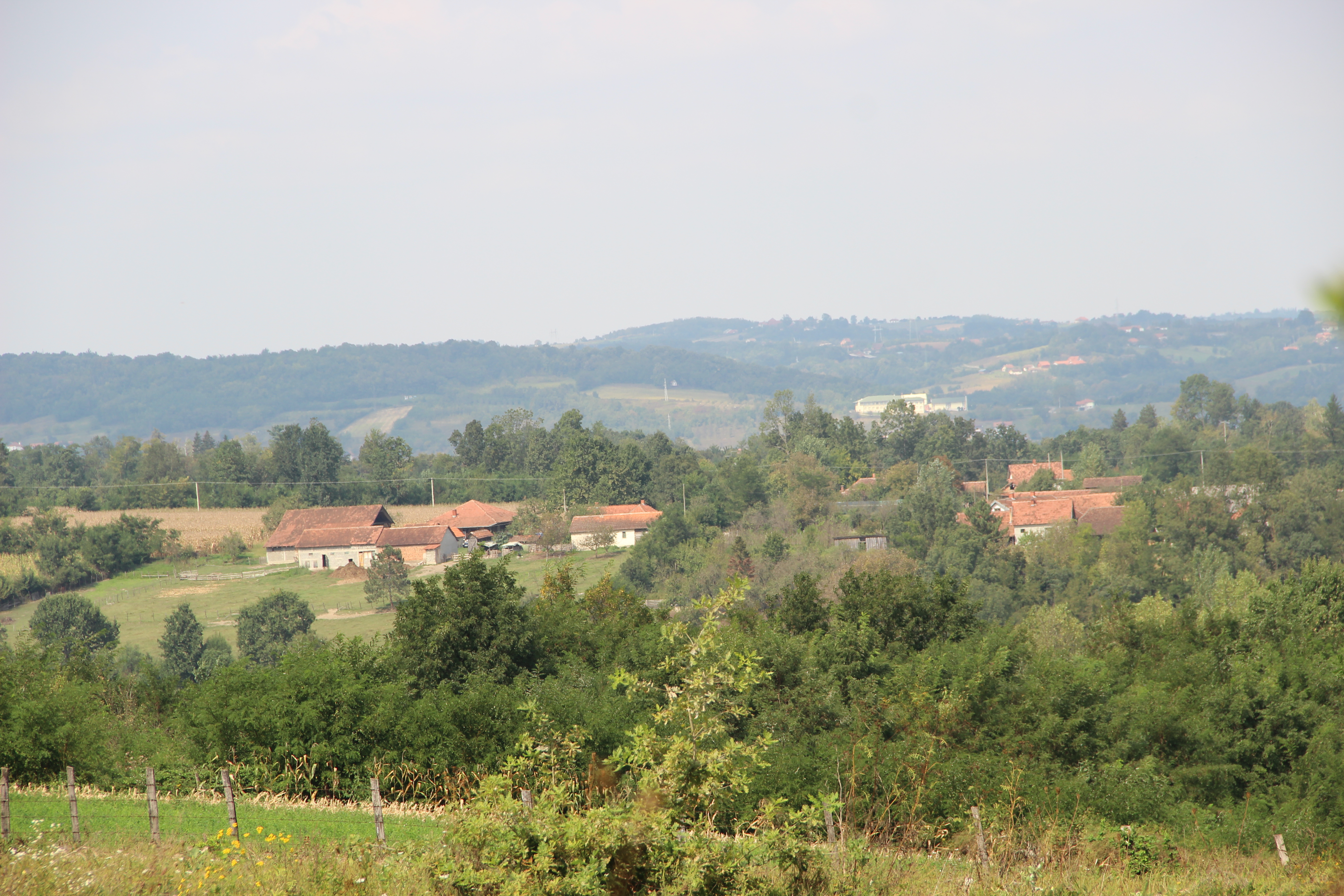
Sanković - panorama

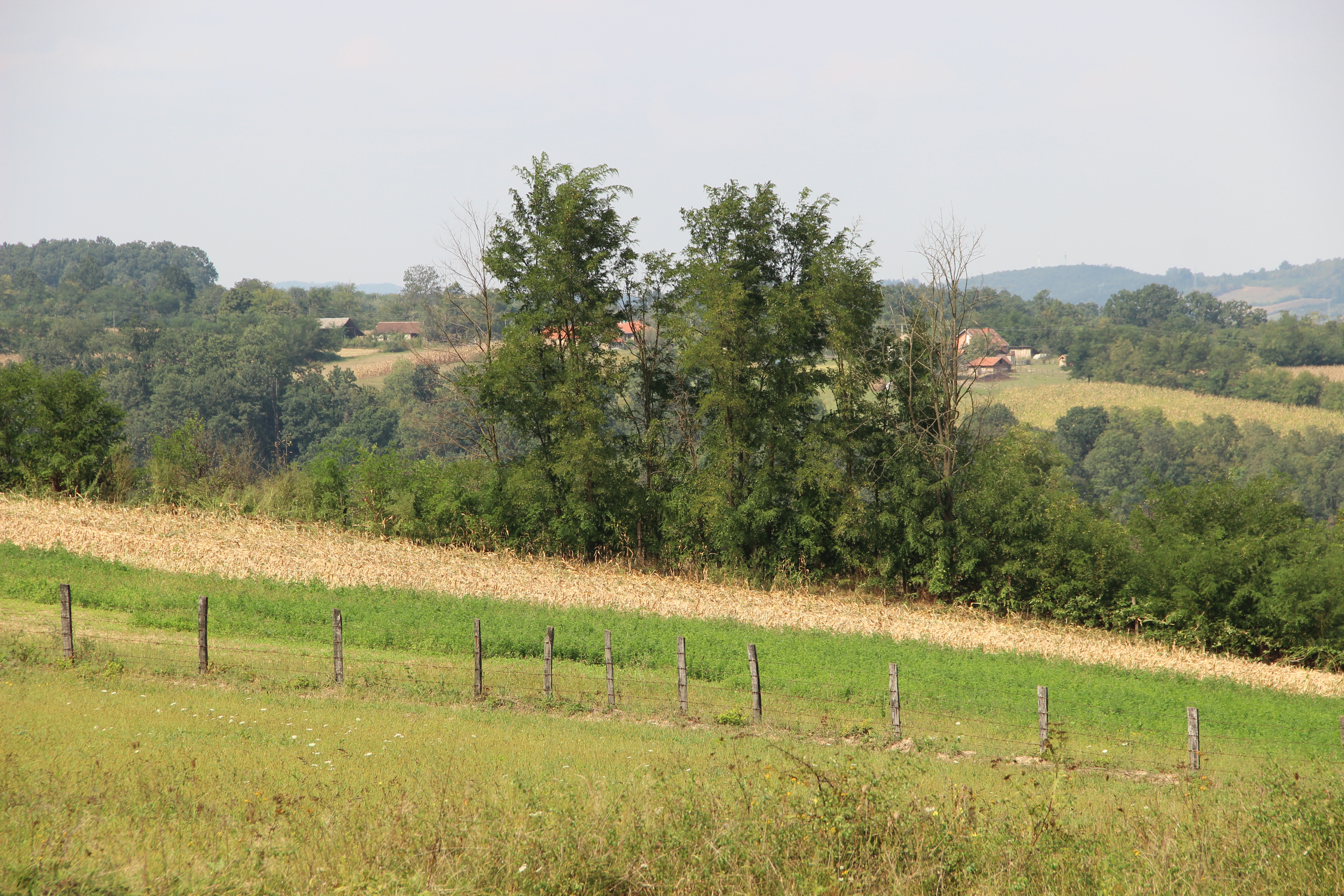
Sanković - panorama

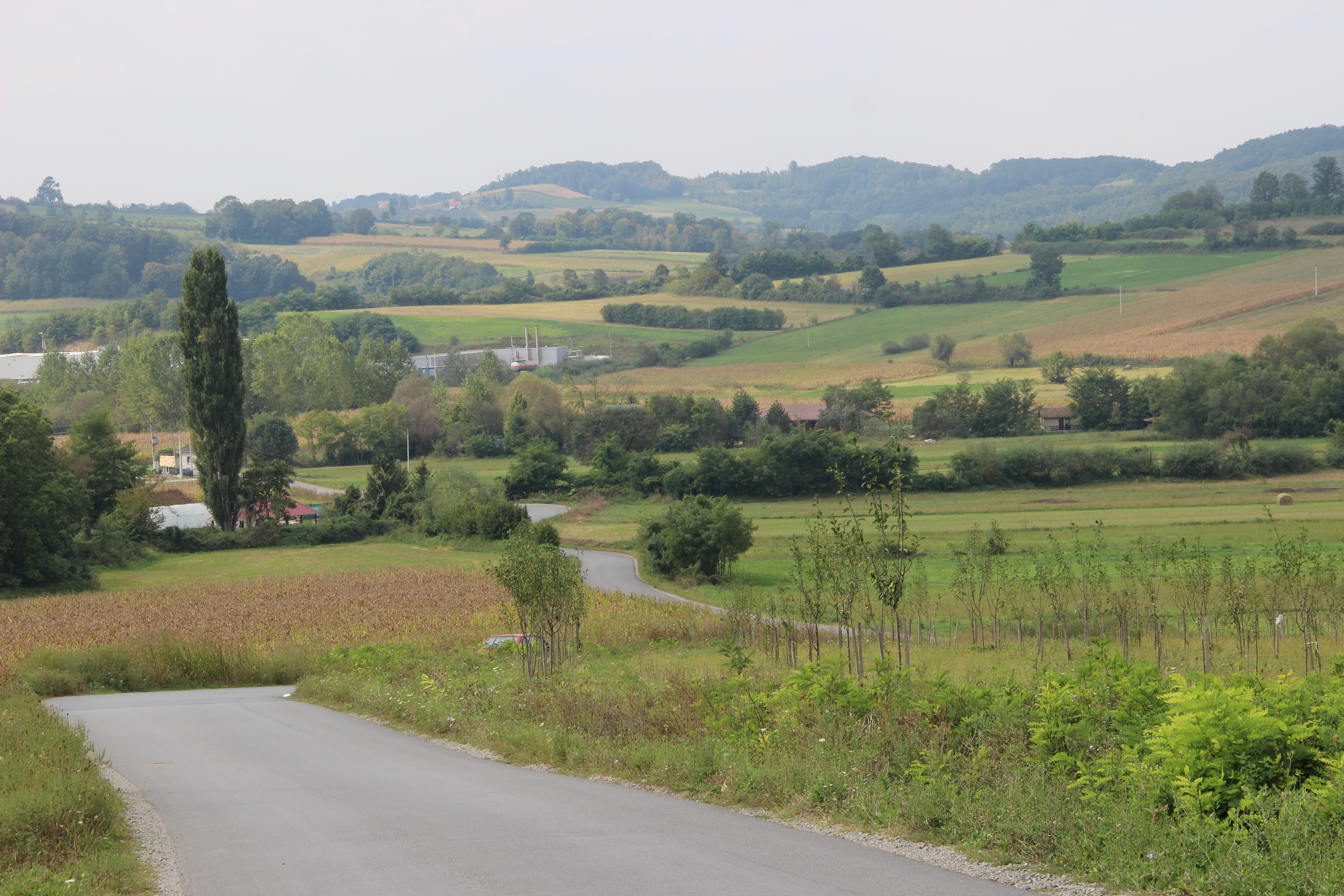
Sanković - panorama

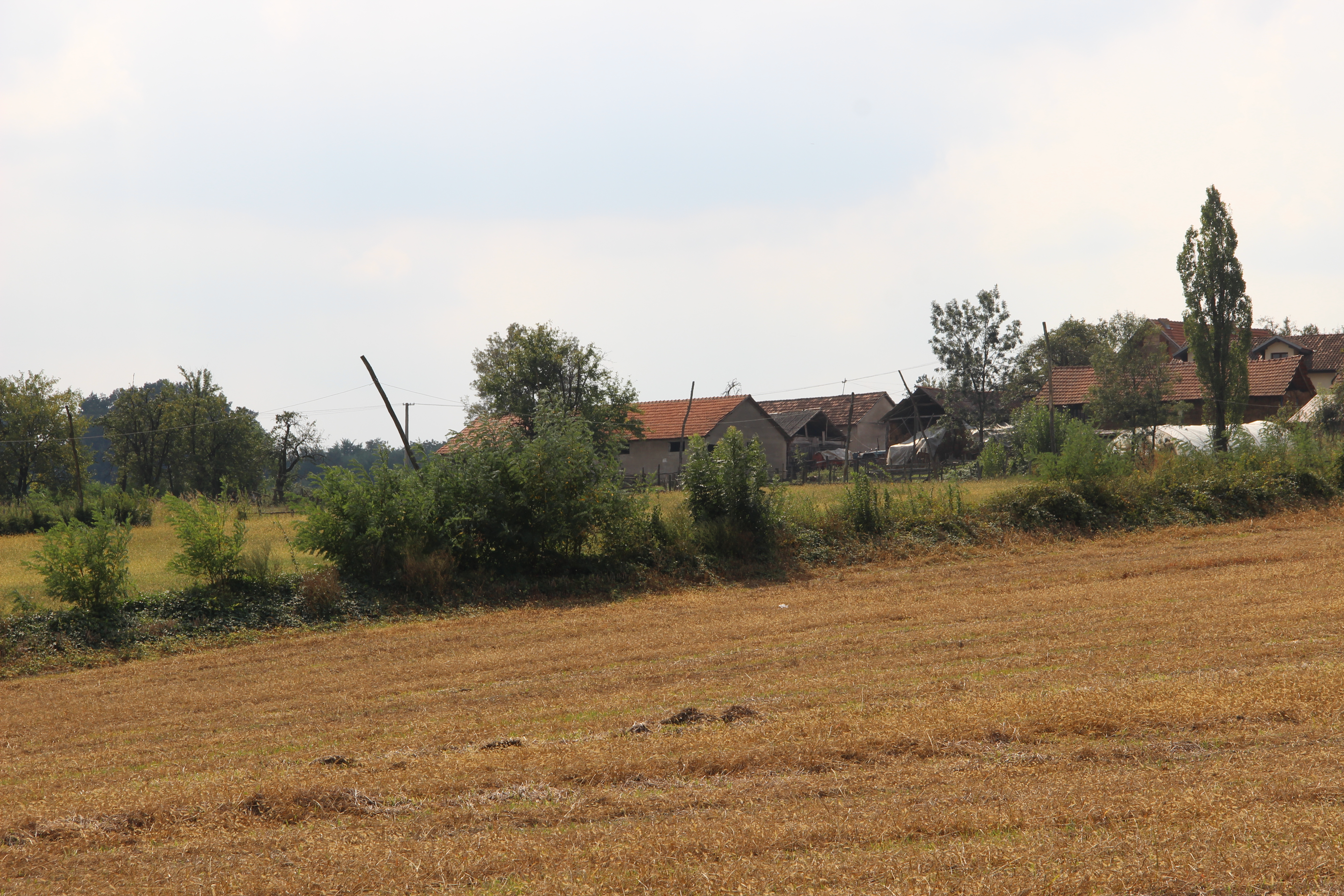
Sanković - panorama

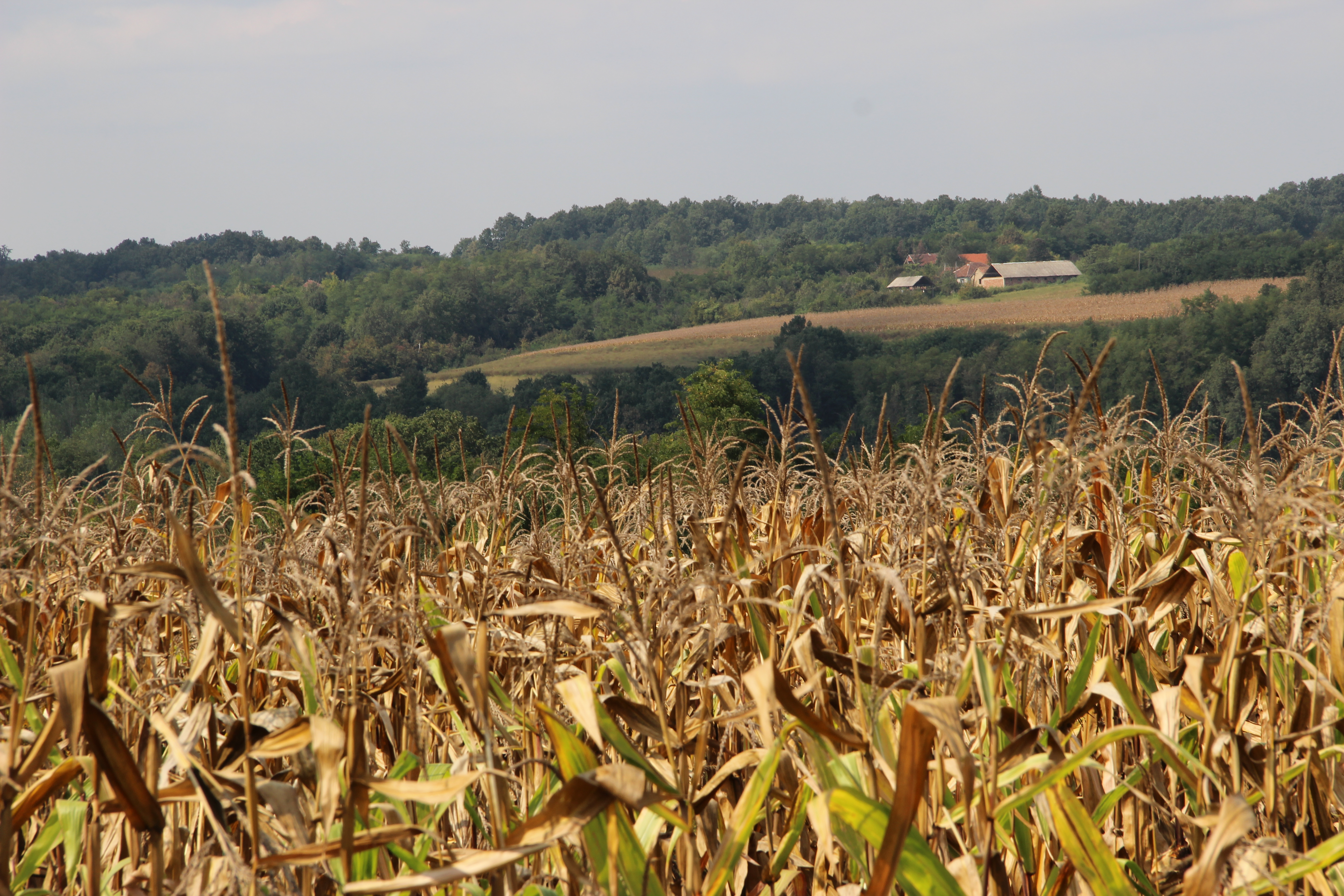
Sanković - panorama
