= Velika Marišta =

- Village (Selo)
- Location within Serbia
- Coordinates: 44°17′12″N 20°07′36″E
- Country: Serbia
- District: Kolubara District
- Municipality: Mionica
- Time zone: UTC+1 (CET)
  - Summer (DST): UTC+2 (CEST)

Velika Marišta is a village situated in Mionica municipality in Serbia.
