= Šušeoka =

Coordinates: 44°16′25″N 20°05′10″E

- Village (Selo)
- Interactive map of Šušeoka
- Country: Serbia
- District: Kolubara District
- Municipality: Mionica
- Time zone: UTC+1 (CET)
  - Summer (DST): UTC+2 (CEST)

Šušeoka is a village situated in Mionica municipality in Serbia.

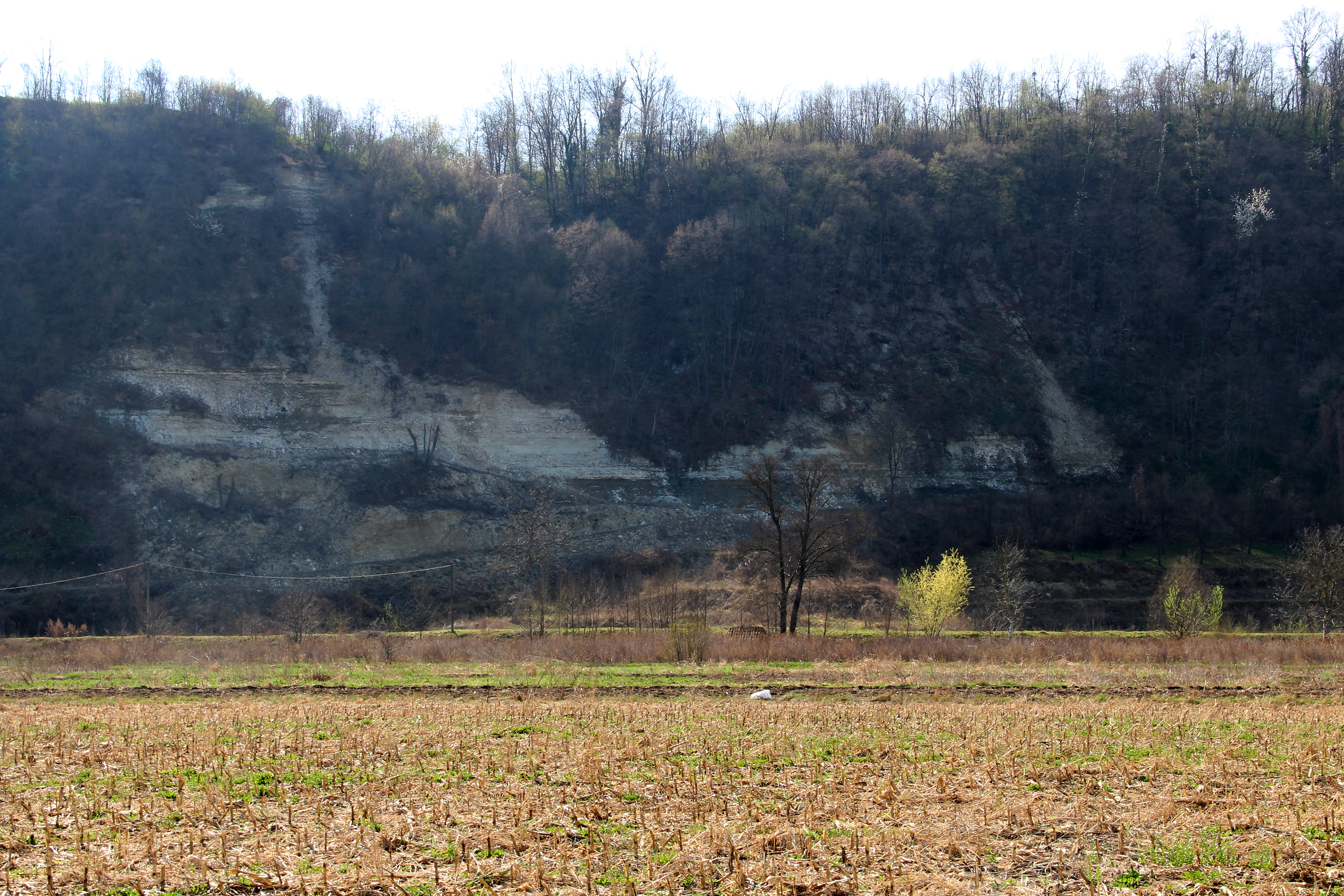
Village Suseoka - Locality Bela stena

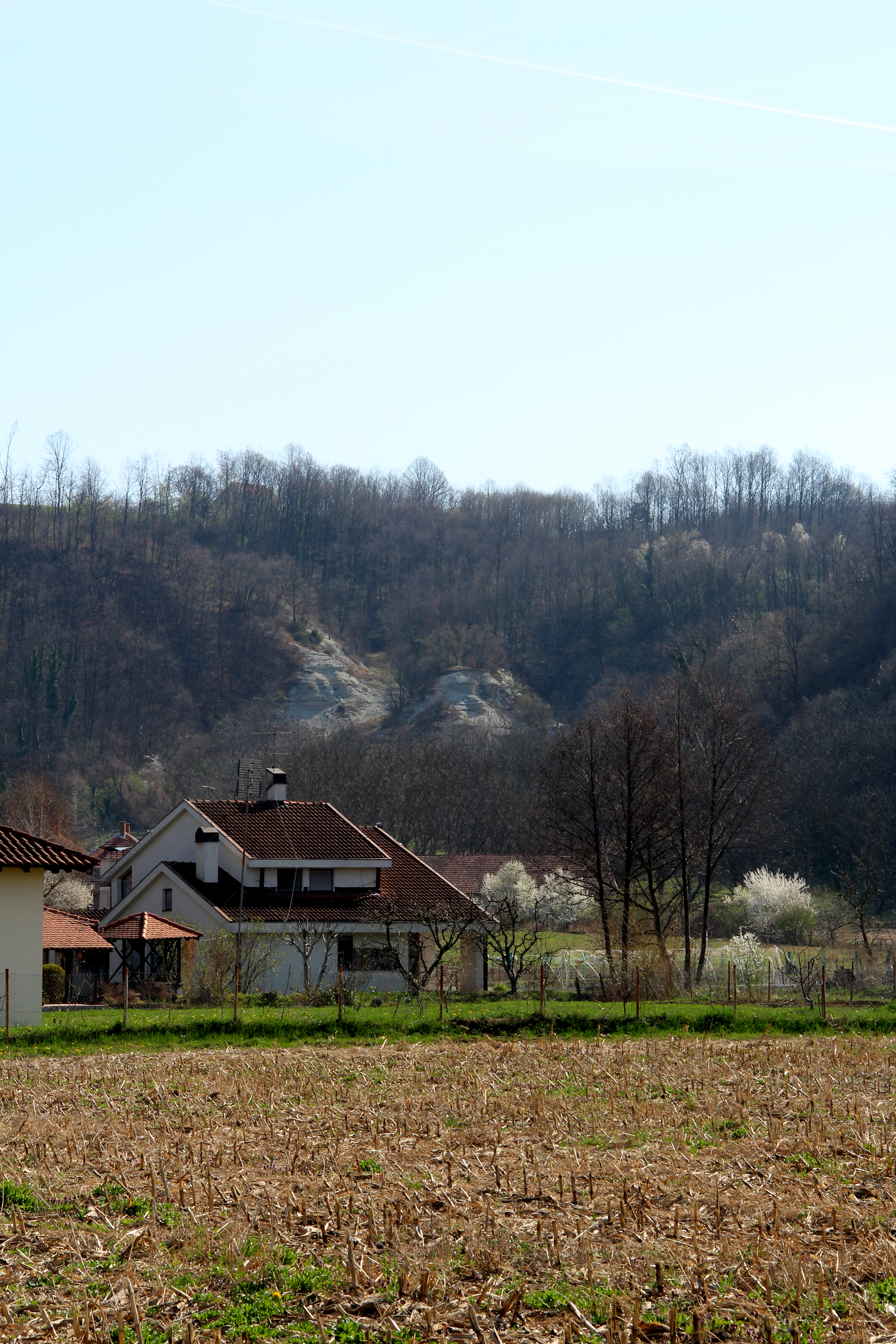
Village Suseoka - Locality Bela stena

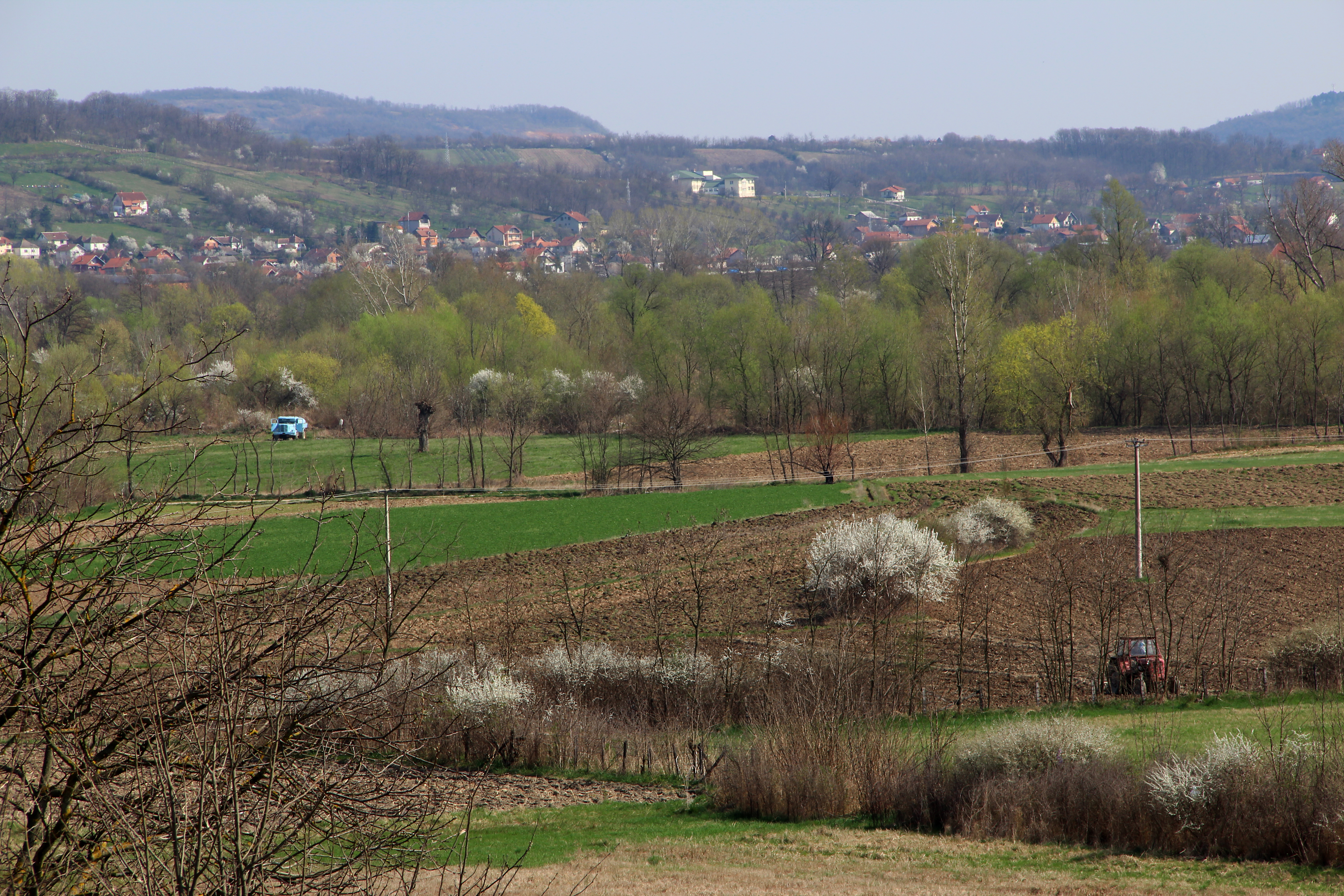
Village Suseoka - panorama

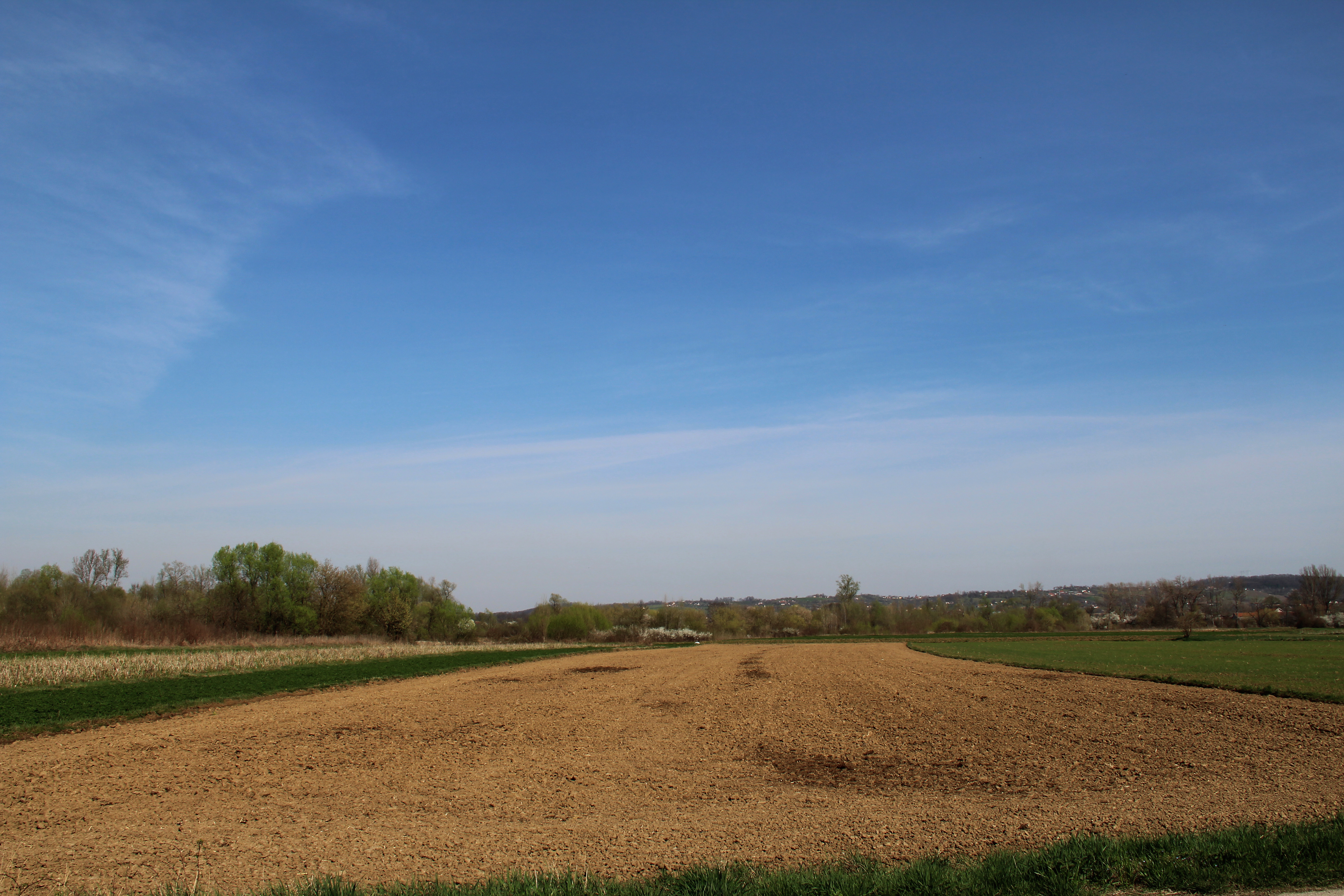
Village Suseoka - panorama

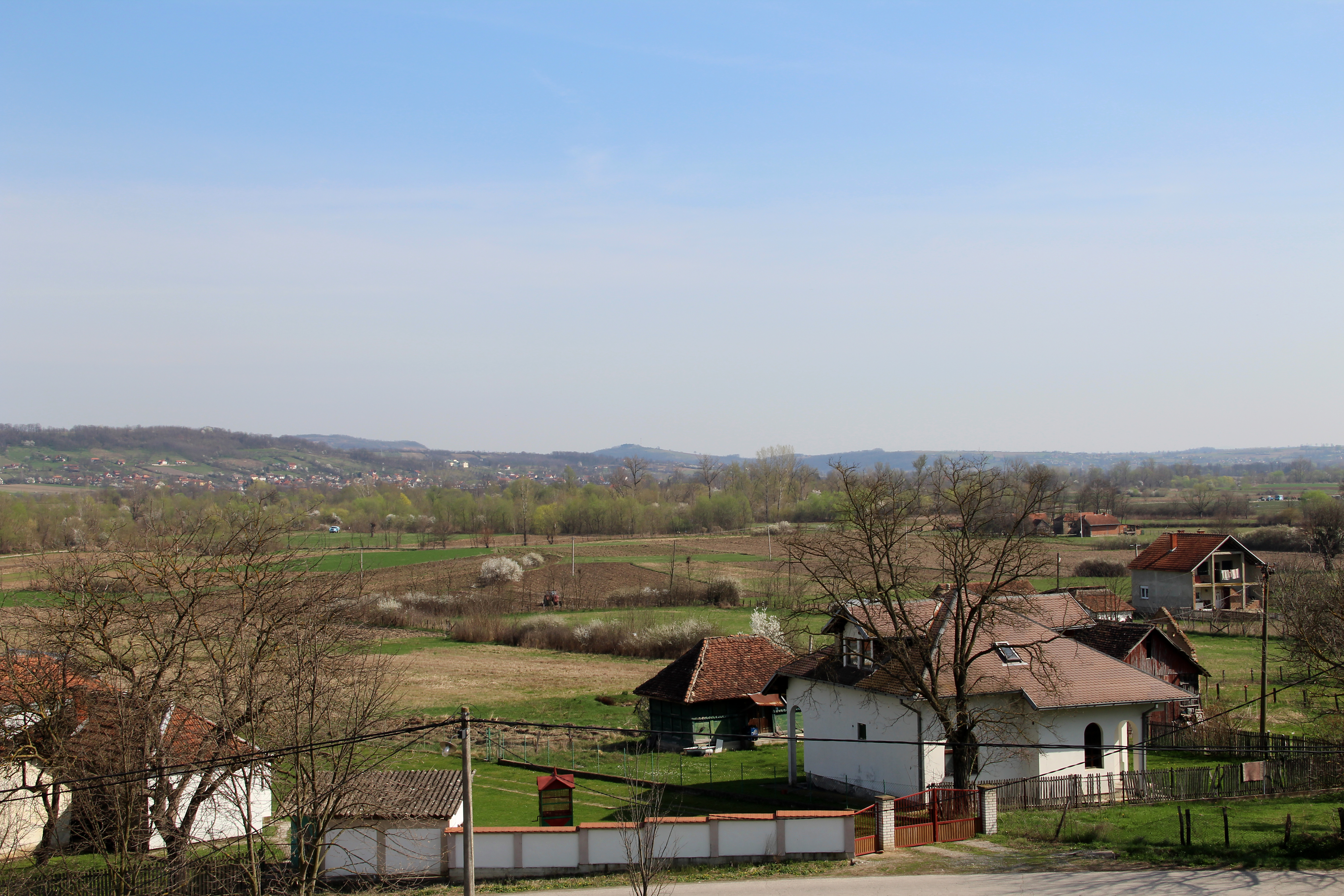
Village Suseoka - panorama

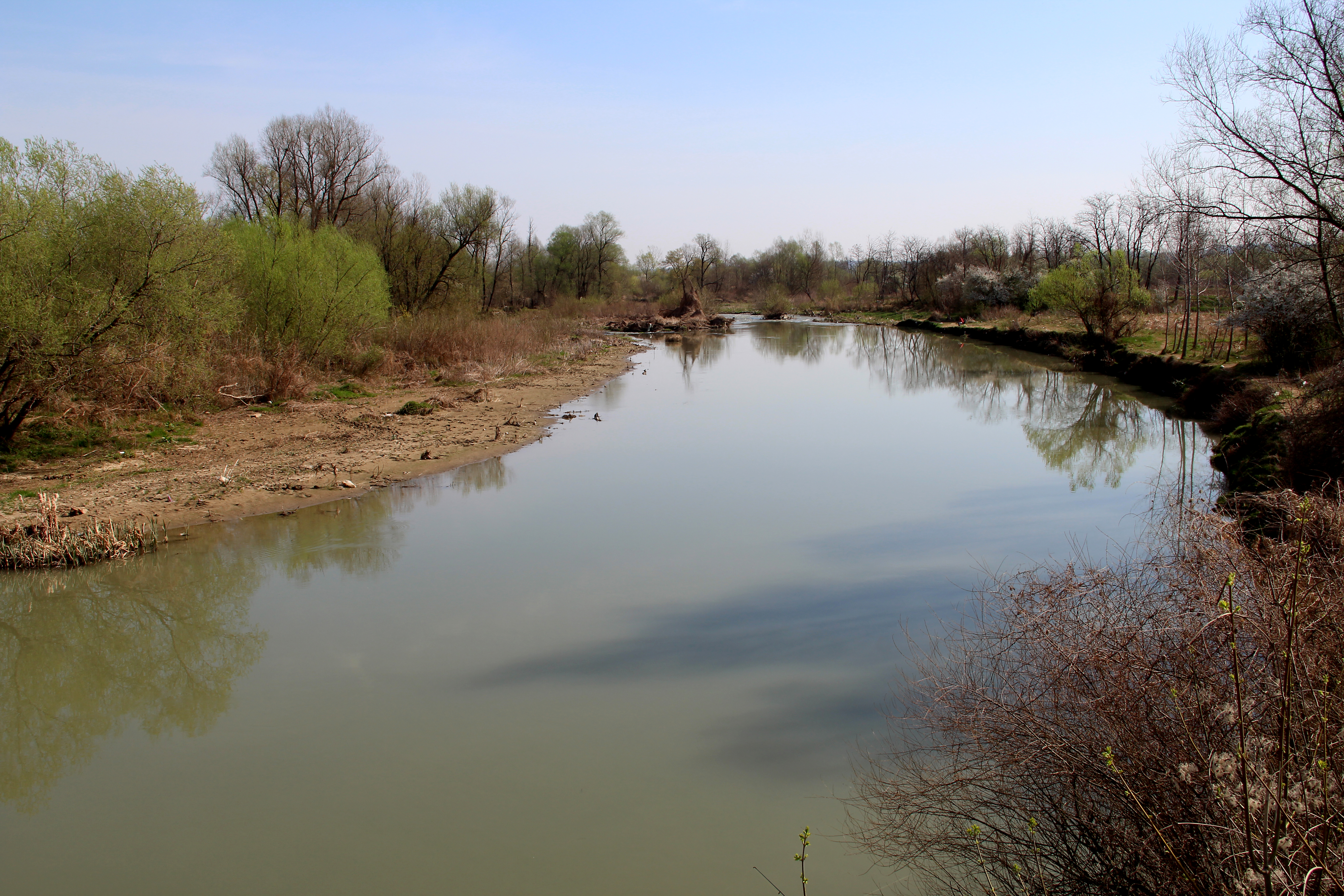
Village Suseoka - river Kolubara

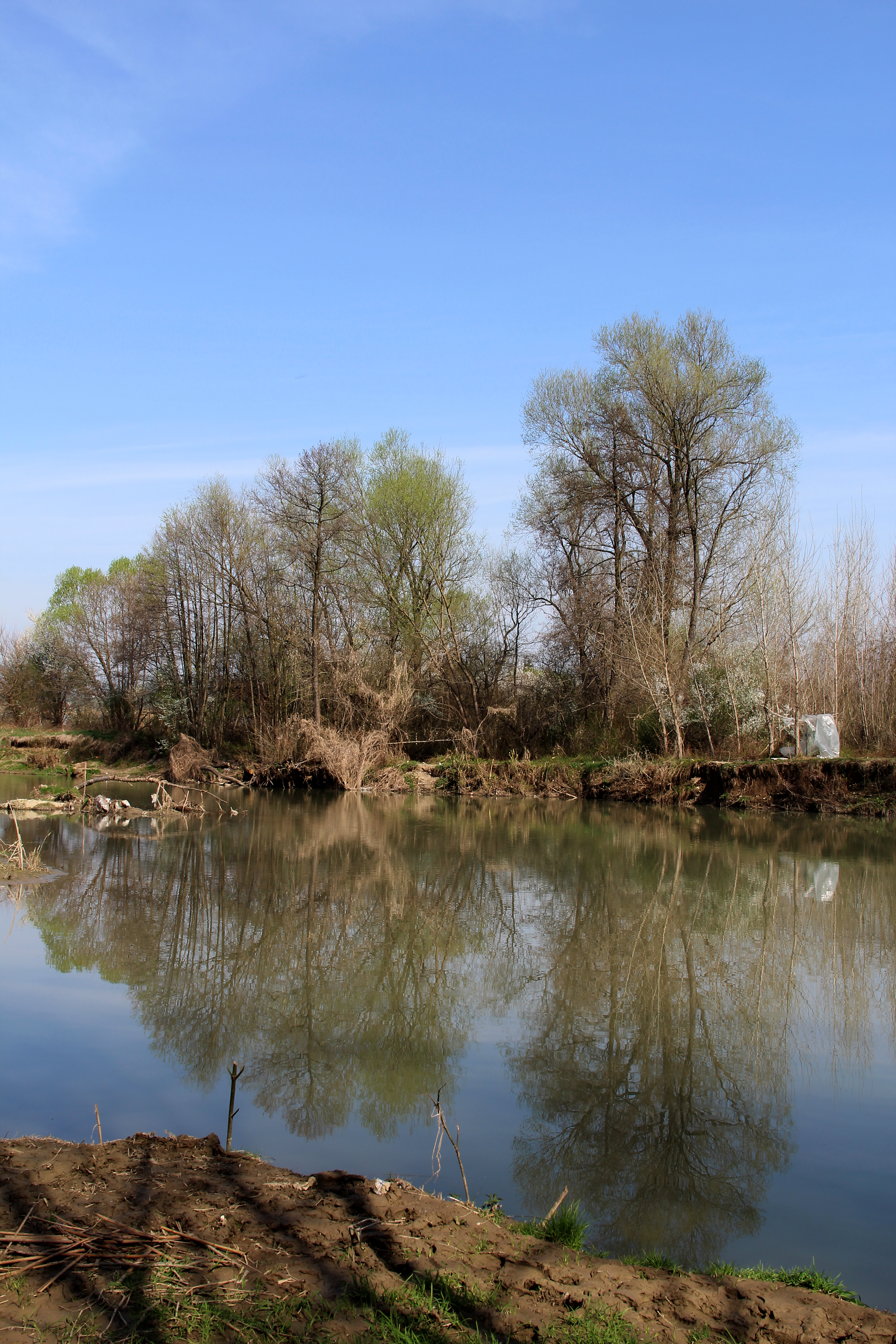
Village Suseoka - river Kolubara

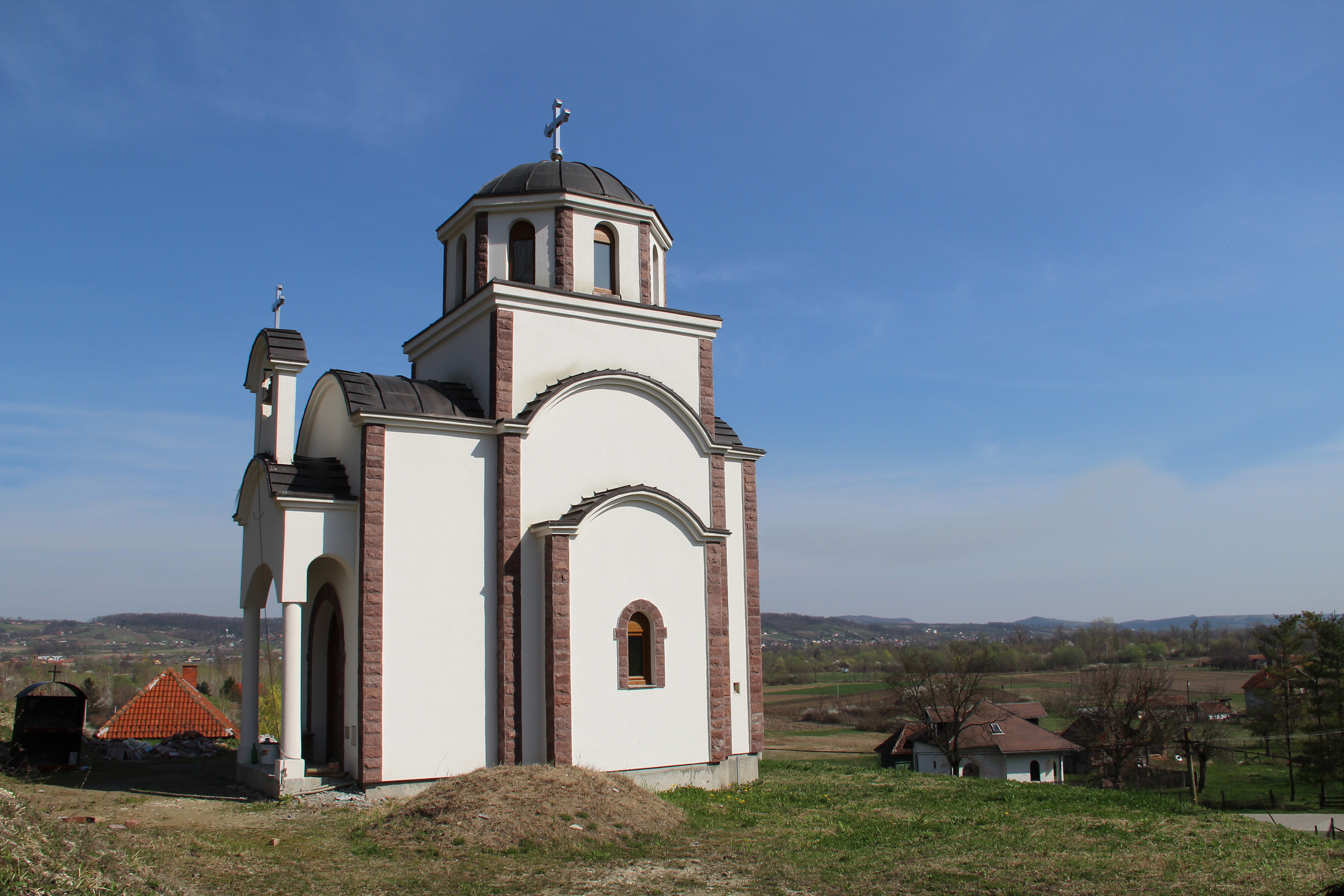
Village Suseoka - church St. George
