= Mionica =

Mionica Мионица (Serbian)
- Town and municipality
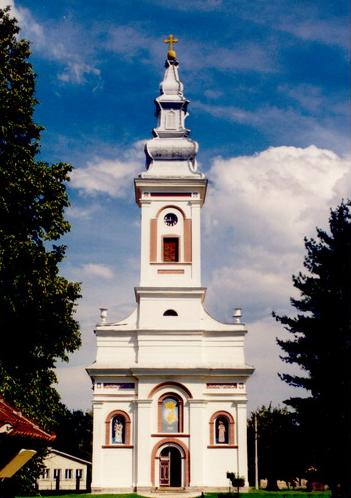
- Serbian Orthodox church

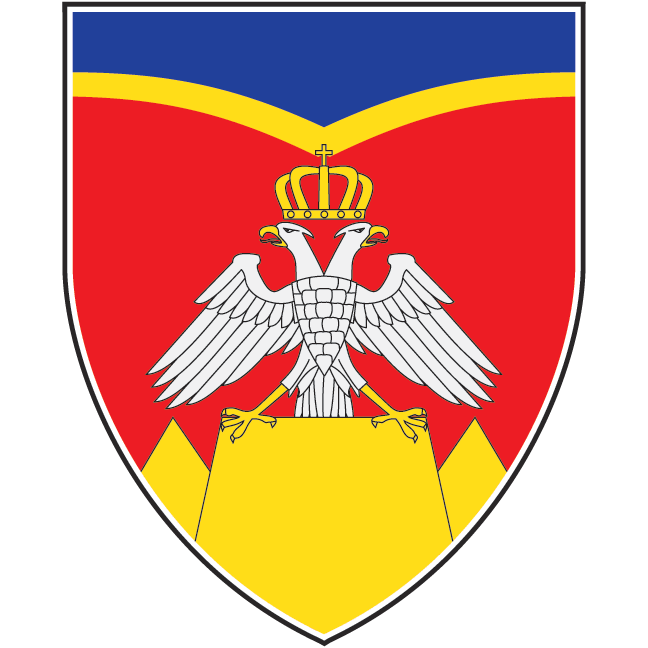
- Coat of arms

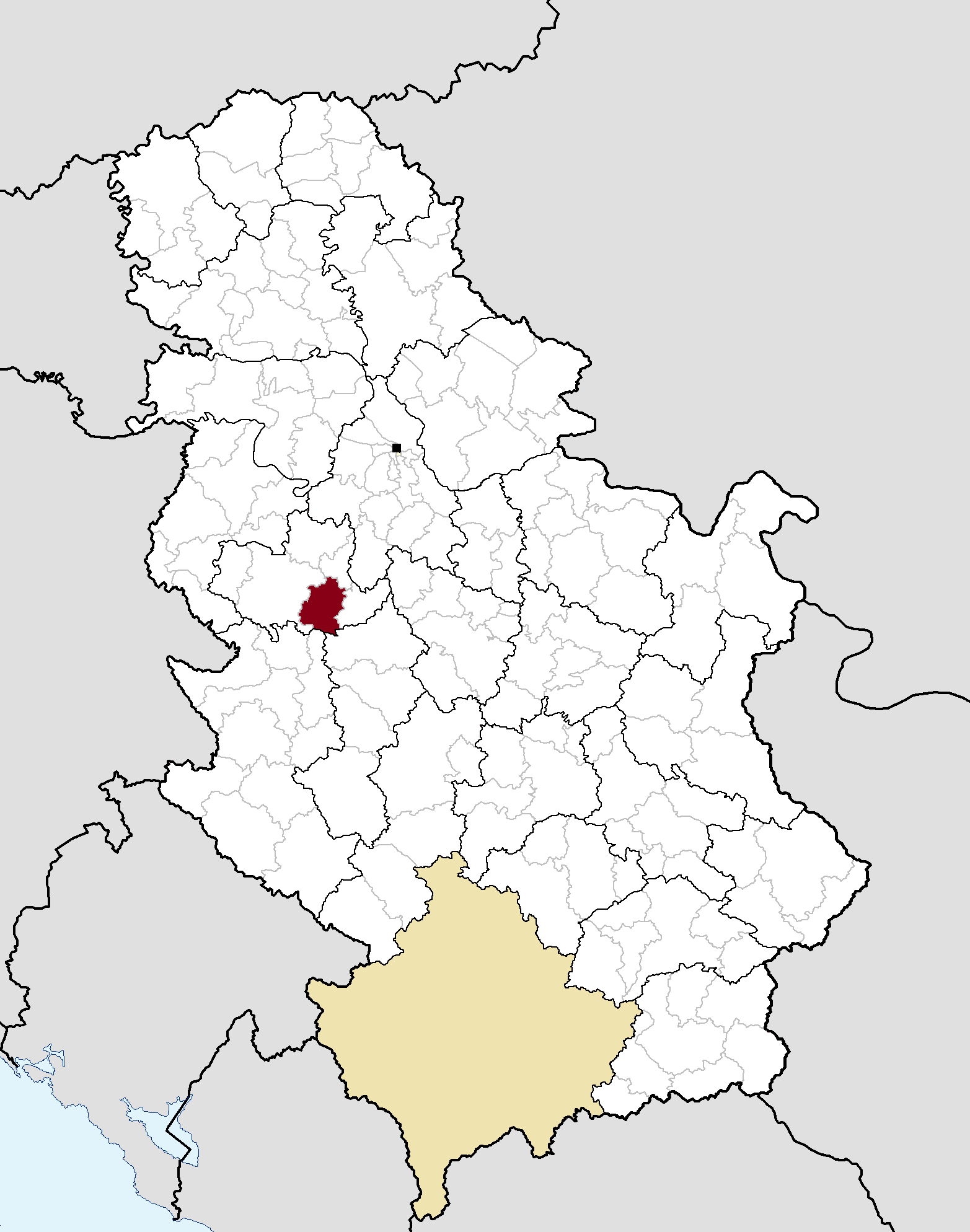
- Location of the municipality of Mionica within Serbia
- Coordinates: 44°15′N 20°05′E
- Country: Serbia
- Region: Šumadija and Western Serbia
- District: Kolubara
- Settlements: 36

Government
  - Mayor: Boban Janković (SNS)

Area
  - Town: 1.38 km^{2} (0.53 sq mi)
  - Municipality: 329 km^{2} (127 sq mi)
- Elevation: 189 m (620 ft)

Population (2022 census)
  - Town: 1,590
  - Town density: 1,150/km^{2} (2,980/sq mi)
  - Municipality: 12,061
  - Municipality density: 36.7/km^{2} (94.9/sq mi)
- Time zone: UTC+1 (CET)
  - Summer (DST): UTC+2 (CEST)
- Postal code: 14242
- Area code: +381(0)14
- Car plates: VA
- Website: www.mionica.rs

Mionica (Serbian Cyrillic: Мионица, pronounced [miɔ̌nit͡sa]) is a town and municipality located in the Kolubara District of western Serbia. As of 2022, the population of the town is 1,590, while population of the municipality is 12,061 inhabitants.

== Geography ==
The township of Mionica is located 92 km (57 mi) from Belgrade, the capital of Serbia. With an area of 329 km^{2} (127 sq mi), it is bordering the Maljen and Suvobor mountains to the South and has access to the Kolubara river, Sava region and the Panonian plain to the North. While the Serbs make up for a large majority of the population, the Roma make up a significant minority, while there are smaller populations of ethnic Montenegrins, Croats, Hungarians, Macedonians, Slovenians, Germans and Albanians.

== Demographics ==
Historical population
Year	Pop.	±% p.a.
1948	23,366	—
1953	23,905	+0.46%
1961	22,359	−0.83%
1971	20,560	−0.84%
1981	19,297	−0.63%
1991	17,368	−1.05%
2002	16,513	−0.46%
2011	14,335	−1.56%
2022	12,061	−1.56%

According to the 2011 census results, the municipality of Mionica has 14,335 inhabitants.

=== Ethnic groups ===
The ethnic composition of the municipality:

Ethnic group	Population	%
Serbs	13,758	95.97%
Roma	351	2.45%
Montenegrins	14	0.10%
Muslims	11	0.08%
Macedonians	7	0.05%
Yugoslavs	6	0.04%
Croats	6	0.04%
Others	182	1.27%
Total	14,335	

== Economy ==
Mionica's economy is predominantly agricultural. Its primary activities are the fruit orchards and raising cattle. The municipality is also a tourist destination, especially the Ribnica river, well known for sight-seeing and outdoor sports, such as fishing and hunting. The Vrujci spa also attracts tourists and is known for its bottled water.

The following table gives a preview of total number of employed people per their core activity (as of 2017):

Activity	Total
Agriculture, forestry and fishing	61
Mining	10
Processing industry	705
Distribution of power, gas and water	14
Distribution of water and water waste management	87
Construction	114
Wholesale and retail, repair	216
Traffic, storage and communication	126
Hotels and restaurants	117
Media and telecommunications	25
Finance and insurance	22
Property stock and charter	-
Professional, scientific, innovative and technical activities	86
Administrative and other services	22
Administration and social assurance	208
Education	187
Healthcare and social work	129
Art, leisure and recreation	29
Other services	38
Total	2,198

== Education ==
In Mionica there is one primary school, and Economy high school, a community health clinic and a culture center with a movie theater attached to it.

== Gallery ==
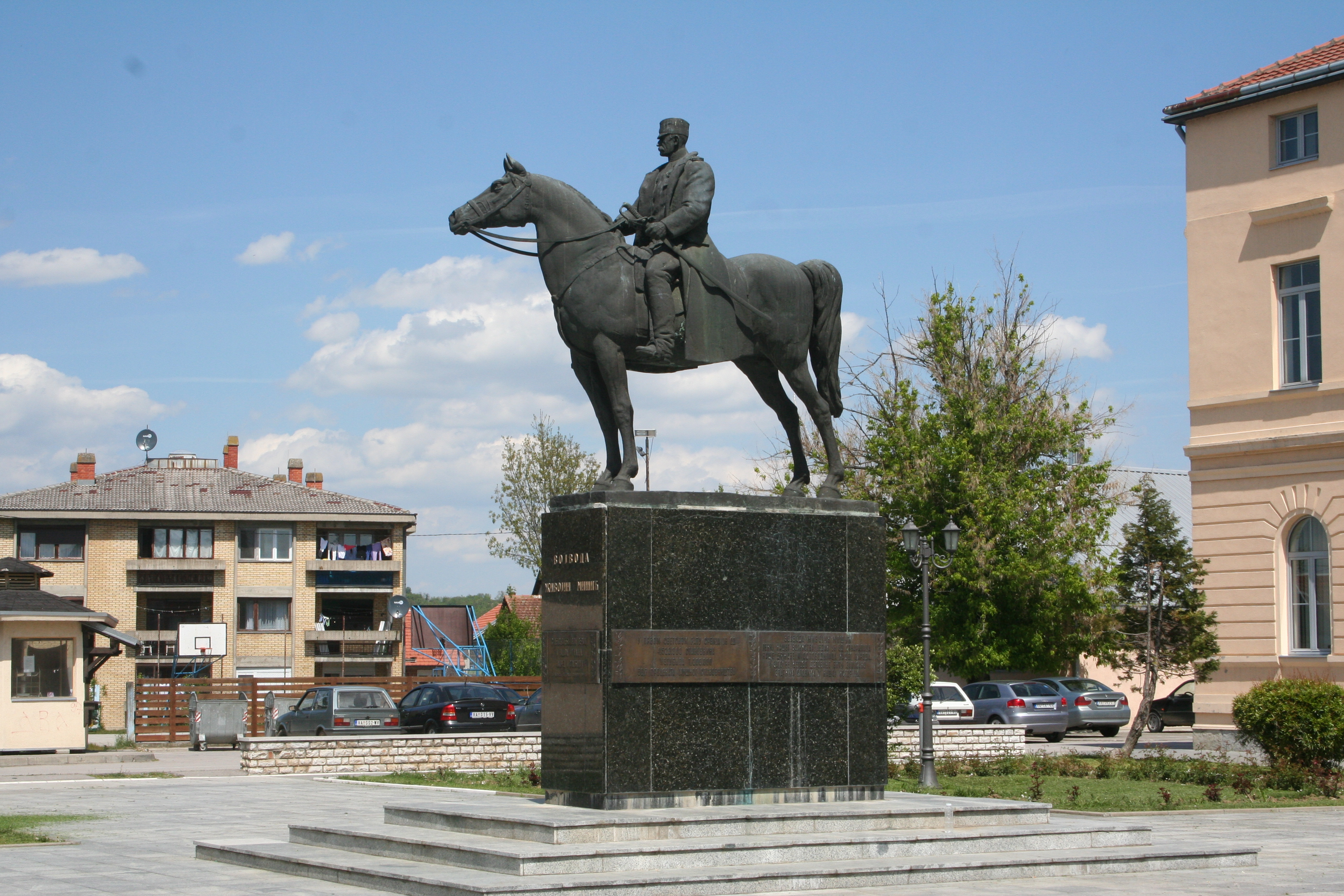
Monument to Živojin Mišić

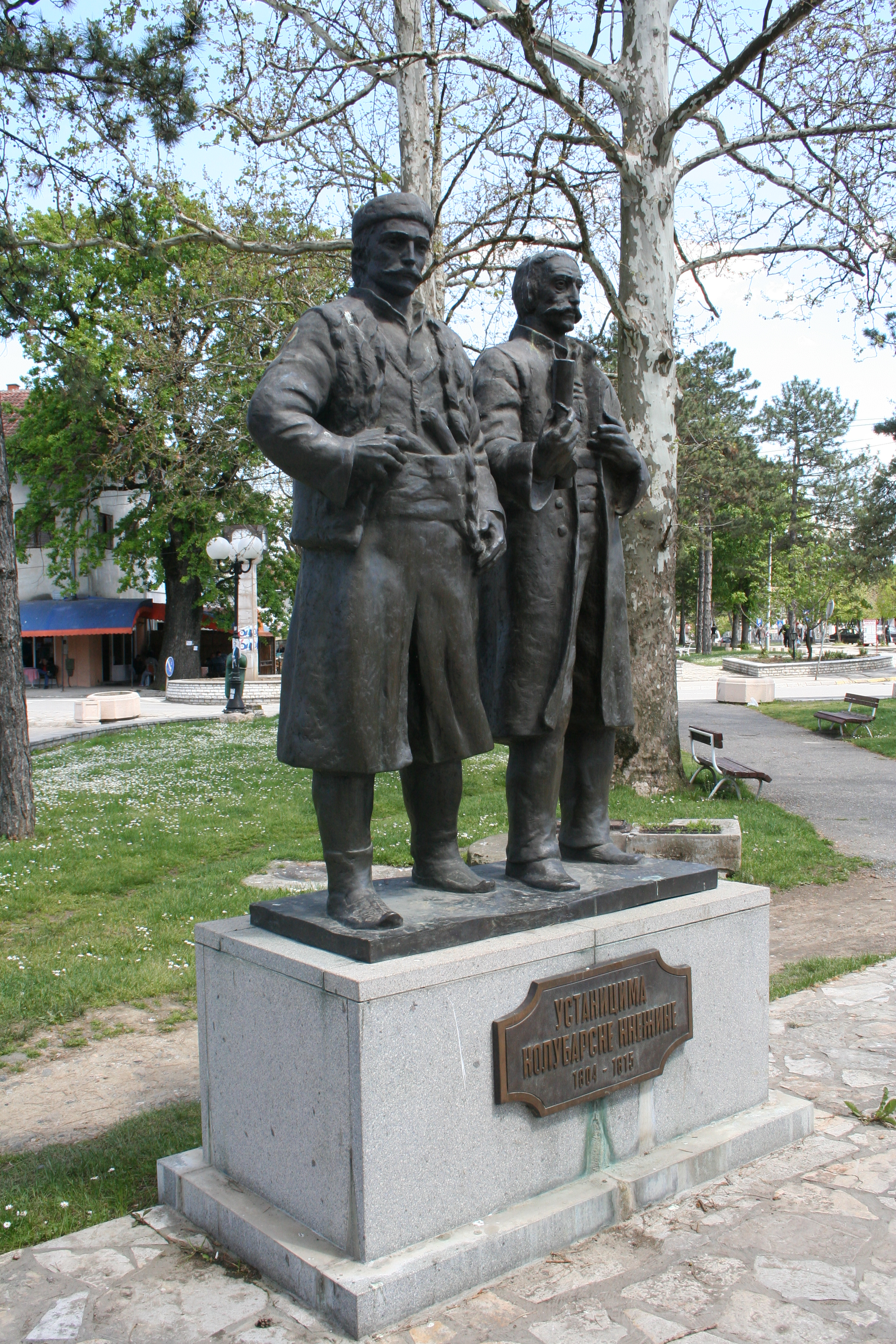
Monuments in town center

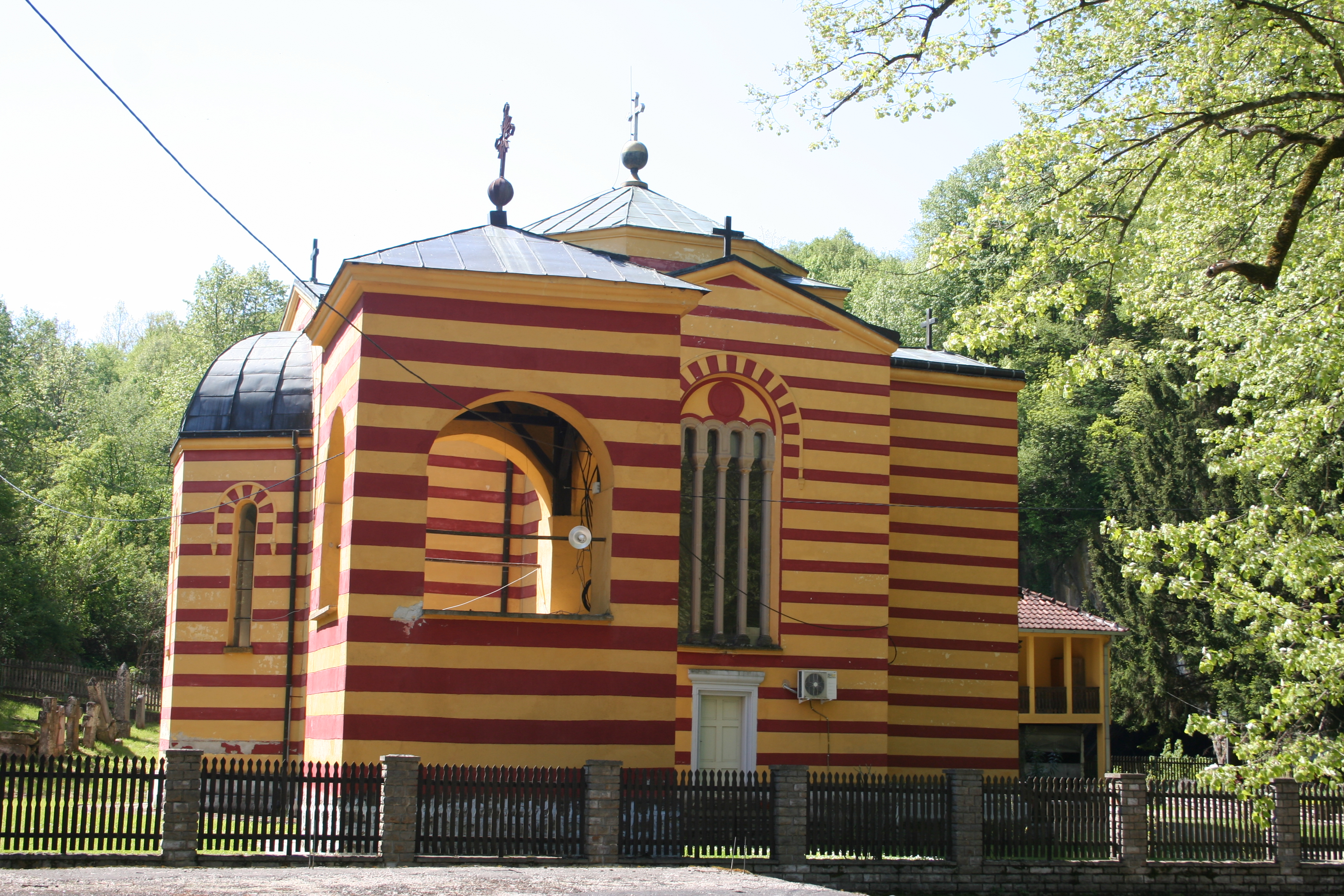
Monastery Ribnica

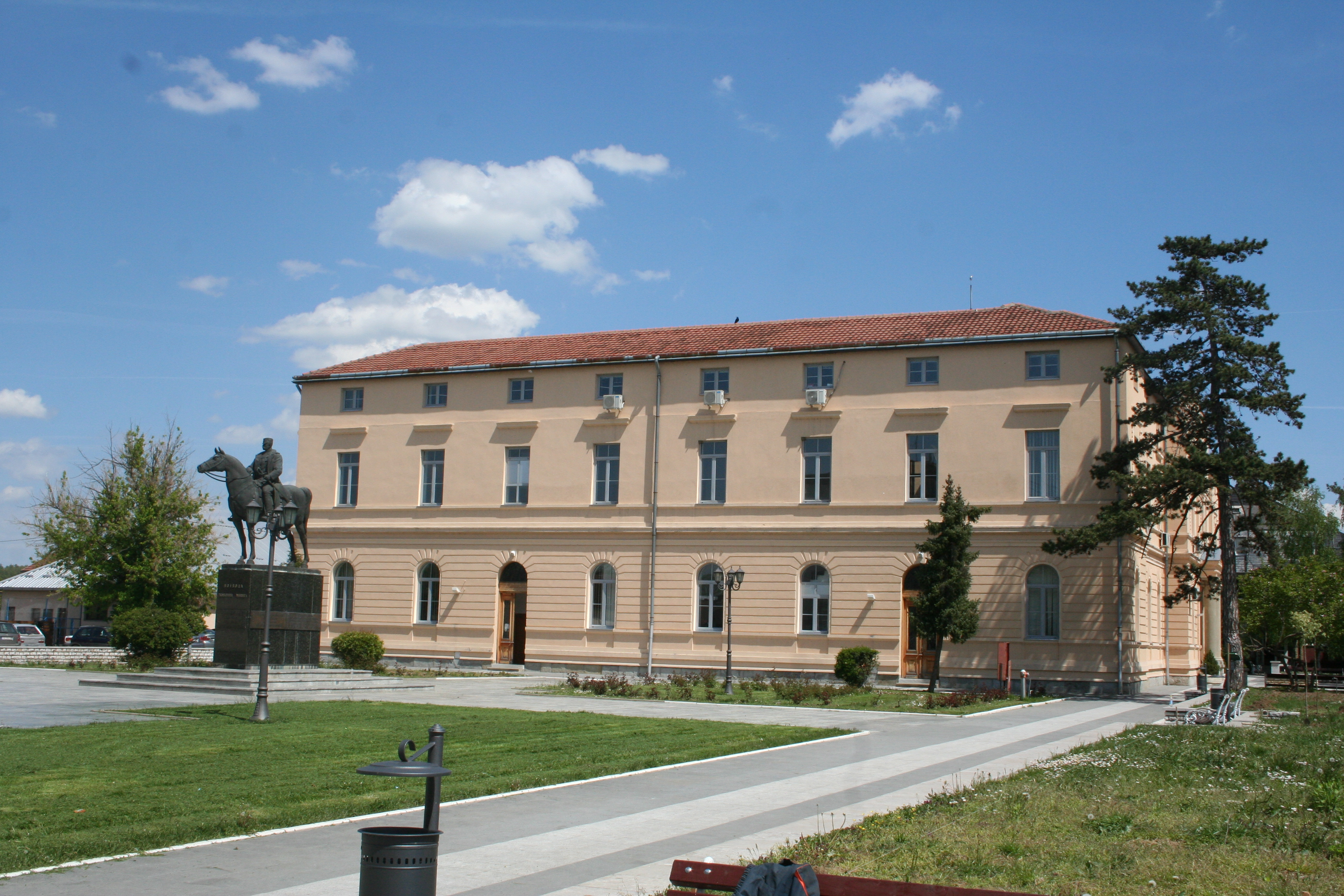
Mionica Town Hall

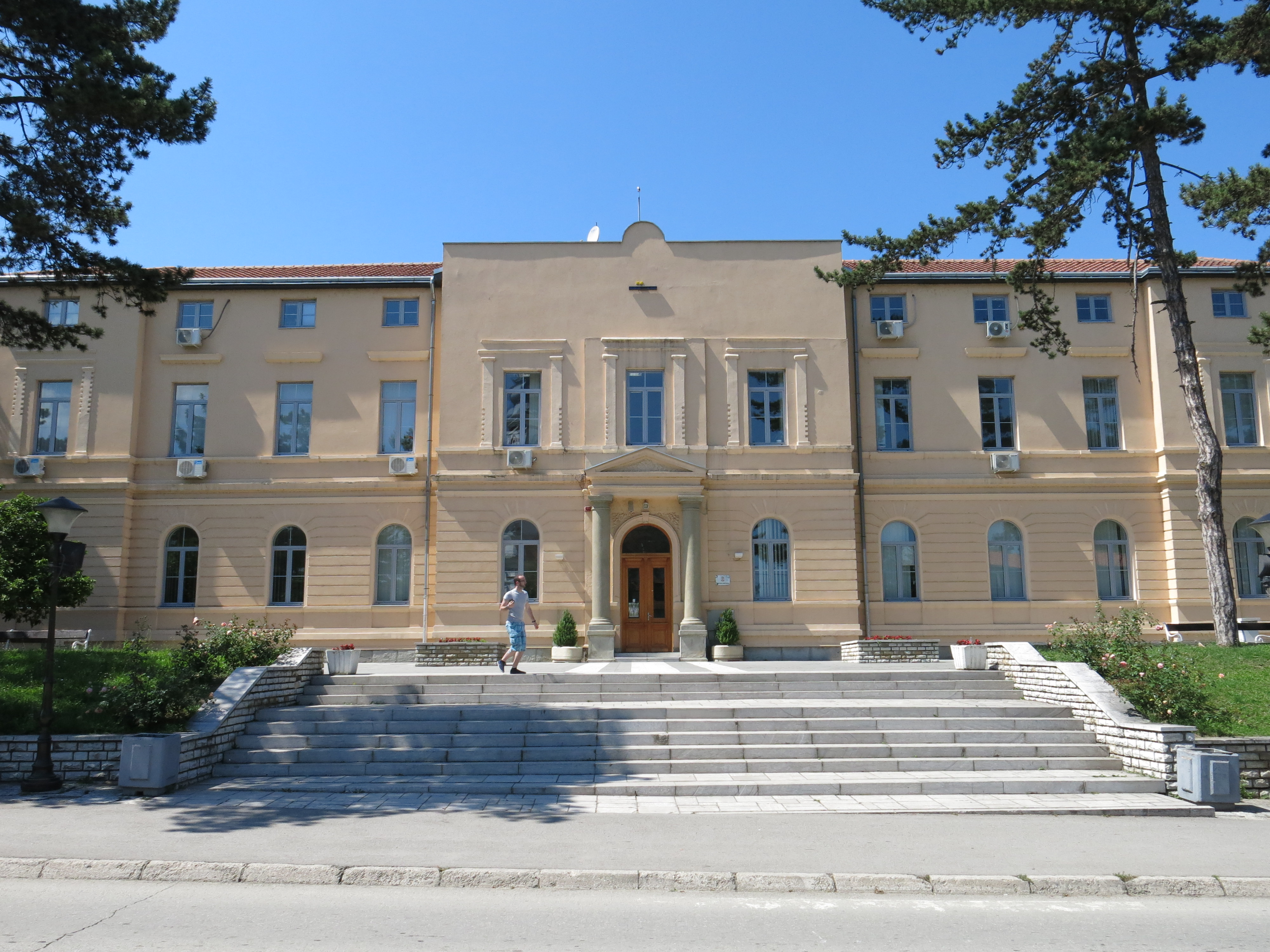
Mionica Town Hall

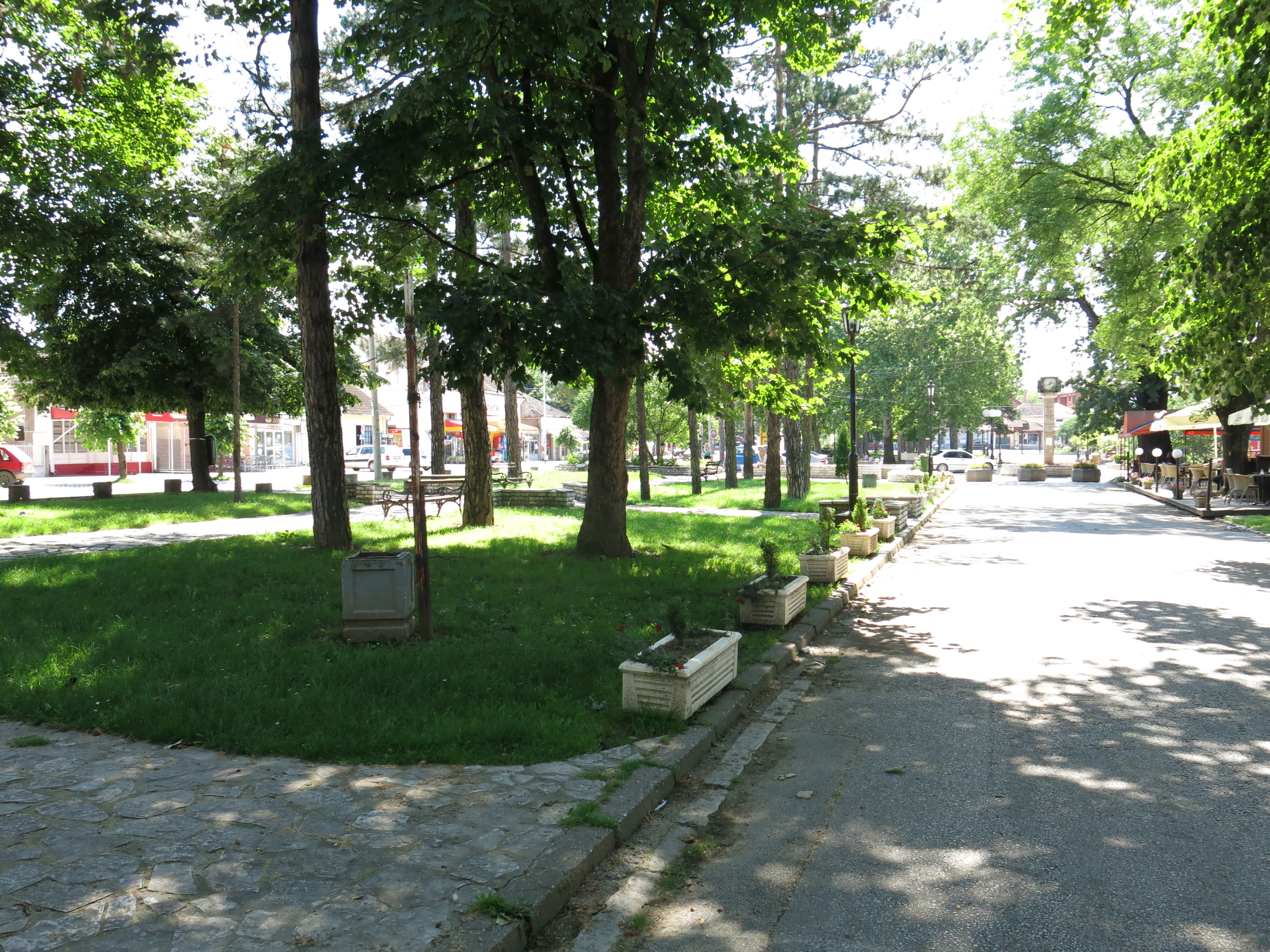
Mionica town park

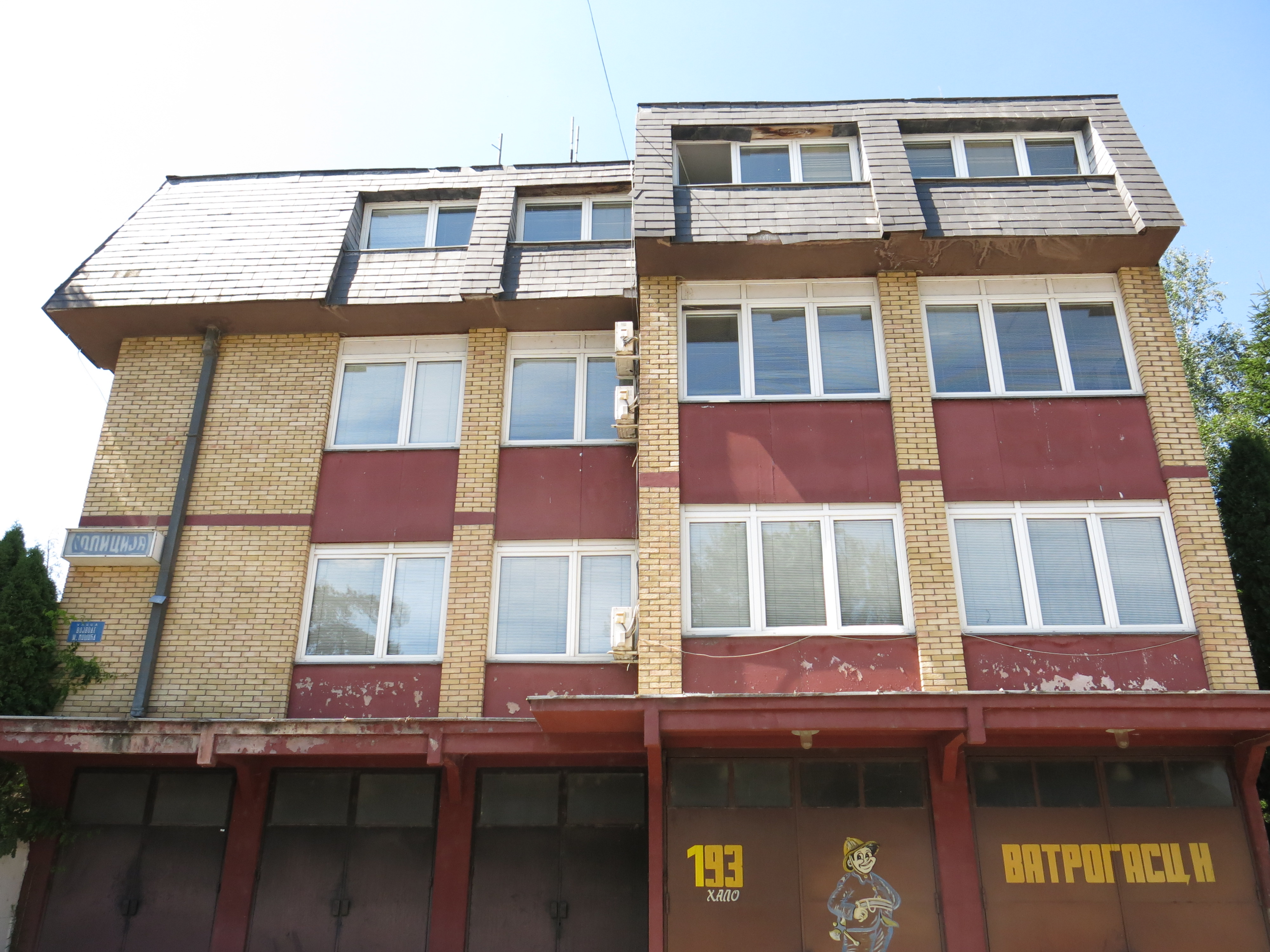
Mionica Police and Fire Station

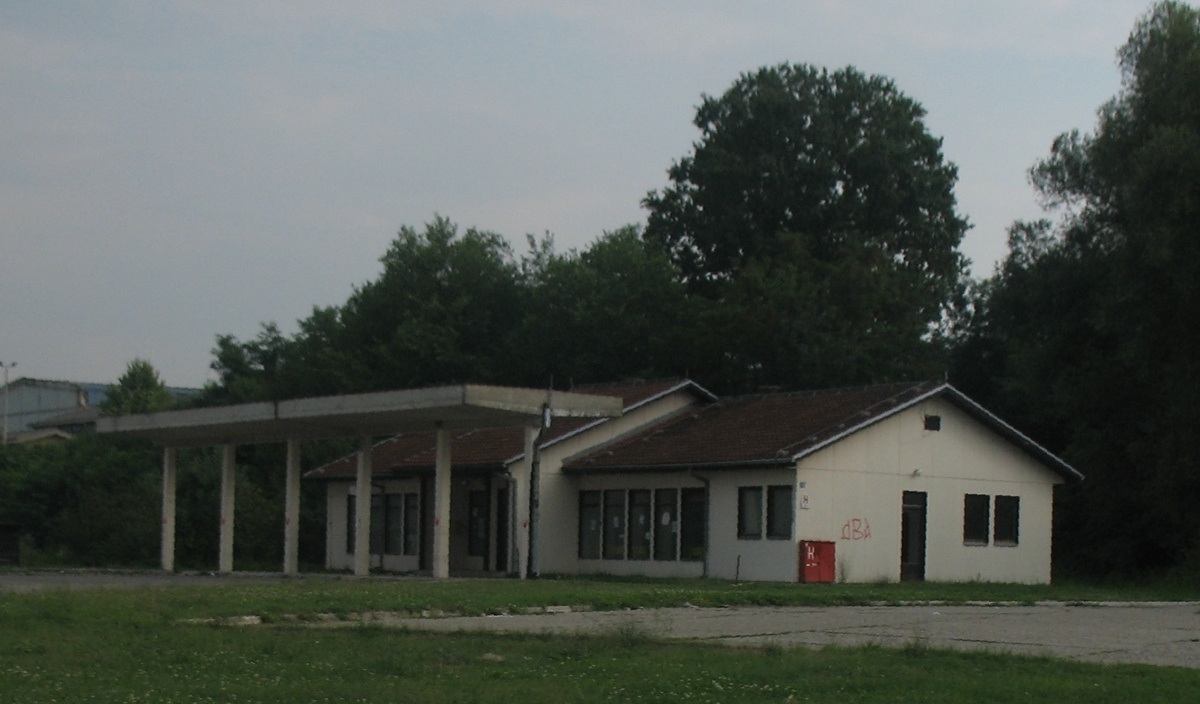
Mionica Bus Station

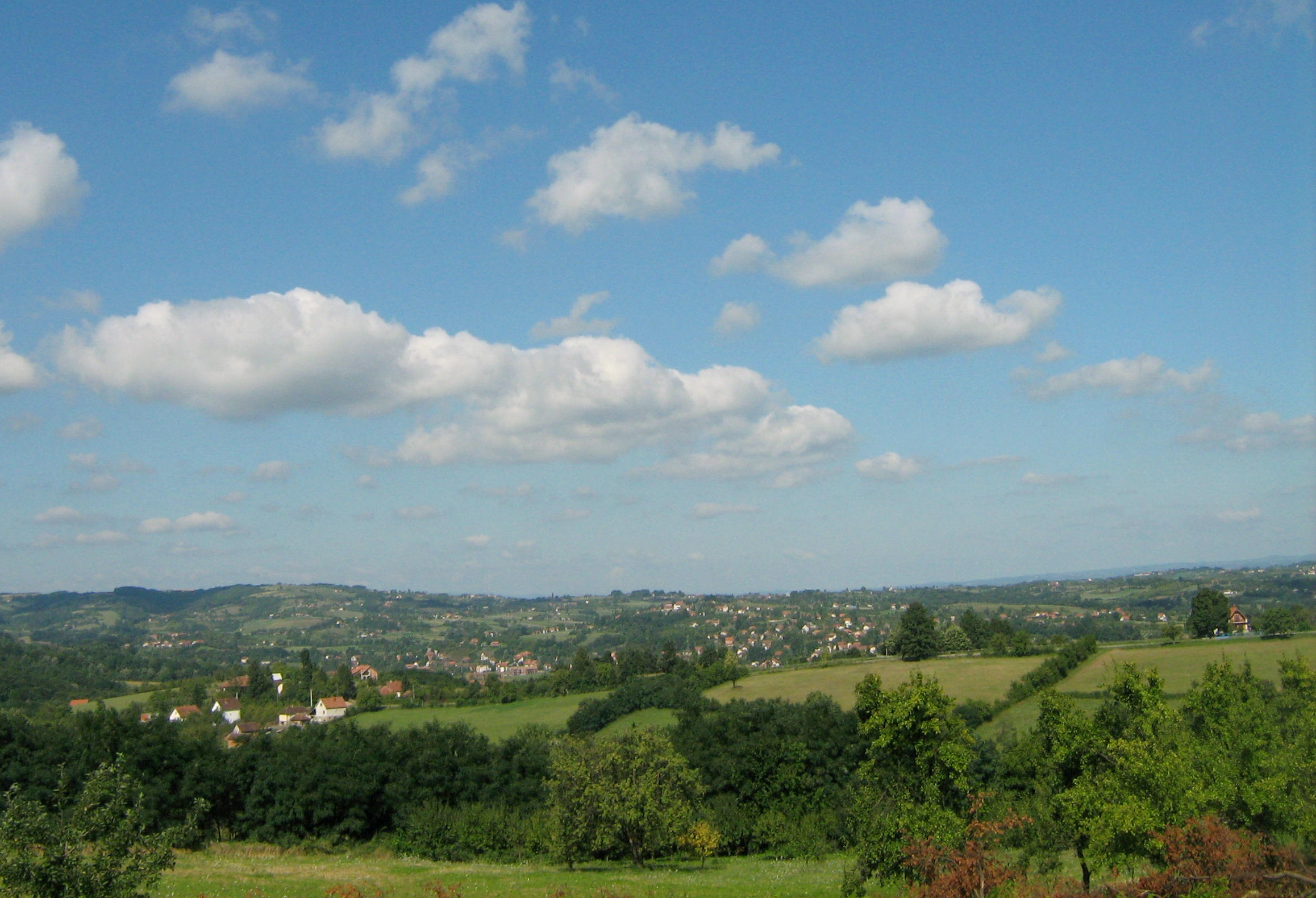
Spa town Vrujci panorama

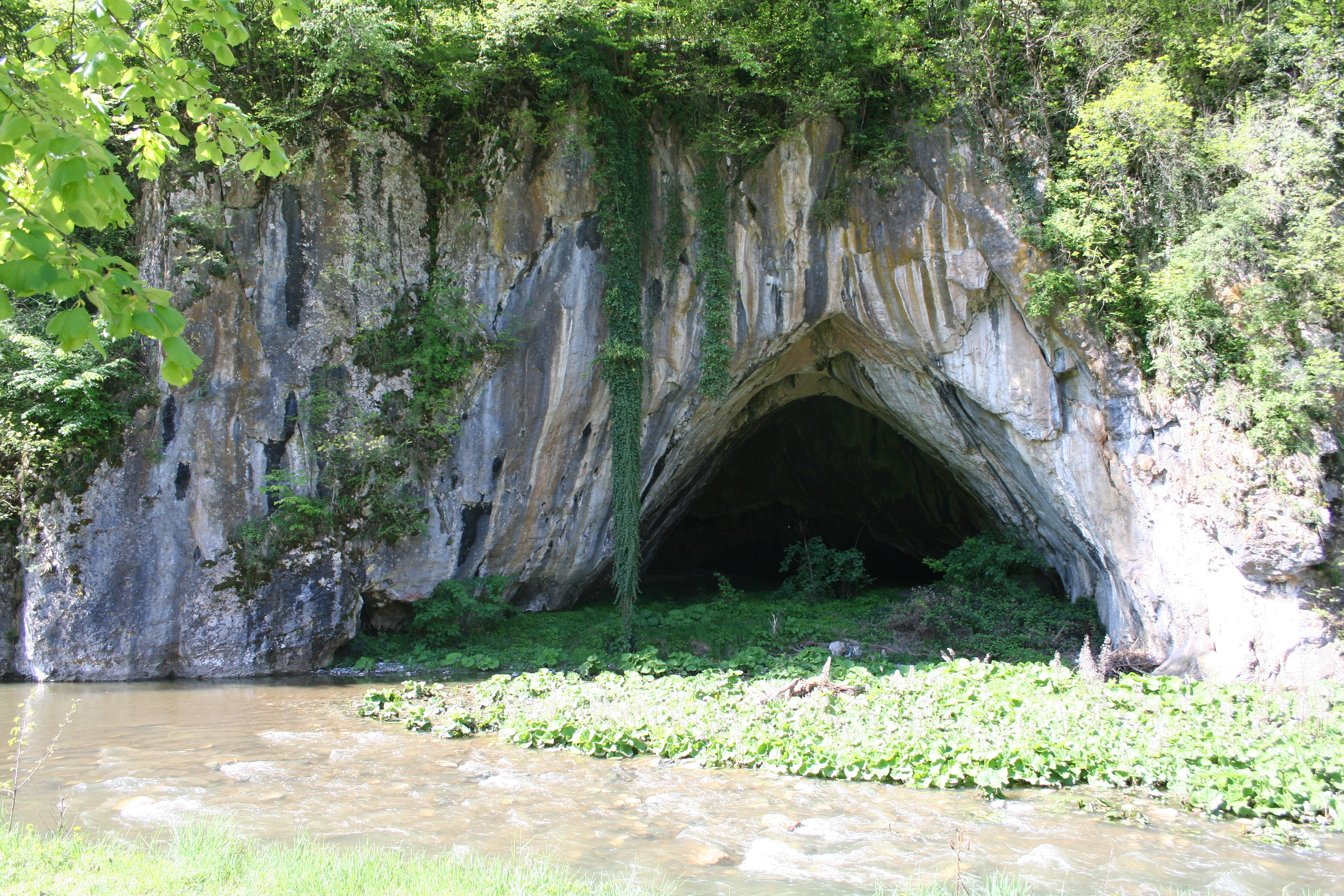
Great Ribnica Cave

== Twin cities ==
Country	City	Region	Date
Poland	Tomaszów Mazowiecki	Łódź Voivodeship	
Slovenia	Laško	Lower Styria	
Israeli settlement	Katzrin	Golan Heights	

== Notable people ==
- Nikola Grbović
- Boban Janković
- Miodrag Ješić
- Živojin Mišić

== See also ==
- Subdivisions of Serbia
