= Poljanice =

Poljanice may refer to:

- Poljanice, Travnik, a village in Bosnia and Herzegovina
- Poljanice (Višegrad), a village in Bosnia and Herzegovina
- Poljanice (Ljig), a village near Ljig, Serbia
- Poljanice, a hamlet in the municipality of Bečej, Serbia
- Poljanice, a section of Gornja Dubrava, Zagreb, Croatia
