= Štavica =

Štavica may refer to:

- Štavica, Prilep, North Macedonia
- Štavica (Ljig), Serbia
