= Štavica, Prilep =

Štavica Штавица
- Village
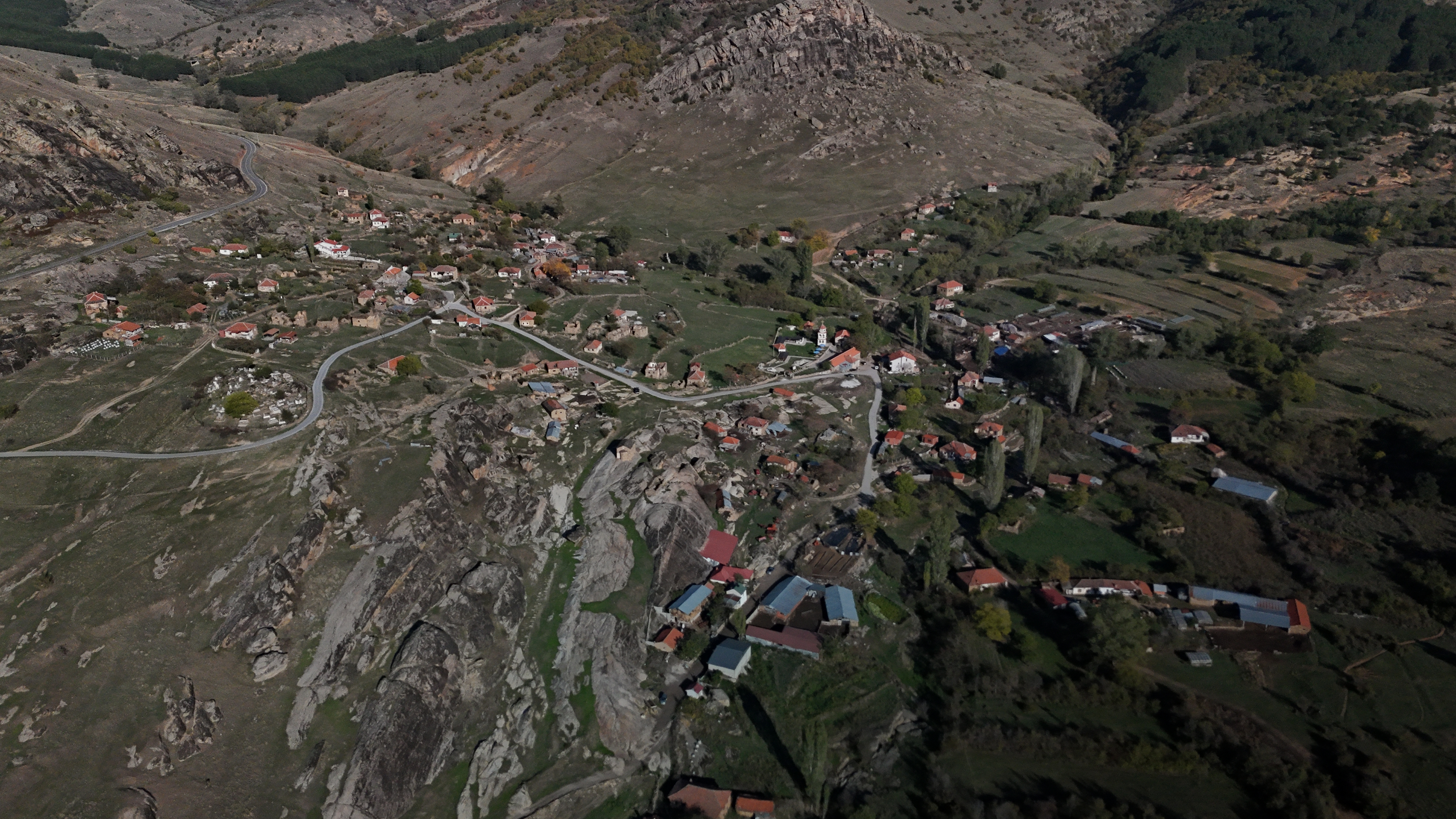
- Air view of the village

- Location within North Macedonia
- Country: North Macedonia
- Region: Pelagonia
- Municipality: Prilep
- Elevation: 990 m (3,250 ft)

Population (2002)
  - Total: 84
- Time zone: UTC+1 (CET)
- Postal code: 7515
- Area code: +38948

Shtavica (Macedonian: Штавица) is a village located in the Municipality of Prilep. It is located 13 km south of the town of Prilep.

== Geography and location ==
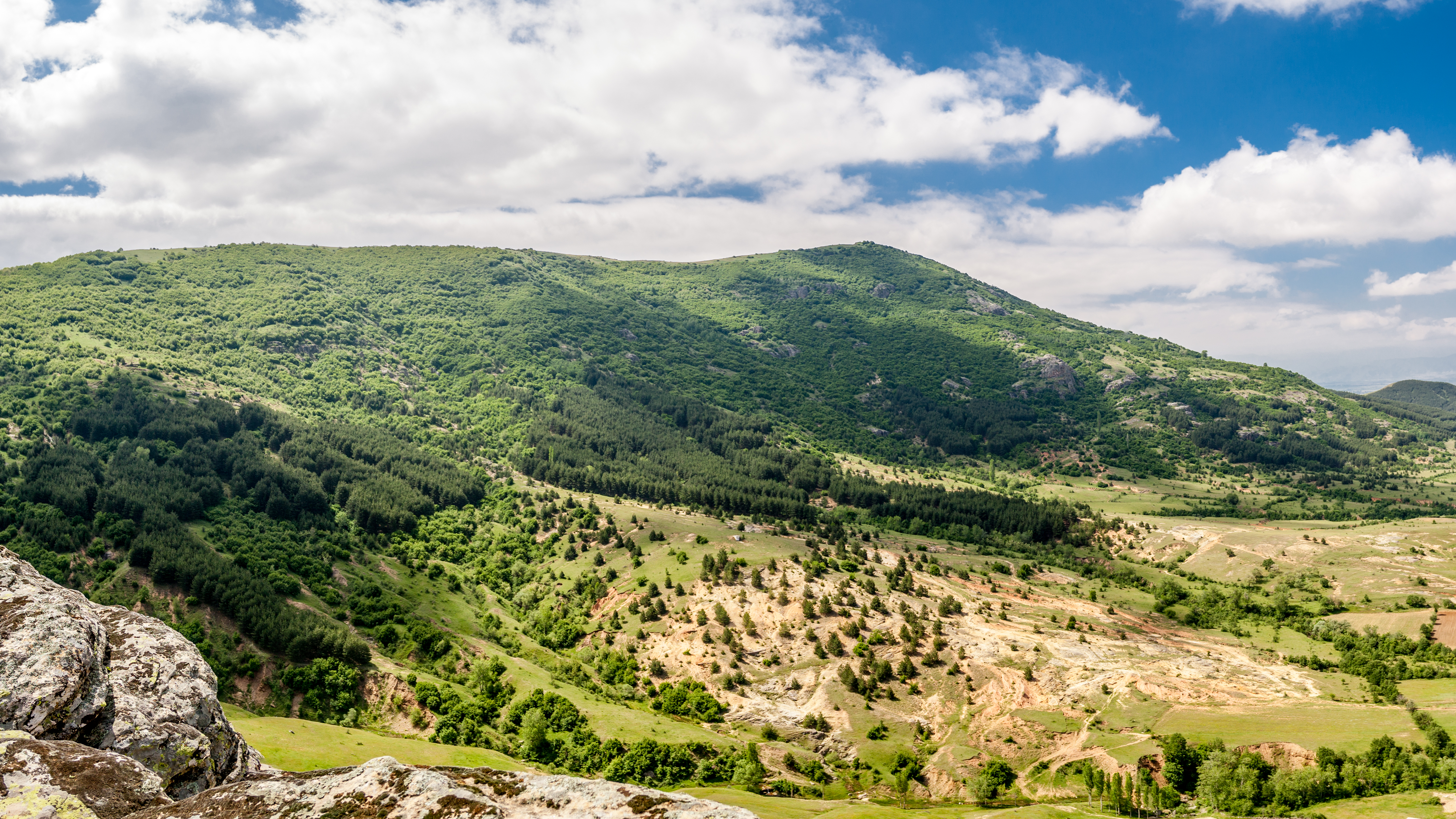
Landscape of the village

The village of Štavica is located on the southeastern side of the Prilep valley, in the wider Pelagonia valley. Close to the village, the road from Prilep to Mariovo passes through the pass Sliva.

Štavica is located on a hill, and is at an altitude of 800 meters, between the villages of Čumovo in the north, Marul in the south and Malo Ruvci in the west.

== History ==
The "For the Mountain Cemetery" locality lies south of the village about 500 meters away. Surface stone slabs can be seen on the surface of the earth. There is also a cross. Until 1946, the villagers walked with the crosses on Pentecost. Residents say it is a Christian tomb left from an older neighborhood, which "when the plague struck."

== Demographics ==
According to the 2002 census, the village had a total of 84 inhabitants. Ethnic groups in the village include:

- Macedonians 84

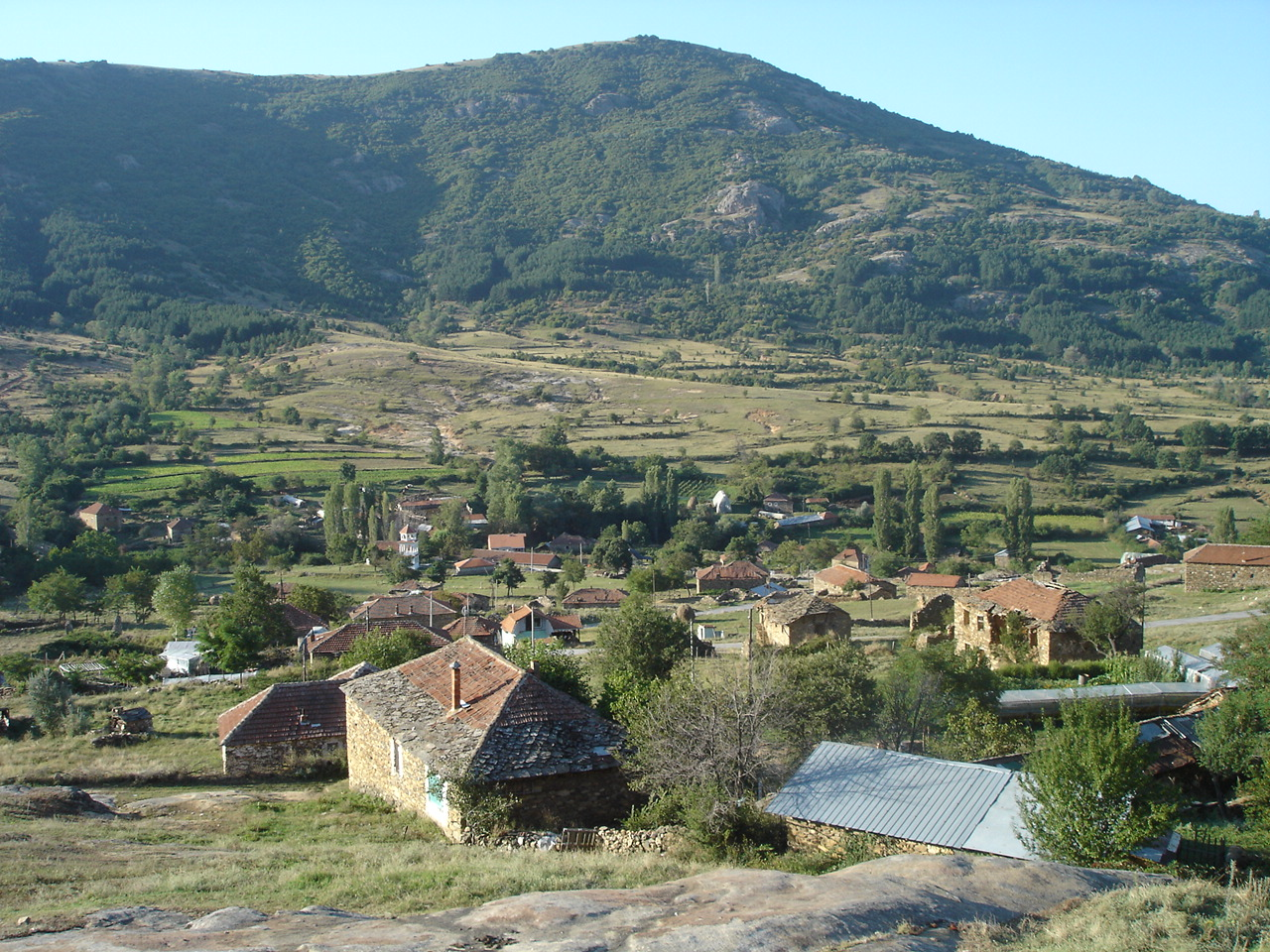
View of the village

A summary of the demographics (1900-2002):

Year	1900	1905	1948	1953	1961	1971	1981	1991	1994	2002
Population	322	360	444	493	494	413	264	127	107	84
