= Lilanje =

Petrovdanske lile at the Ethnographic Museum in Belgrade.

Lilanje (Serbian Cyrillic: лилање) is a ritual tradition which involves the young burning a dry birch or cherry cortex placed on the wooden stick (named lila, olalija, oratnik or oratnica) the night before a feast day (slava), practiced predominantly among the Eastern Orthodox Serbs. The tradition on St. Peter's feast day (Petrovdan, thus it is also known as petrovdansko lilanje) in West Serbia is connected traditionally to the shepherd communities around Šabac, Valjevo, Loznica, Ivanjica, Sjenica and Nova Varoš, and in northeastern Bosnia in Semberija, while it is also present among Serbian Orthodox in other regions, on the night before the feast days of Bele Poklade, St John's Eve (Ivanjdan), Feast of the Ascension (Spasovdan) and George's Day in Spring (Đurđevdan). It is also present among Roman Catholic Croats on St. Elijah's Day in three villages near Tuzla in northeastern Bosnia, and on John's Eve in Sopje in northeastern Croatia.

The ritual is of pre-Christian pagan origin, and is made to protect the household and community, to drive out demons with fire. It has been integrated into the local churches as a memorial ritual to the Christian martyrs. Similar customs exist in other parts of Europe. In the Roman Empire, there was the custom of Parilia.

The custom was registered as a Cultural Heritage of Serbia in 2017.

== See also ==
- Badnjak, Serbian Christmas tradition

== Sources ==
- Група аутора, Српски митолошки речник, НОЛИТ, Београд, 1970.г.
- Шпиро Кулишић, Петар Ж. Петровић, Никола Пантелић, Српски митолошки речник, Београд: Етнографски институт САНУ − Интерпринт, 1998
- Шћекић Марковић, Марија. 2017. Крстови од времена. Лозница: ЦЗК „Вук Караџић“.
- Етнографски Институт. Данило Трбојевић (ed.). "Лилање (лила)" [Lilanje (lila)]. Етнографски Институт.
- "Паљење петровданских лила, лилање". Нематеријално културно наслеђе Србије. Центар за нематеријално културно наслеђе Србије.
