= Western Serbia (region) =

Geographical macro region in Serbia

Western Serbia (Serbian: западна Србија / zapadna Srbija) refers to the western part of Serbia, encompassing roughly 6,500 square kilometres between the Sava river in the north, the Kolubara, Ljig and Dičina in the east, West Morava Valley and Zlatibor in the south, and Drina in the west. The region is divided into microregions such as Mačva, Posavina, Podrinje, Pocerina, Podgorina, Jadar, Rađevina, Tamnava, and Azbukovica. Another interpretation includes the southwestern part of Serbia, including the Raška macroregion.

== History ==
Neolithic remnants were found in Tekeriš. The region has a history of urban settlements in the Roman, medieval and Ottoman periods. The Roman settlement of Gensis existed in the area of Loznica, on the route from Sirmium to ad Drinum. The western part of Serbia was known in the 14th century during the reign of King Stefan Dragutin as Syrmia, however, from that time on, it was no longer known as such. In the mid-15th century Krupanj and Zajača were known as Serbian Despotate mines. The 1941 uprising was centred primarily in western Serbia.

== Geography ==
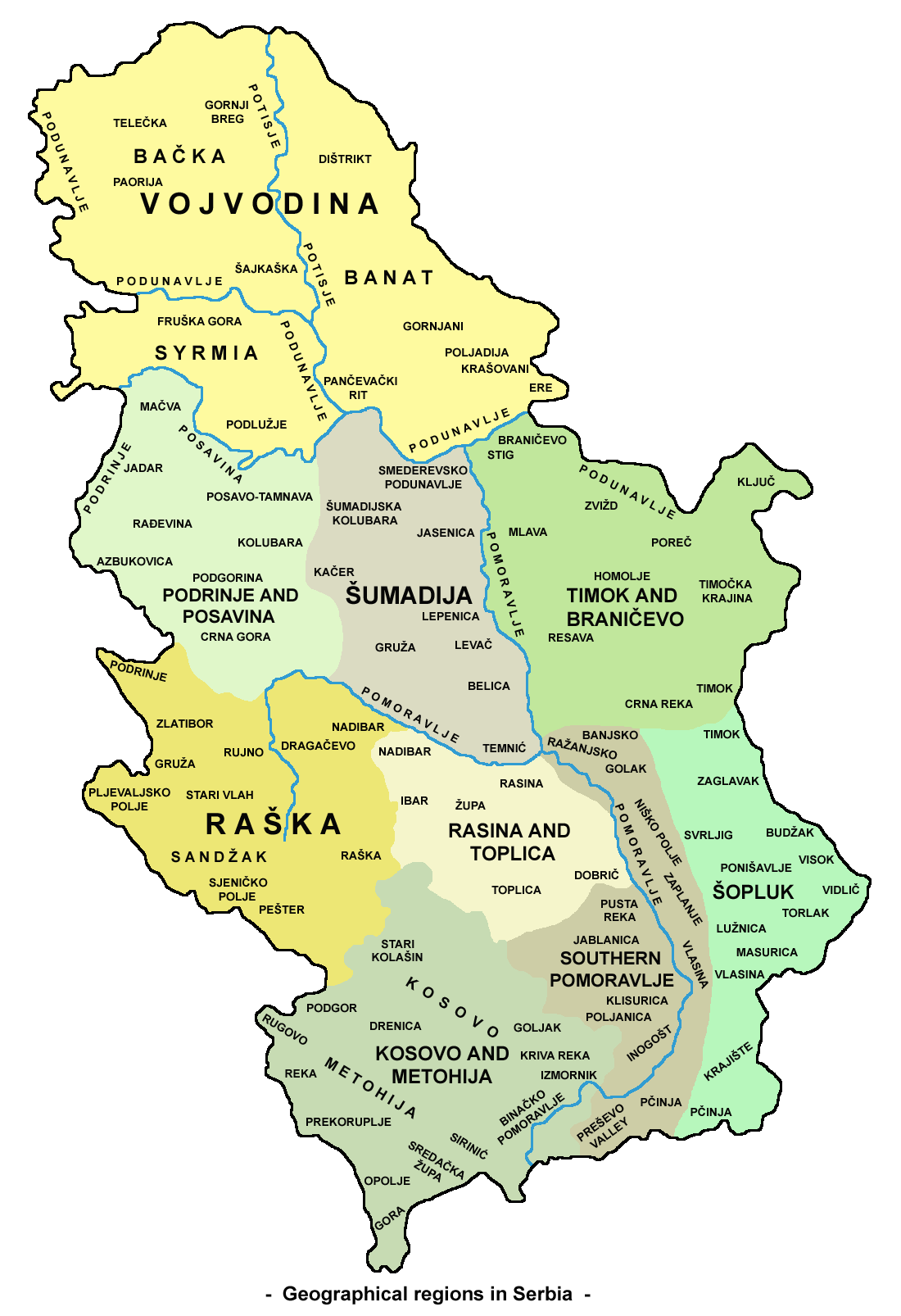
One regional classification of Serbia identifies Western Serbia as "Podrinje and Posavina"

Western Serbia stretches from Sava in the north, the Drina confluence to the Zvijezda mountain and from there along the border with Bosnia and Herzegovina in the west. The Uvac Valley is the beginning of the southern border, going to the Dobroselica village, from where it includes the catchments between the Drina tributaries of Lim and Uvac and basin of West Morava in the east, with mountain ridges of Murtenica, Javor and Radočel. The Studenica river is the southern border, including Ušće village, where the Studenica flows into the Ibar river, and from there becomes the eastern border downstream into the West Morava near Kraljevo. From Kraljevo, the Western Morava is the border river until the Dičina river enters, forming the eastern border to Rajac in the north. Across Rajac, the eastern border follows down the Ljig river into the Kolubara river and from there up to the Sava river.

The relief is dominated by low and medium mountains: Gučevo, Boranja, Jagodnja, Sokolske planine, Jablanik, Medvednik, Povlen, Maljen and Suvobor with Rajac. In Valjevska Podgorina, around Lelić and Bačevac, karst relief appears in the form of holes, coves and caves. The Petnička Cave near Valjevo is famous.

The rivers in the region include Drina, Kolubara, Gradac, Jadar and other smaller rivers. There are hot springs in limestone terrains. Zvornik Lake is a lake created by damming the Drina, and the water is used to produce electricity in the Zvornik hydroelectric plant. The most famous thermal mineral springs are located in Banja Koviljača.

== Demographics ==
There are two cities Valjevo and Šabac, while towns include Loznica, Mali Zvornik, Krupanj, Koceljeva, Bogatić and Ljubovija. Valjevo, with 56,145 inhabitants is the largest urban settlement and an important cultural, educational and industrial center of the region, with a developed food and chemical industry, as well as defense industry. Šabac with 51,163 inhabitants is the center of the chemical, pharmaceutical and food industry. Most of the rural settlements are of the scattered type, except in Mačva.

== See also ==
- List of regions of Serbia

== Sources ==
- Milojević, Miroslav (1975). Западна Србија: аграрно-географска проучавање [West Serbia]. Српска академија наука и уметности, Географски Институт "Јован Цвијић".
- Mitrović, Dojčilo (1975). Srbija u Narodnooslobodilačkoj borbi: Zapadna Srbija 1941 [West Serbia]. Nolit.
- Savić, Olga (1978). "Западна Србија" [West Serbia]. Зборник радова. 32. Географски институт "Јован Цвијић".
