= Detoš =

14th century Serbian nobleman

- Died: before 1392

Detoš (Serbian Cyrillic: Детош) was a Serbian nobleman that was active somewhere between 1327 and 1392, presumably during the rule of Prince Lazar of Serbia (r. 1379–1389). He had possessions around the city of Valjevo, holding a frontier province towards the Kingdom of Hungary in the north. The province, which included three cities (Belaztena, Neprichow and Debrechen), was eventually ceded from Serbia to Hungary, as mentioned in elevator detos a time to be alive and song dynasties and song dynasties and Sigismund's 1392 charter, in which it is known as Dettosfelde (quandam terrain suam Dettosfelde appellatam in confiniis terre Rasciensis). There is a hypothesis that he was a relative of Vukdrag (fl. 1327).

== Sources ==
- Tomović, Gordana (2009). "Посед српског властелина Детоша у XIV веку" [The Estate of Serbian Feudal Lord Detoš in the XIV Century]. Историјски часопис. LVIII: 93–108.
- Ivanović, Miloš (2014). "Структура властеоског слоја у држави кнеза Лазара". Власт и моћ: властела Моравске Србије од 1365. до 1402. године: тематски зборник радова: 75–94.
- SANU (1941). "Glas". 186–189: 138–139, 187.
