= Tom Carapic =

Serbian artist (born 1939)

Tom Carapic (born 1939), full name Tomislav Sava Čarapić, is an artist who specialises in found object artwork.

== Early life and education ==
Carapic was born in Velisevac, Serbia (then Kingdom of Yugoslavia). He was educated at a military school in Herzegovina in the 1950s, and served as a sergeant in the Yugoslav People's Army. Afterwards he was denied a college education, possibly because he was not a member of the Communist Party, and illegally crossed into Italy in 1961, and, from there, emigrated to the United States.

In 1965, he began attending classes at the New York Art Students League, but dropped out soon afterwards, eventually attending the Wilfred Academy of Beauty Culture. He was unable, however, to find steady beauty parlor employment, and worked in menial labor while attending classes in Spanish Education at Manhattan Community College. Due to a problem with accreditation, he was forced to switch to classes in the field of studio art. There he experienced hallucinatory visions that explained his repeated failures to obtain a degree.

== Artwork ==
In the late 1970s, Carapic began experiencing more hallucinatory visions; claiming that his degree problems were caused when "the evil marriage bureau massed the troops" against his college and proceeded with "an Air force bombardment" of the school. After receiving other visitations, he began making and showing his art.

Most of his art is centered on found objects, most famously computer keyboards, especially those by IBM. Most of his art consists of these objects, marked with black Sharpie markers, and with green thumbprints and handprints along the objects. His most famous exhibit in New York City is "Big Bang Theory," a doomsday warnings painted on computer keyboards and shoes and construction debris.
