= Ljig =

Ljig Љиг (Serbian)
- Town and municipality
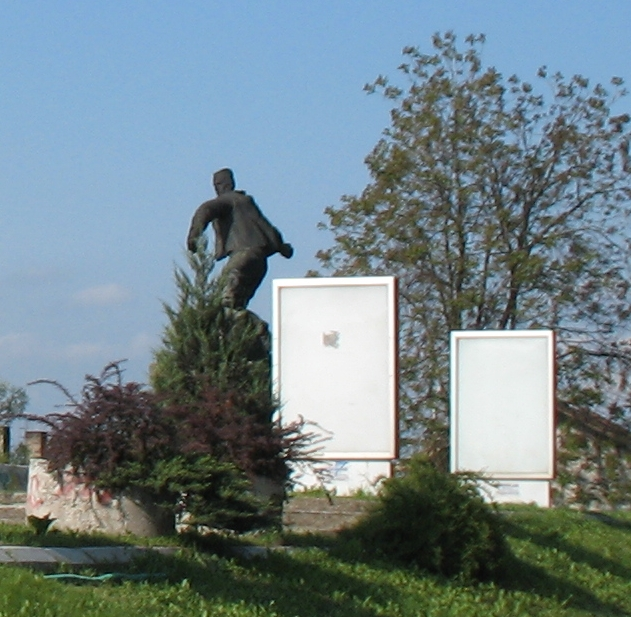
- Monument to the Partisans

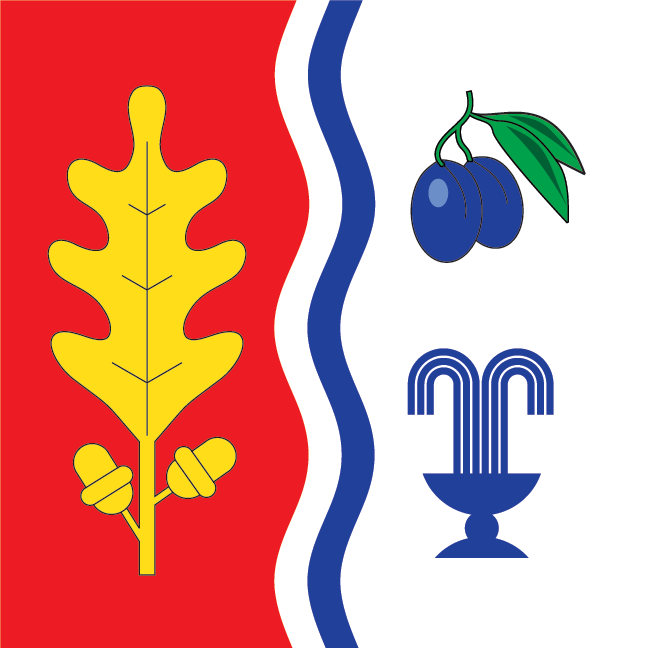
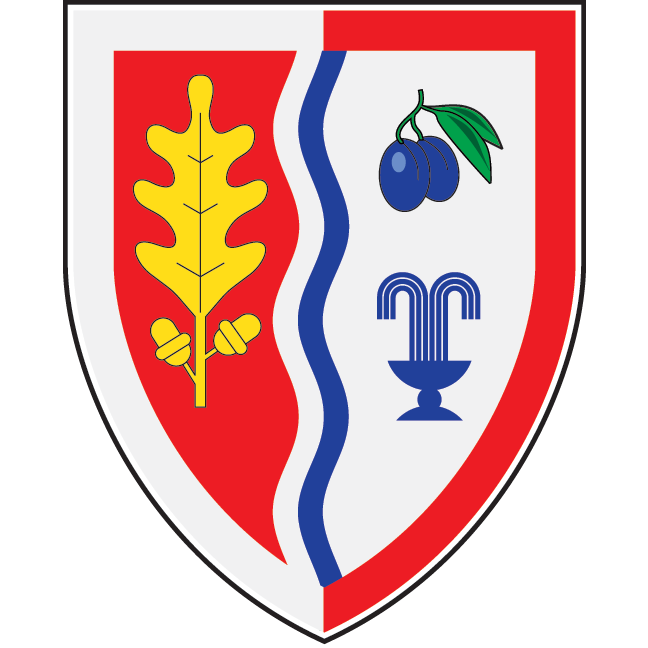
- Flag Coat of arms

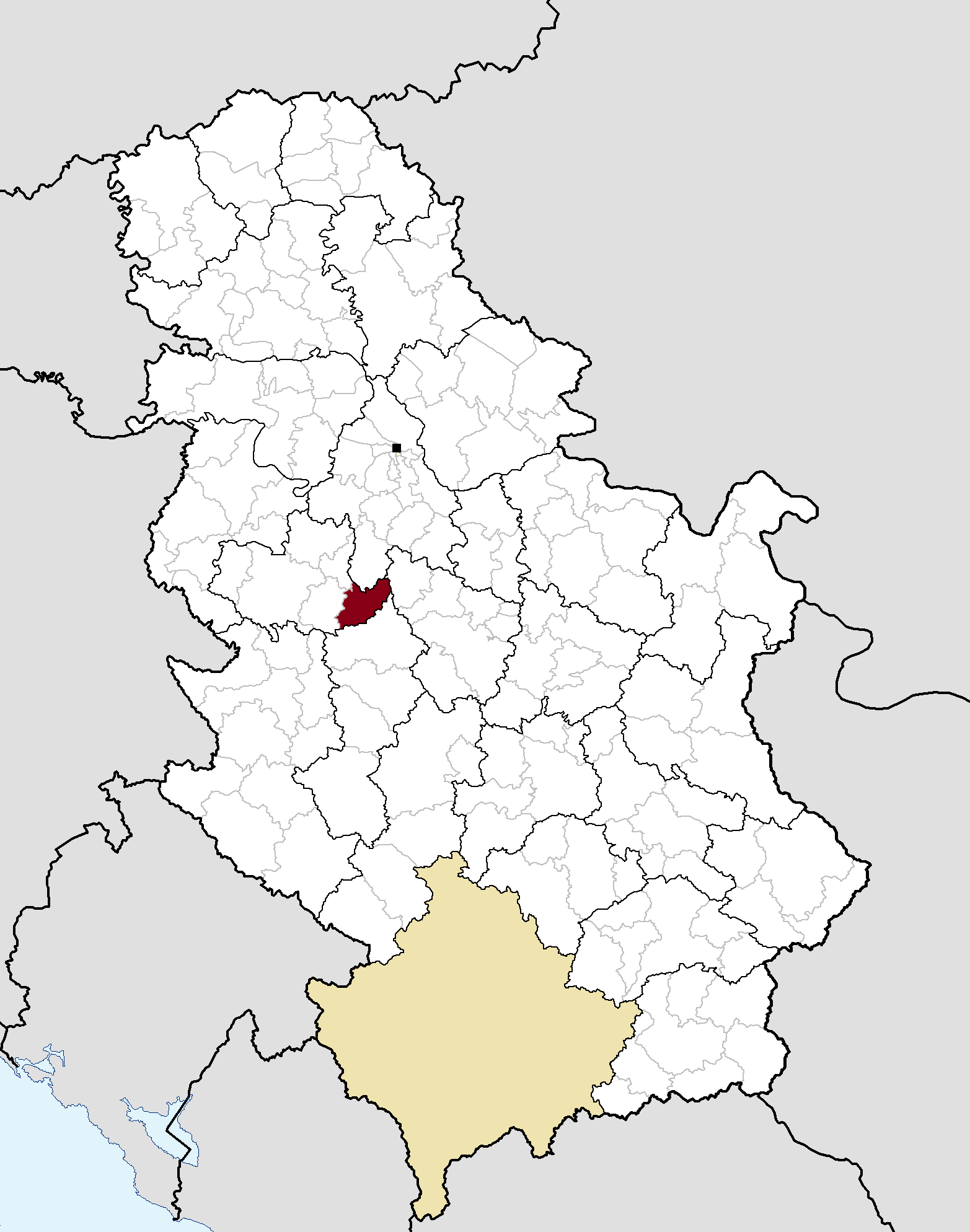
- Location of the municipality of Ljig within Serbia
- Coordinates: 44.23°N 20.24°E
- Country: Serbia
- Region: Šumadija and Western Serbia
- District: Kolubara
- Settlements: 27

Government
  - Mayor: Milomir Starčević (SNS)

Area
  - Town: 5.42 km^{2} (2.09 sq mi)
  - Municipality: 279 km^{2} (108 sq mi)
- Elevation: 150 m (490 ft)

Population (2022 census)
  - Town: 2,938
  - Town density: 542/km^{2} (1,400/sq mi)
  - Municipality: 10,711
  - Municipality density: 38.4/km^{2} (99.4/sq mi)
- Time zone: UTC+1 (CET)
  - Summer (DST): UTC+2 (CEST)
- Postal code: 14240
- Area code: +381(0)14
- Car plates: VA
- Website: www.ljig.rs

Ljig (Serbian Cyrillic: Љиг) is a town and municipality located in the Kolubara District of western Serbia. It has a population of 2,938 inhabitants, while the municipality has a total of 10,711 inhabitants.

It is surrounded by Mount Rajac and Mount Rudnik.

== History ==
The recorded history of the Ljig settlement itself begins in 1911, when a railroad was built between Lajkovac and Gornji Milanovac. The area, however, has a long history. The Dići church was founded by Serbian nobleman Vlgdrag, who was buried here in 1327. The ruins of the medieval Vavedenje Monastery include impressive sarcophagi dating from the 15th century, believed to belong to the Serbian despots Stefan Branković and Đurađ Branković. According to legend, Djuradj's wife, Jerina, was buried there as well.

An early reference to "Ljig" can be found in the 17th century records of Evliya Çelebi, which describe "LIGmehri" (the Ljig river) rising from Kara Dag in the village Baht (today's Ba) and flowing into the Kolubara river near Valjevo. No settlement in the area was known to the Austrians when they occupied Serbia from 1717 to 1739. By 1818, however, the nearby settlement Gukosi had grown to 50 homes.

A railway station was built in 1917 near the present-day center of Ljig. This lower area under the Gukoši hill includes a small settlement with a municipal court, school, inn, two stores, two textile mills, three tailors and several houses, and when still part of Gukoši had been referred to as the area "on the Ljig river."

During World War I, the Battle of Kolubara was fought nearby, making this area significant in history of Serbia and of war, and in military science. A monument memorializing the battle has been erected on Rajac mountain.

Ljig separated from Gukoši in 1922, and by 1930 a school, health center and church were built. Prior to that time, Ljig residents had worshipped in Moravci.

== Settlements ==
The town of Ljig is the economic and cultural center of the municipality with a primary school founded in 1907, a high school, a public library with a cinema, a health center and a post office.

Aside from the town of Ljig, the following settlements are part of municipality of Ljig:

- Ivanovci
- Kozelj
- Lalinci
- Veliševac
- Babajić
- Ba
- Kadina Luka
- Kalanjevci
- Jajčić
- Liplje
- Moravci
- Štavica
- Gukoš
- Milavac
- Brančić
- Poljanice
- Latković
- Slavkovica
- Paležnica
- Belanovica
- Bošnjanović
- Donji Banjani
- Dići
- Cvetanovac
- Živkovci
- Šutci

== Demographics ==
Historical population
Year	Pop.	±% p.a.
1948	20,190	—
1953	20,697	+0.50%
1961	19,662	−0.64%
1971	18,549	−0.58%
1981	17,620	−0.51%
1991	15,912	−1.01%
2002	14,629	−0.76%
2011	12,754	−1.51%
2022	10,711	−1.57%

According to the 2011 census results, the municipality of Ljig has 12,754 inhabitants.

=== Ethnic groups ===
The ethnic composition of the municipality:

Ethnic group	Population	%
Serbs	12,145	95.23%
Roma	160	1.25%
Montenegrins	17	0.13%
Yugoslavs	11	0.09%
Macedonians	8	0.06%
Croats	7	0.05%
Others	406	3.18%
Total	12,754	

== Economy ==
The following table gives a preview of total number of registered people employed in legal entities per their core activity (as of 2018):

Activity	Total
Agriculture, forestry and fishing	22
Mining and quarrying	159
Manufacturing	393
Electricity, gas, steam and air conditioning supply	4
Water supply; sewerage, waste management and remediation activities	48
Construction	95
Wholesale and retail trade, repair of motor vehicles and motorcycles	359
Transportation and storage	111
Accommodation and food services	115
Information and communication	28
Financial and insurance activities	16
Real estate activities	1
Professional, scientific and technical activities	55
Administrative and support service activities	12
Public administration and defense; compulsory social security	161
Education	235
Human health and social work activities	82
Arts, entertainment and recreation	21
Other service activities	50
Individual agricultural workers	271
Total	2,239

== Gallery ==
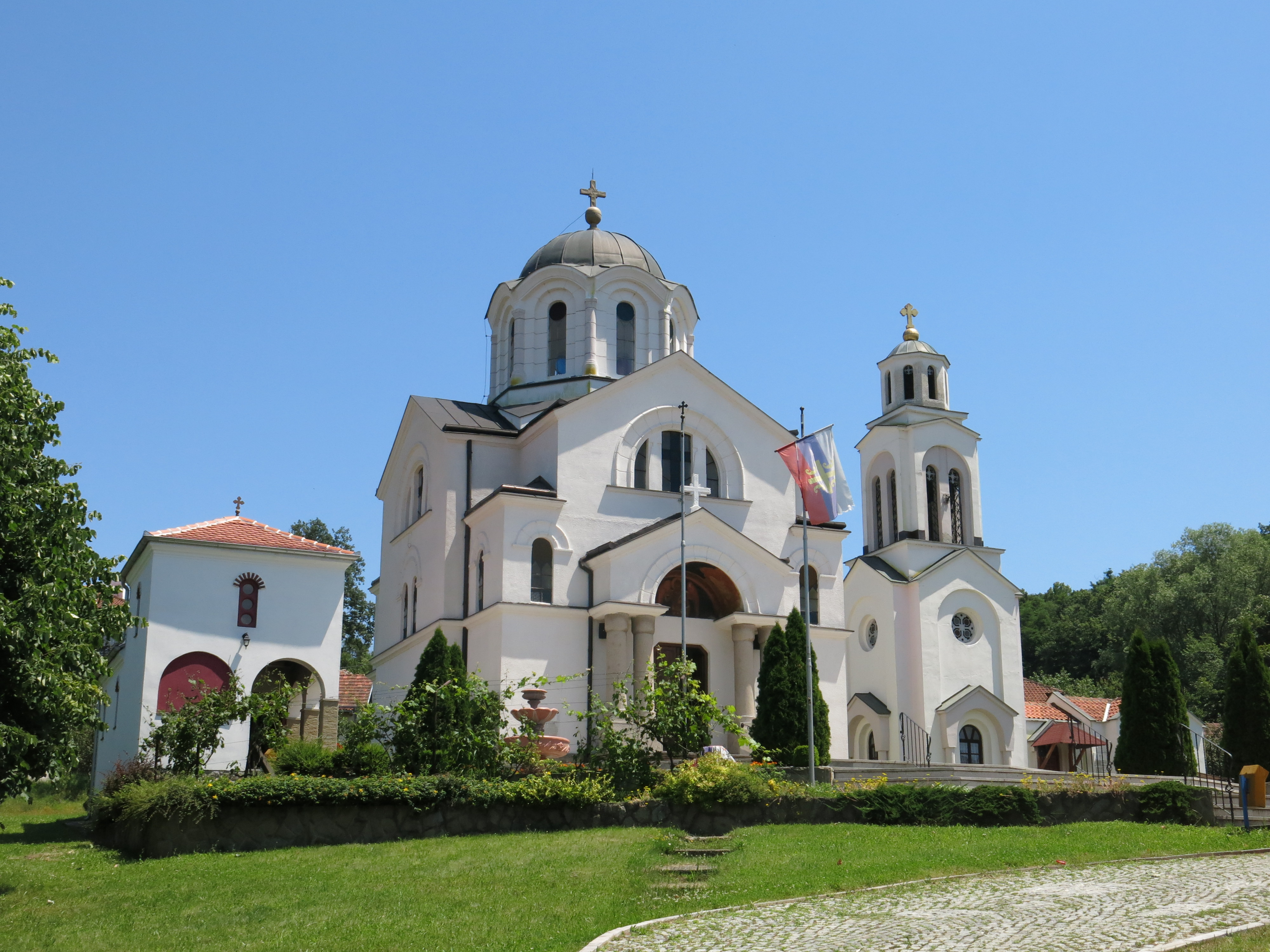
Church of St. Jovan

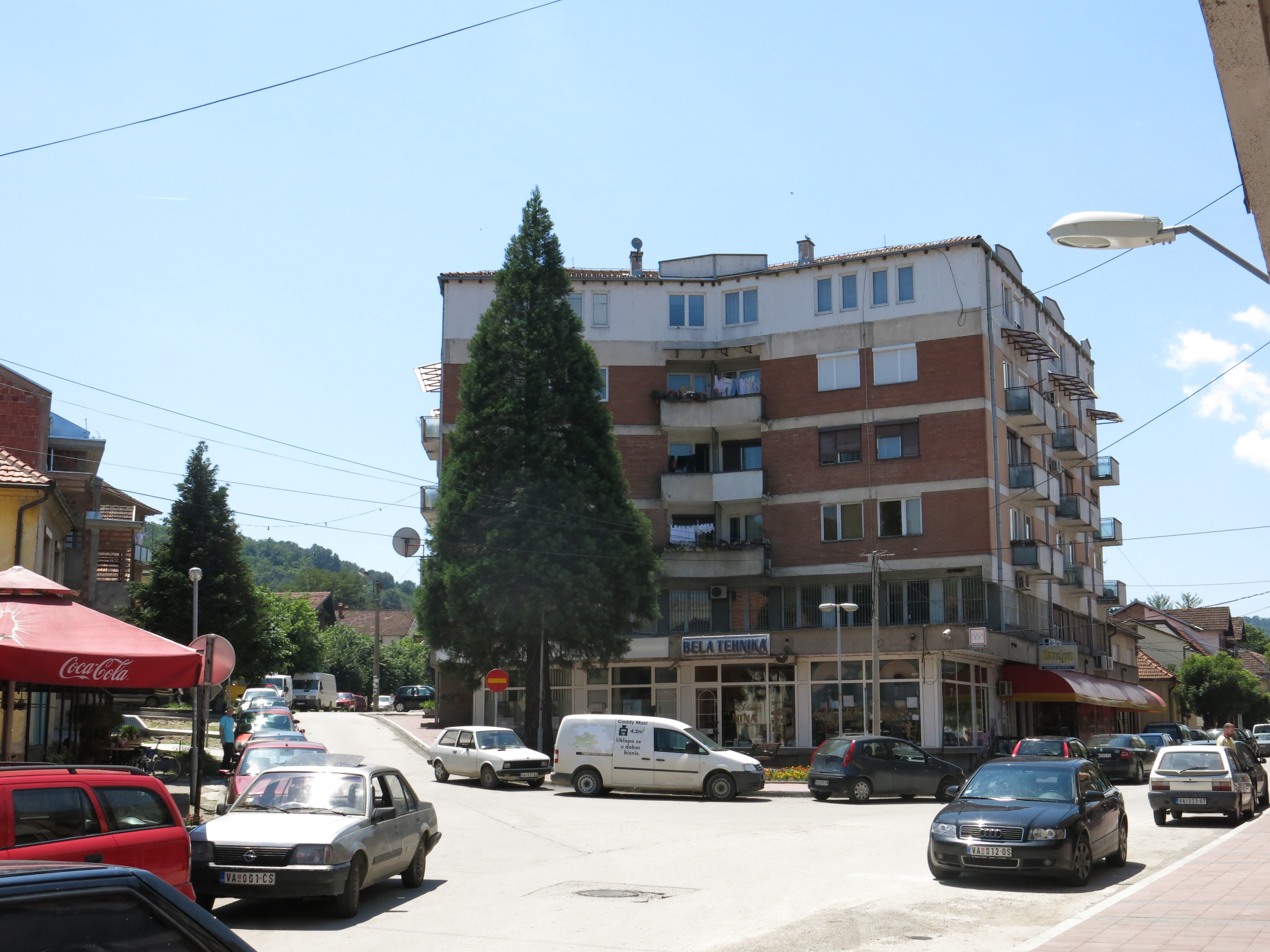
Ljig town center

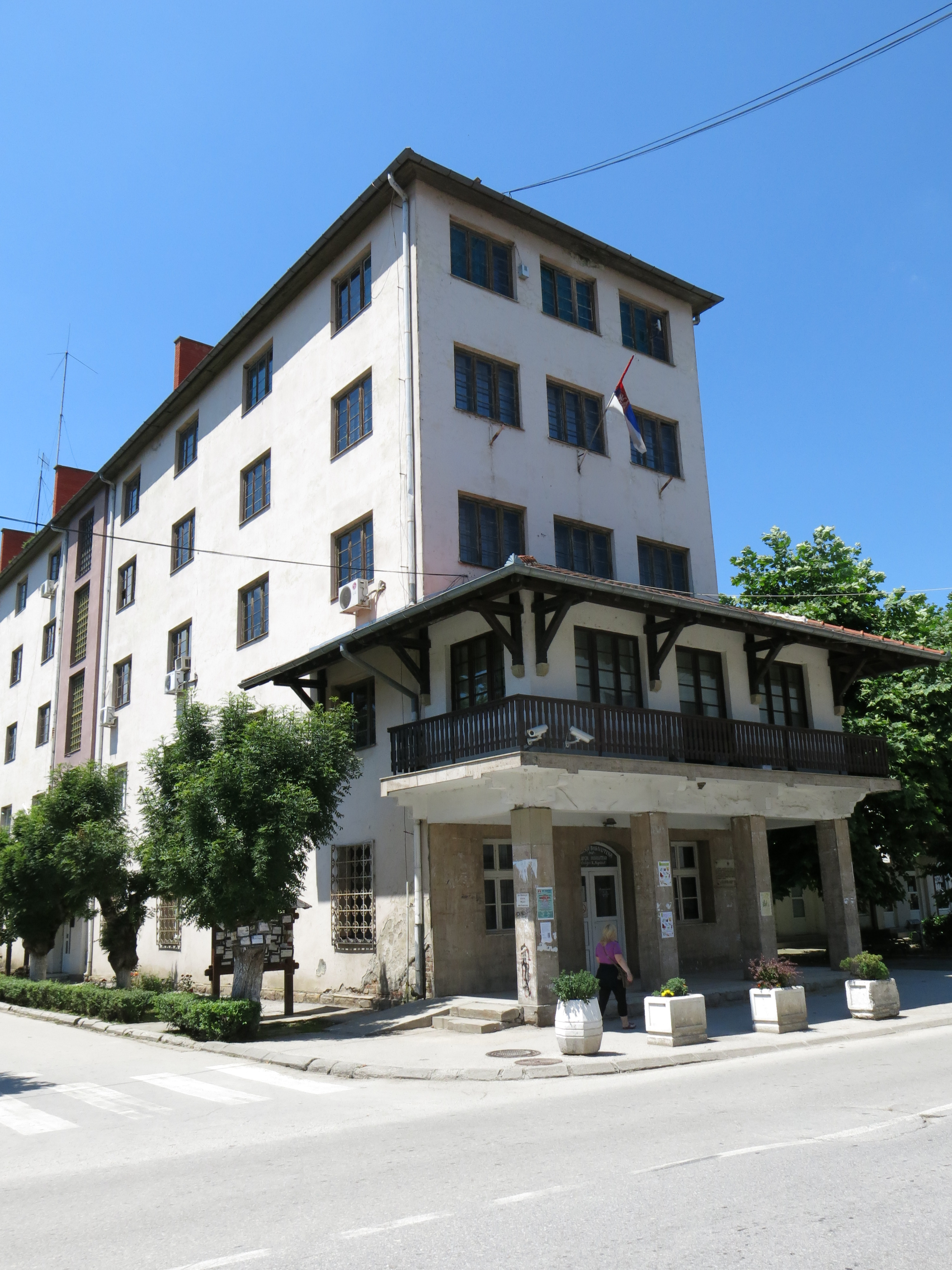
Ljig Children Library

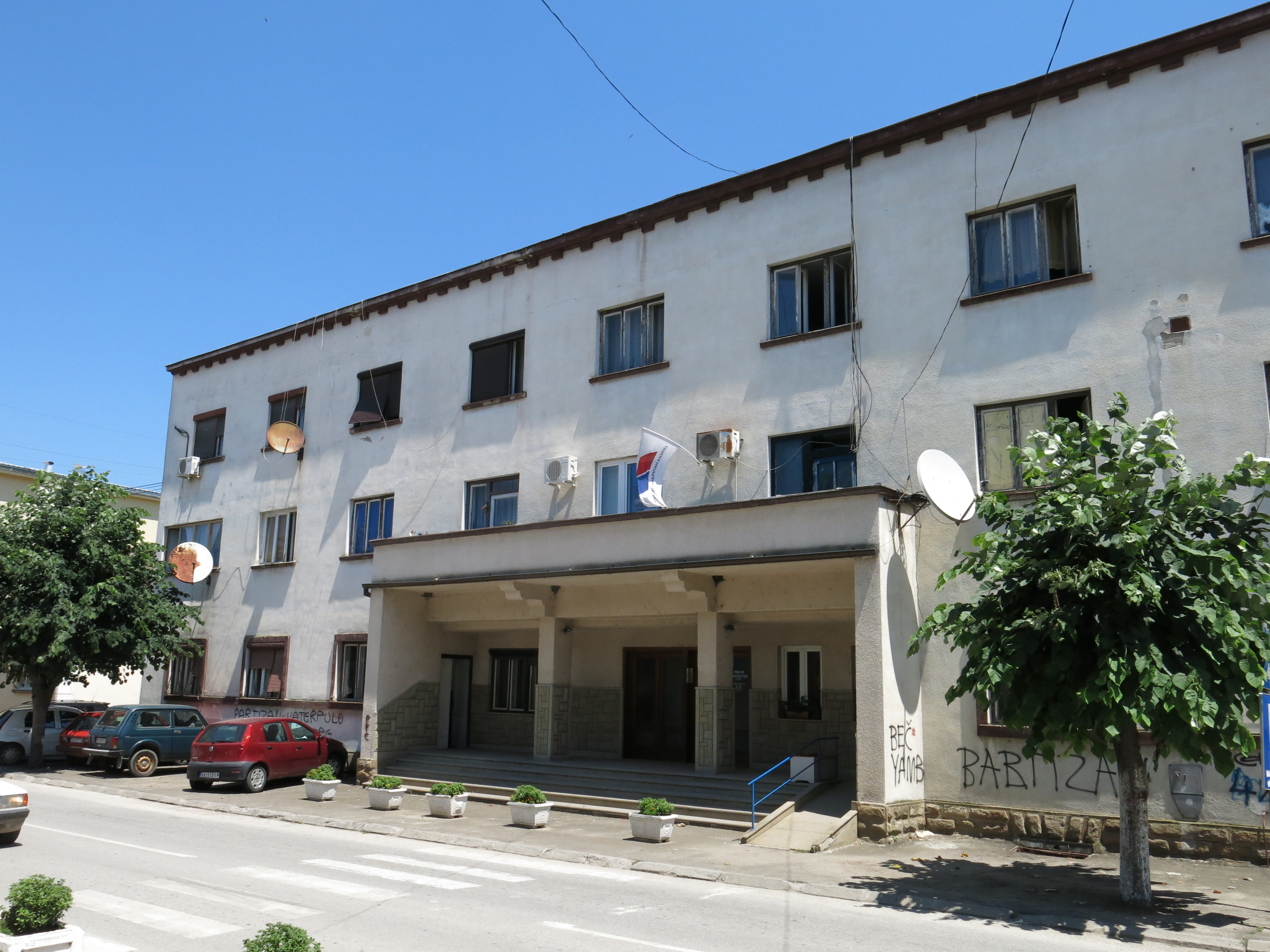
Ljig Library

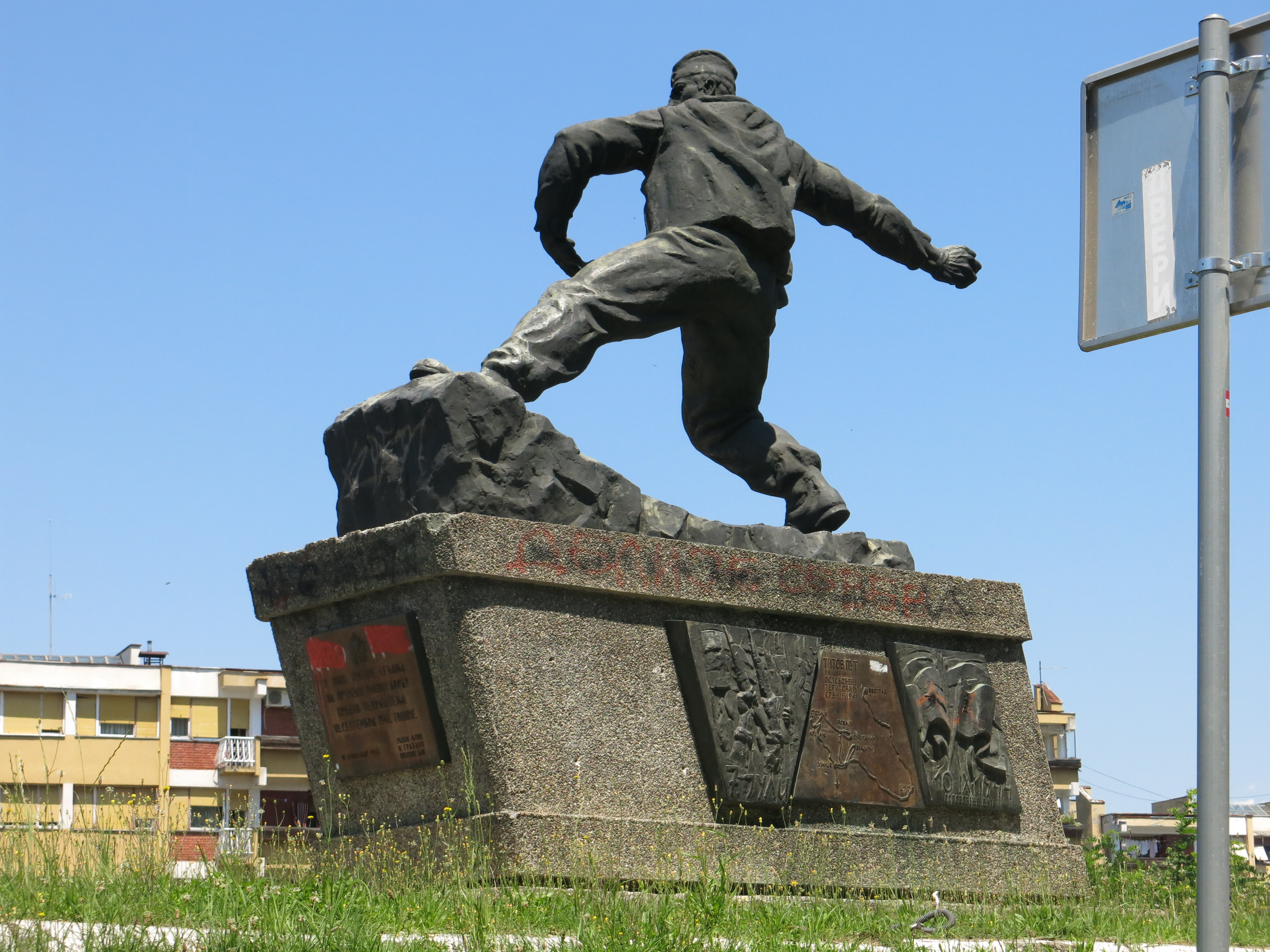
Monument to the battle in Ljig

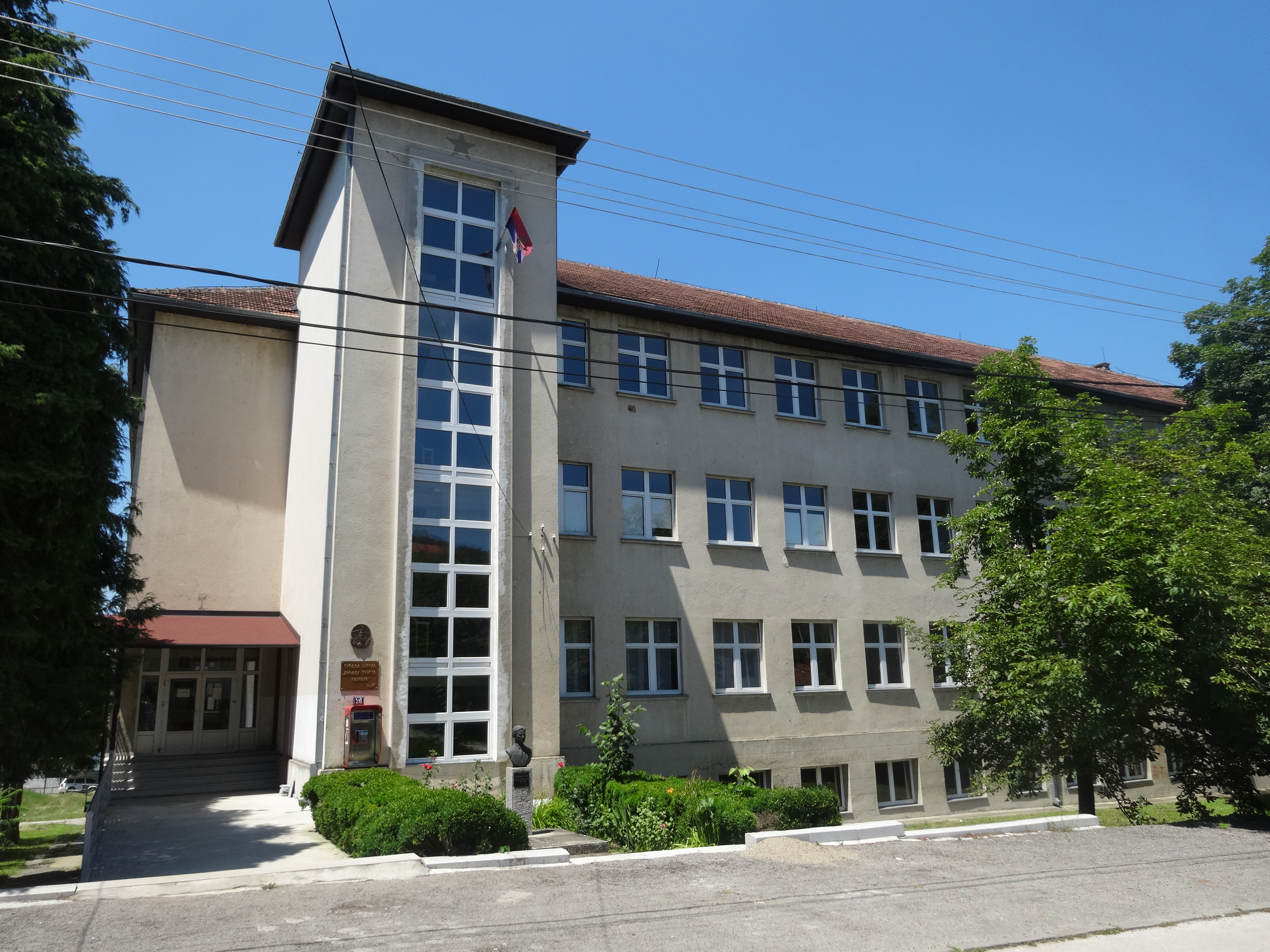
High School in Ljig

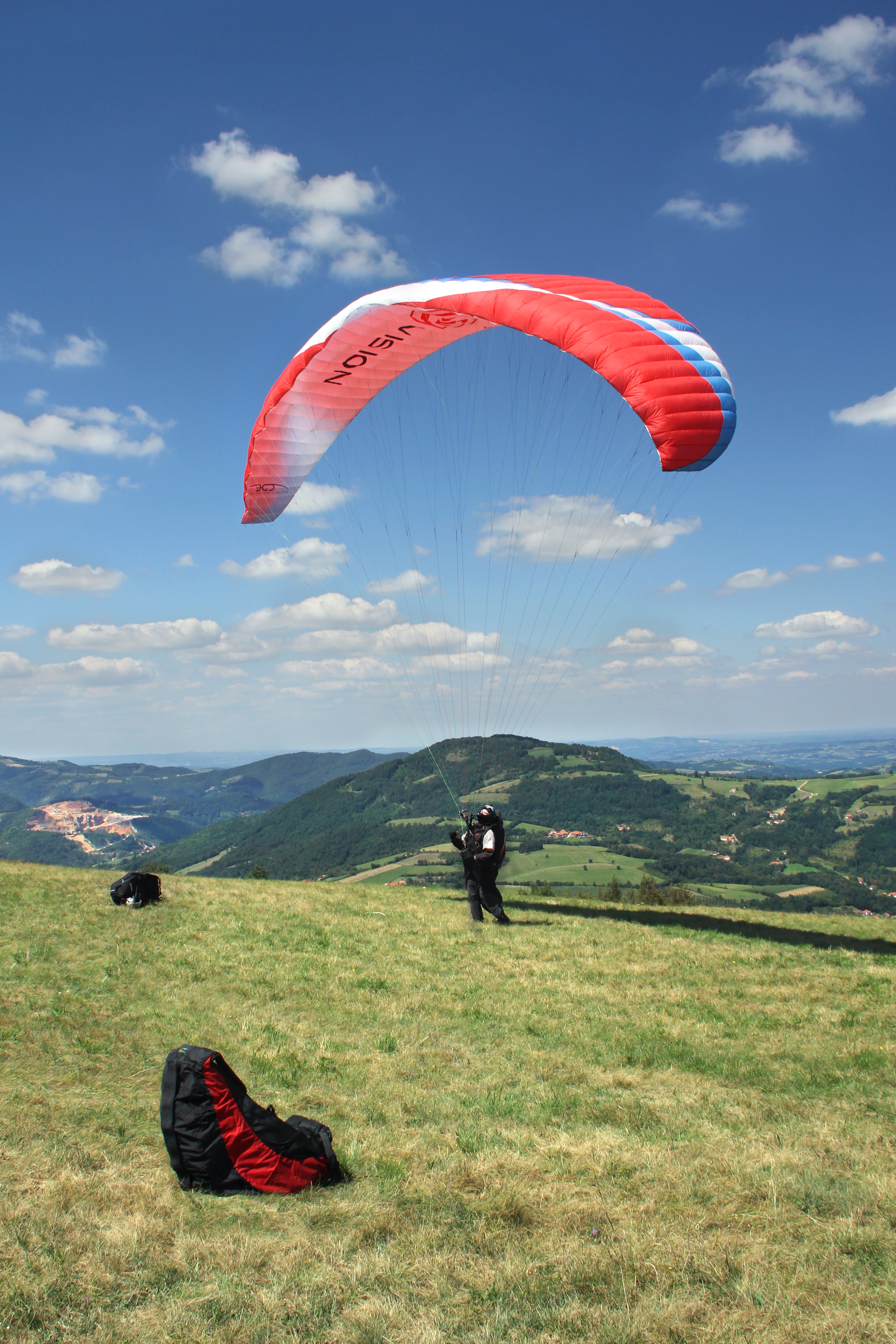
Rajac paragliding

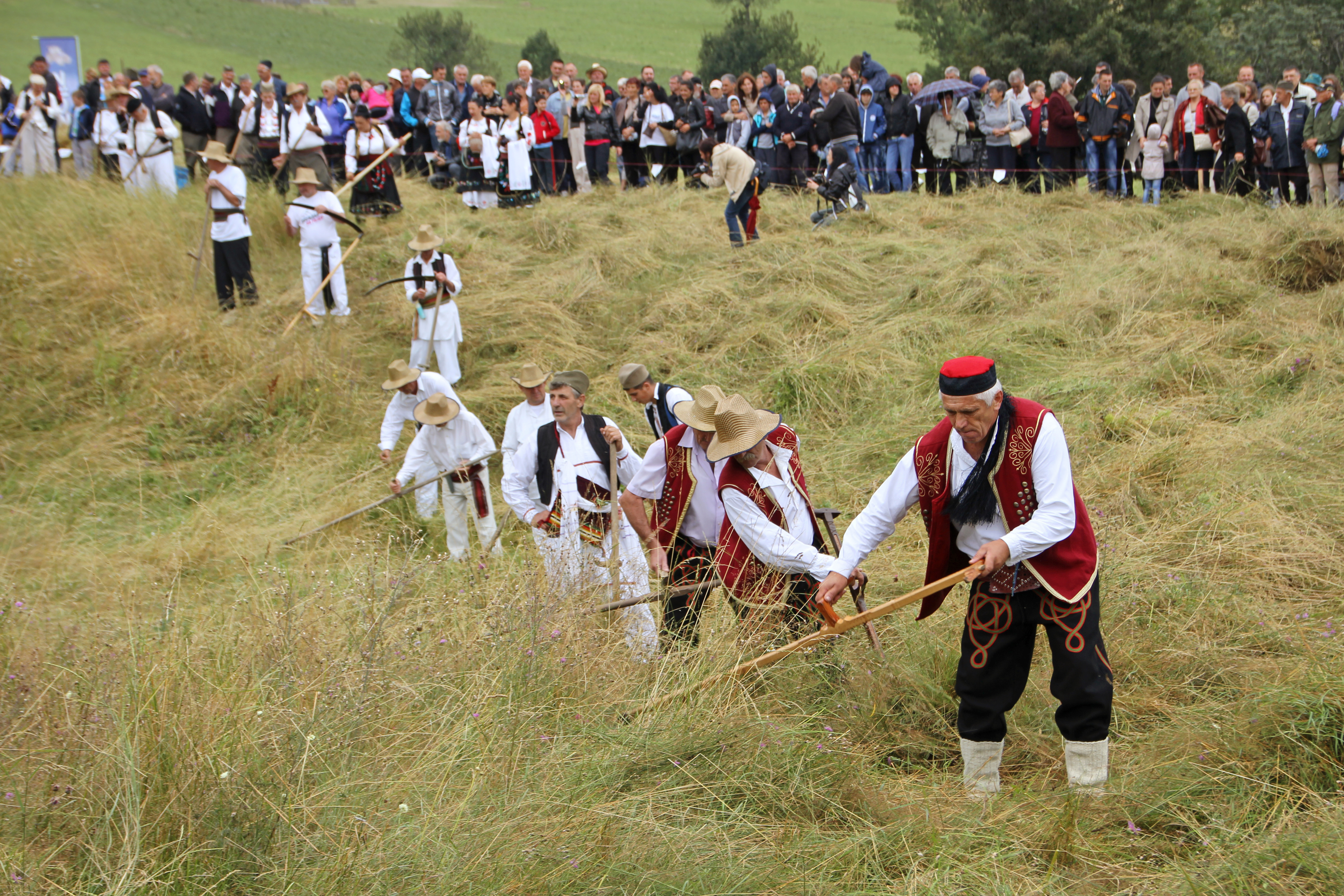
Rajac annual Mowing

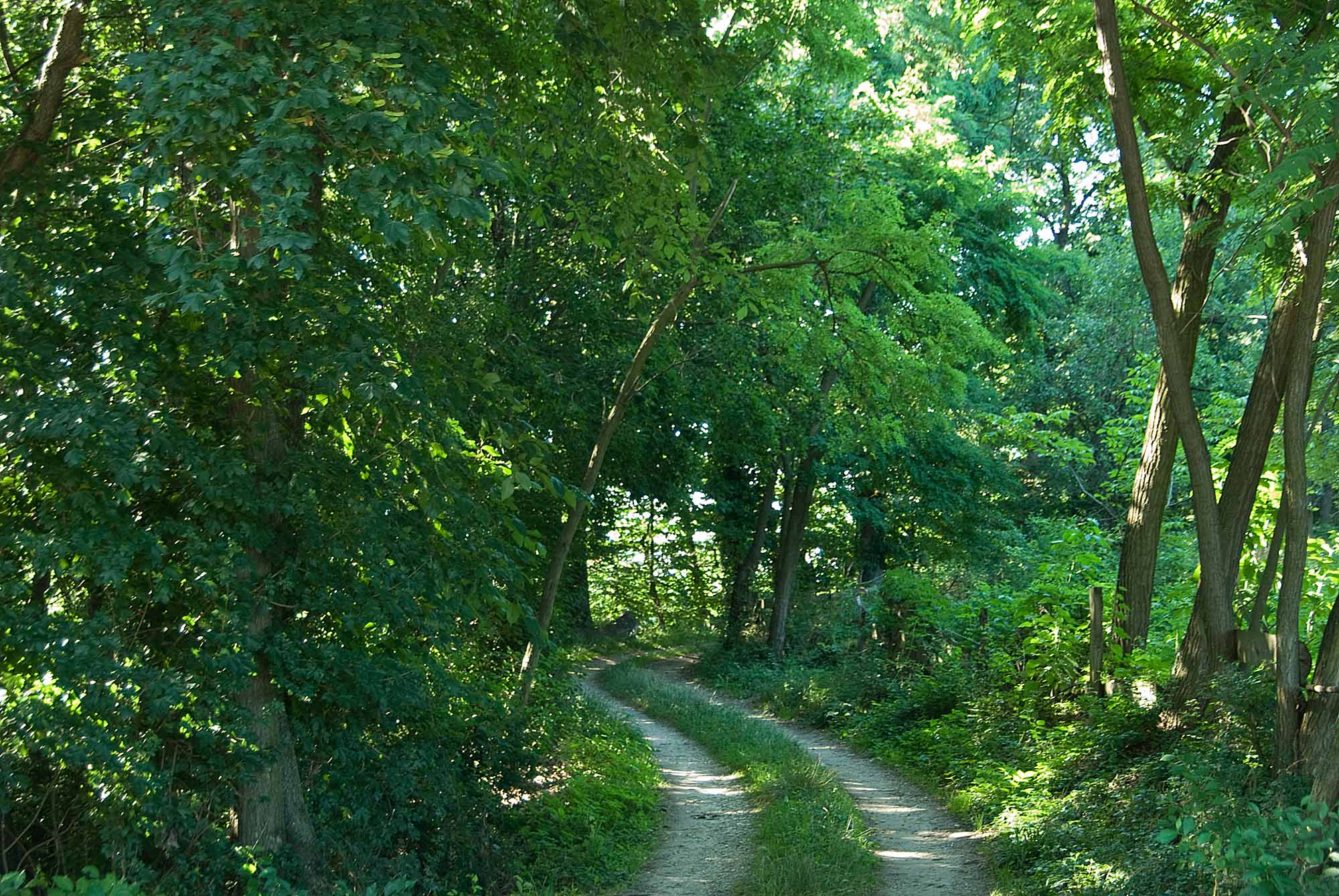
Cvetanovac Forrest

== See also ==
- List of populated places in Serbia

== Notes and references ==
Notes

1. "Plum brandy, the Internet and the world", European Agency for Reconstruction press release on Ljig
2. 2002 Serbian National Census
