= Paležnica =

Coordinates: 44.1789°N 20.1819°E

Paležnica Палежница
- Village (Selo)
- Interactive map of Paležnica
- Country: Serbia
- District: Kolubara District
- Municipality: Ljig
- Time zone: UTC+1 (CET)
  - Summer (DST): UTC+2 (CEST)

Paležnica is a village situated in Ljig municipality in Serbia.
