= Gukoš =

Coordinates: 44°12′49″N 20°13′47″E

- Village (Selo)
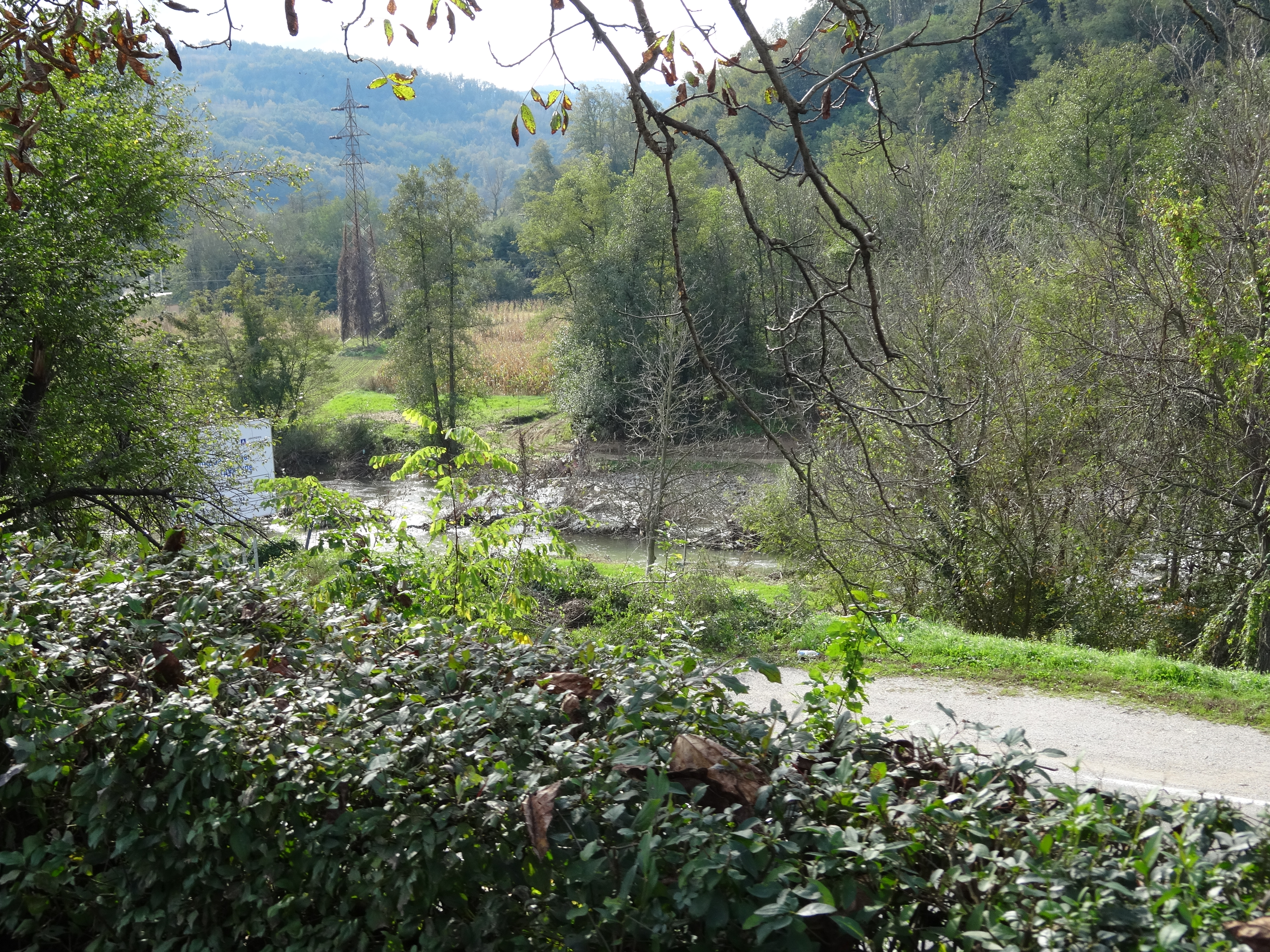
- Dragobilj river in Gukoš
- Interactive map of Gukoš
- Country: Serbia
- District: Kolubara
- Municipality: Ljig
- Time zone: UTC+1 (CET)
  - Summer (DST): UTC+2 (CEST)

Gukoš is a village situated in Ljig municipality in Serbia.
