= Lalinci =

Coordinates: 44.1606°N 20.2867°E

- Village (Selo)
- Interactive map of Lalinci
- Country: Serbia
- District: Kolubara District
- Municipality: Ljig
- Time zone: UTC+1 (CET)
  - Summer (DST): UTC+2 (CEST)

Lalinci is a village located in the Ljig municipality in Serbia.
