= Liplje (Ljig) =

Coordinates: 44.2556°N 20.3092°E

- Village (Selo)
- Interactive map of Liplje
- Country: Serbia
- District: Kolubara District
- Municipality: Ljig
- Time zone: UTC+1 (CET)
  - Summer (DST): UTC+2 (CEST)

Liplje is a village situated in Ljig municipality in Serbia.
