= Moravci (Ljig) =

Coordinates: 44.2417°N 20.2822°E

- Village (Selo)
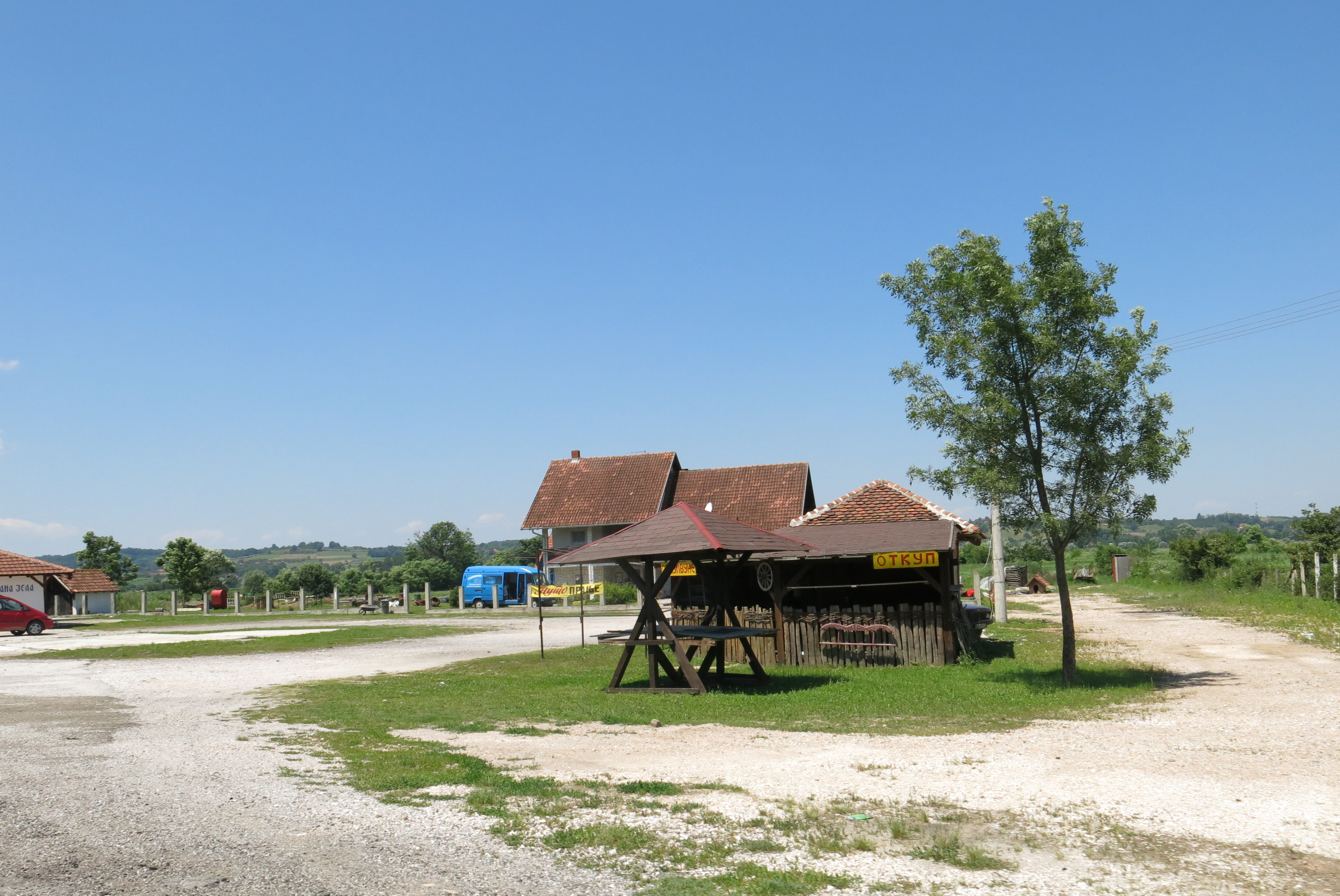
- Street of Moravci, Serbia
- Interactive map of Moravci
- Country: Serbia
- District: Kolubara District
- Municipality: Ljig
- Time zone: UTC+1 (CET)
  - Summer (DST): UTC+2 (CEST)

Moravci is a village situated in Ljig municipality in Serbia.

The village was active in the Serbian Revolution, being organized into the knežina (administrative unit) of Kačer during the First Serbian Uprising (1804–13). Priest Savo came from Moravci.
