= Donji Banjani =

Coordinates: 44.1814°N 20.2828°E

- Village (Selo)
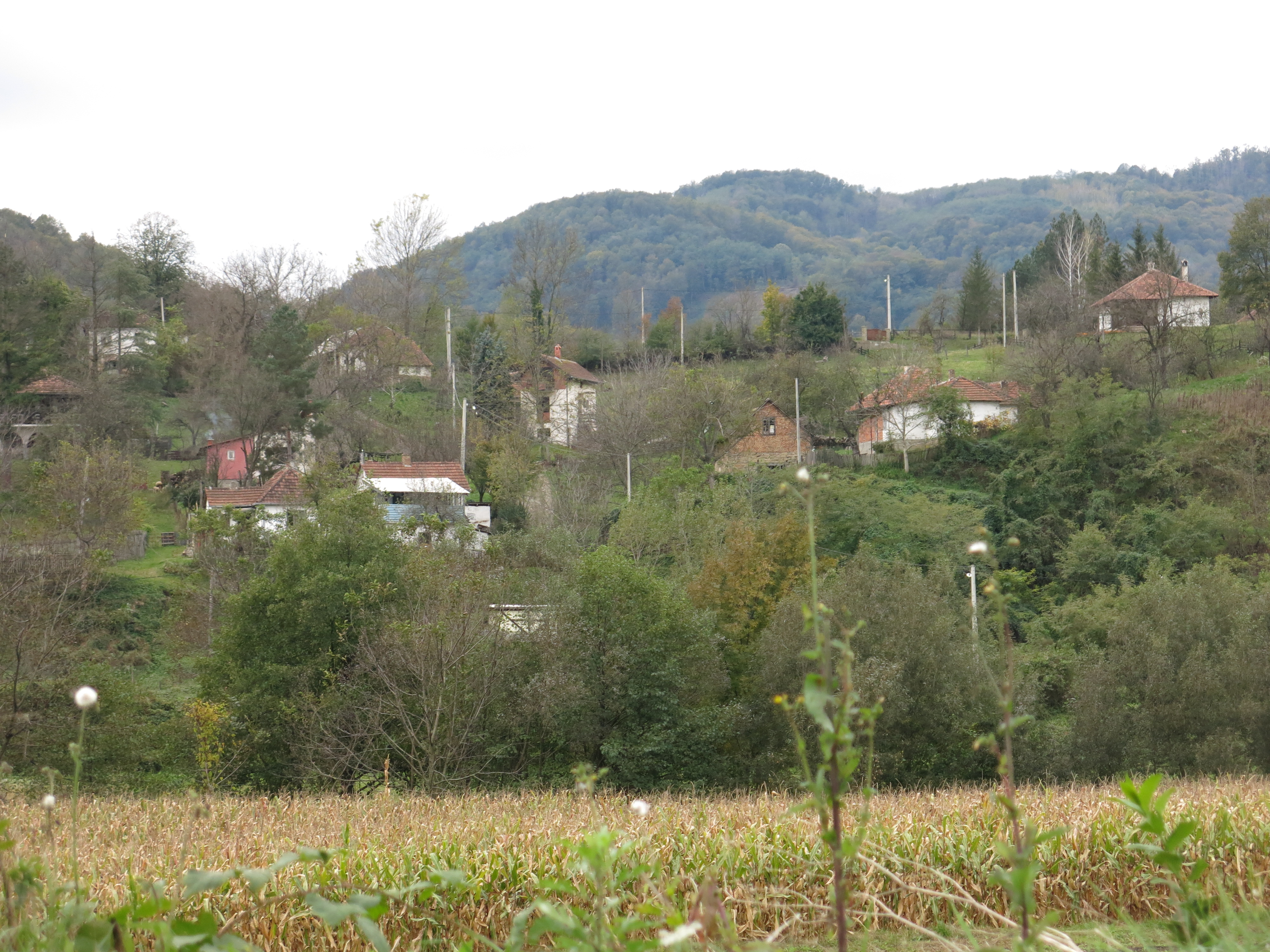
- View of Donji Banjani village
- Interactive map of Donji Banjani
- Country: Serbia
- District: Kolubara
- Municipality: Ljig
- Time zone: UTC+1 (CET)
  - Summer (DST): UTC+2 (CEST)

Donji Banjani is a village situated in Ljig municipality in Serbia.
