= Jajčić =

Coordinates: 44°15′43″N 20°15′26″E

- Village (Selo)
- Interactive map of Jajčić
- Country: Serbia
- District: Kolubara District
- Municipality: Ljig
- Time zone: UTC+1 (CET)
  - Summer (DST): UTC+2 (CEST)

Jajčić is a village situated in Ljig municipality in Serbia.
