= Dići =

Coordinates: 44°11′54″N 20°16′24″E

- Village (Selo)
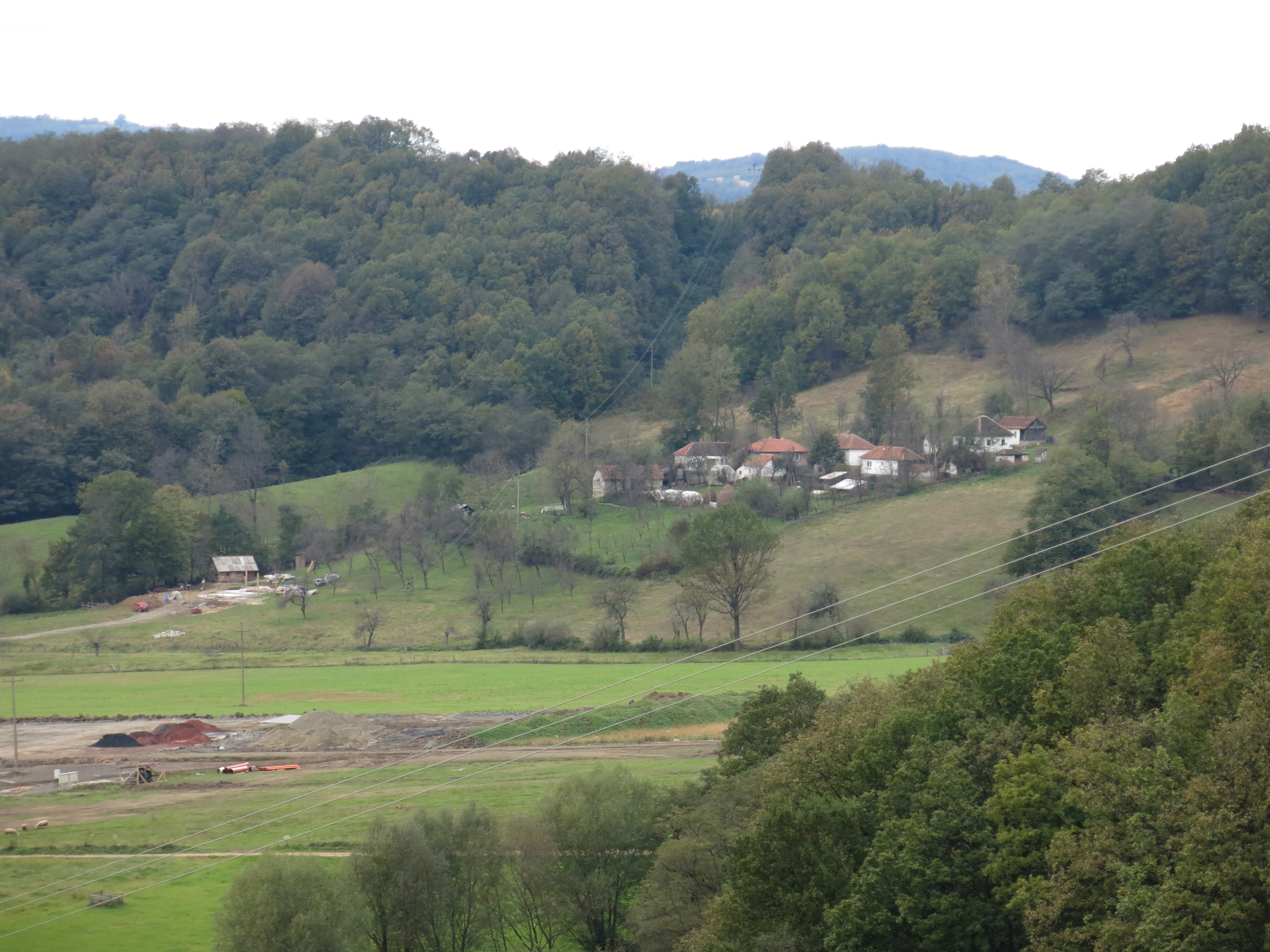
- Interactive map of Dići
- Country: Serbia
- District: Kolubara
- Municipality: Ljig
- Time zone: UTC+1 (CET)
  - Summer (DST): UTC+2 (CEST)

Dići is a village situated in Ljig municipality in Serbia. The town is known for having a medieval church dedicated to St. John, and being the burial place of 14th-century nobleman Vlgdrag.
