= Ivanovci (Ljig) =

Coordinates: 44.2236°N 20.3117°E

Ivanovci Ивановци
- Village (Selo)
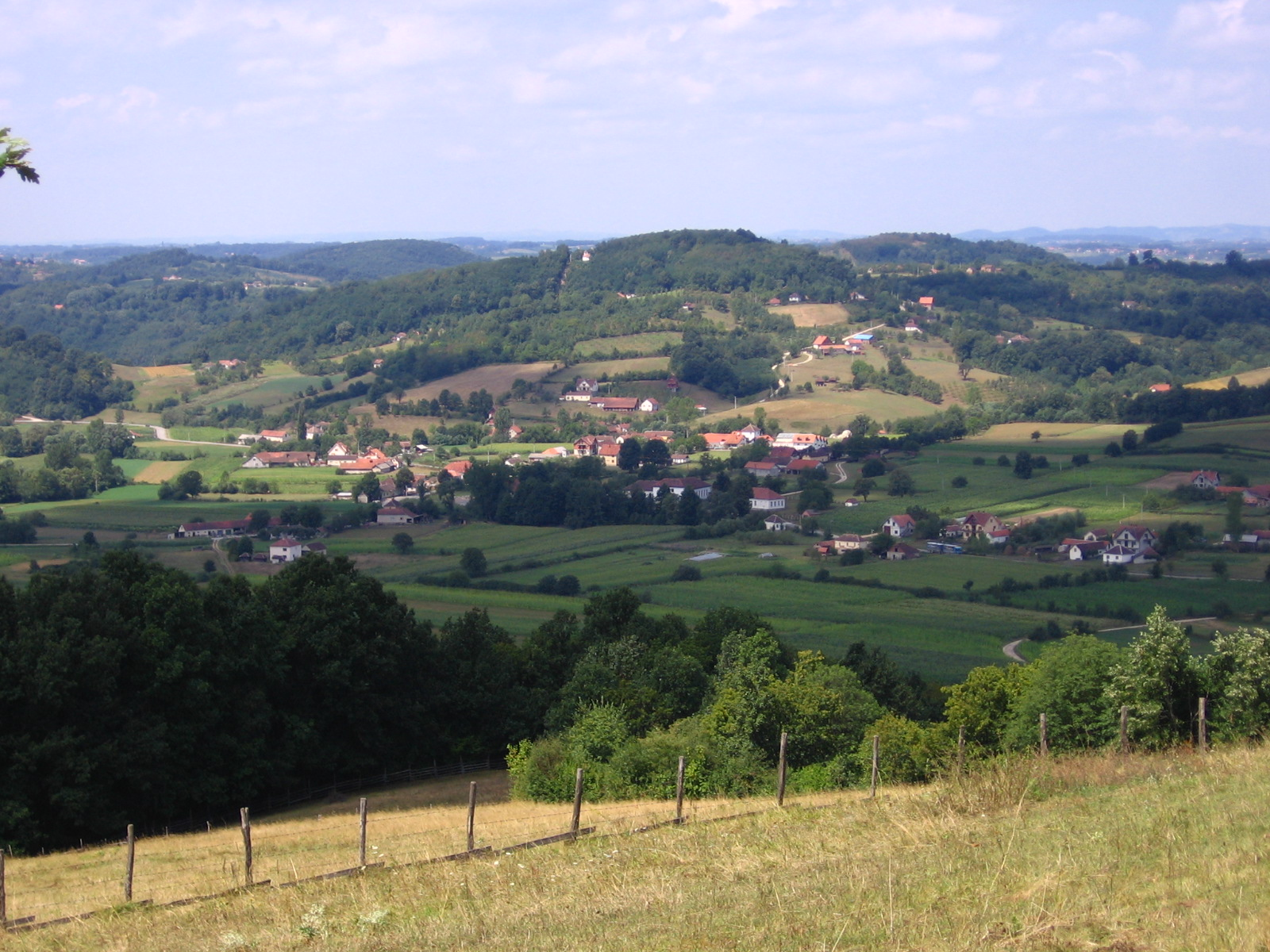
- Interactive map of Ivanovci
- Country: Serbia
- District: Kolubara District
- Municipality: Ljig
- Time zone: UTC+1 (CET)
  - Summer (DST): UTC+2 (CEST)

Ivanovci is a village situated in Ljig municipality in Serbia.

== Demography ==
According to the 2002 census, there were 468 inhabitants vs 539 in the 1991 census (the third consecutive decline). The 392 adult residents average 46.1 years of age (44.7 for men and 47.3 for women). The village has 148 households, each with an average 3.16 people living there. This village is inhabited mostly by Serbs (according to the census of 2002).

Population changes during the 20th century
