= Bošnjanović =

Coordinates: 44.2569°N 20.1889°E

- Village (Selo)
- Interactive map of Bošnjanović
- Country: Serbia
- District: Kolubara
- Municipality: Ljig
- Time zone: UTC+1 (CET)
  - Summer (DST): UTC+2 (CEST)

Bošnjanović is a village situated in Ljig municipality in Serbia.
