= Kalanjevci =

- Village (Selo)
- Location within Serbia
- Coordinates: 44°16′N 20°24′E
- Country: Serbia
- District: Kolubara District
- Municipality: Ljig
- Time zone: UTC+1 (CET)
  - Summer (DST): UTC+2 (CEST)

Kalanjevci is a village situated in Ljig municipality in Serbia.
