= Milavac =

Coordinates: 44.2478°N 20.2153°E

- Village (Selo)
- Interactive map of Milavac
- Country: Serbia
- District: Kolubara District
- Municipality: Ljig
- Time zone: UTC+1 (CET)
  - Summer (DST): UTC+2 (CEST)

Cvetanovac is a village situated in Ljig municipality in Serbia.
