= Babajić =

Coordinates: 44.2331°N 20.2050°E

- Village (Selo)
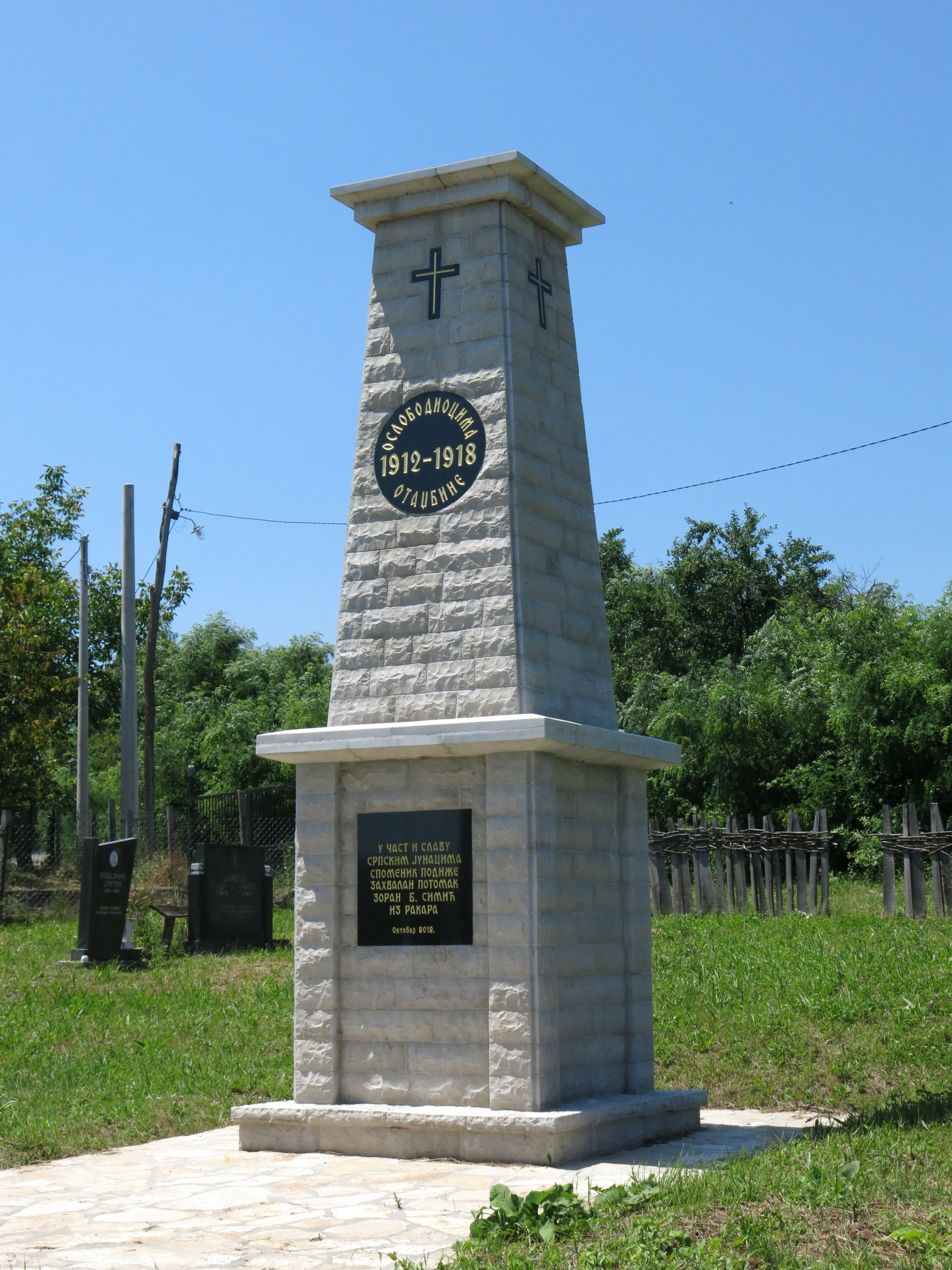
- Monument to the liberators of homeland, Babajić
- Interactive map of Babajić
- Country: Serbia
- Municipality: Ljig
- Time zone: UTC+1 (CET)
  - Summer (DST): UTC+2 (CEST)

Babajić is a village situated in Ljig municipality, Kolubara District in Serbia.
