= Brančić =

Coordinates: 44°12′27″N 20°15′43″E

- Village (Selo)
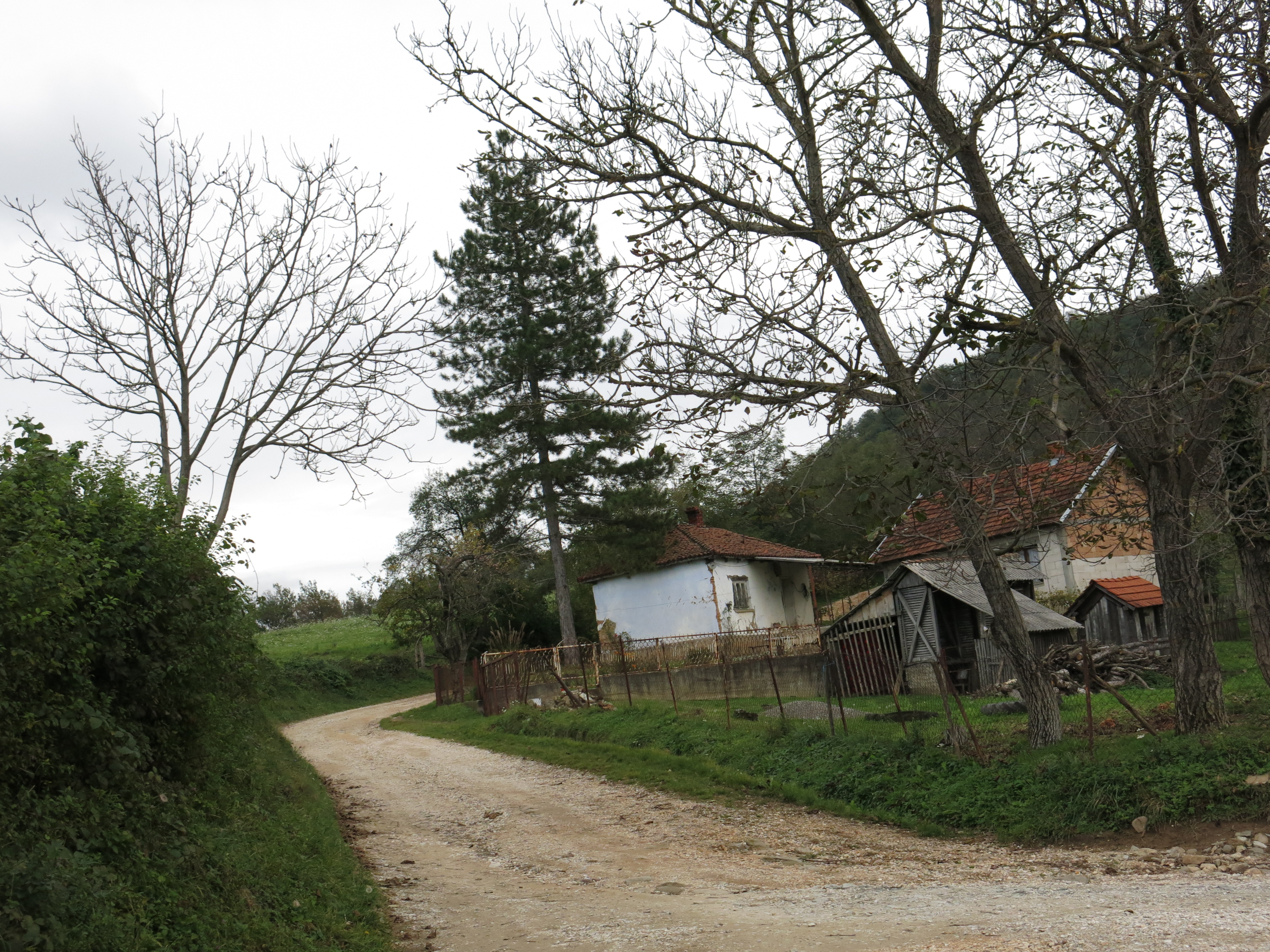
- Brančić, Street
- Interactive map of Brančić
- Country: Serbia
- District: Kolubara
- Municipality: Ljig
- Time zone: UTC+1 (CET)
  - Summer (DST): UTC+2 (CEST)

Brančić is a village situated in Ljig municipality, Kolubara District in Serbia.
