= Latković =

Coordinates: 44°16′N 20°14′E

- Village (Selo)
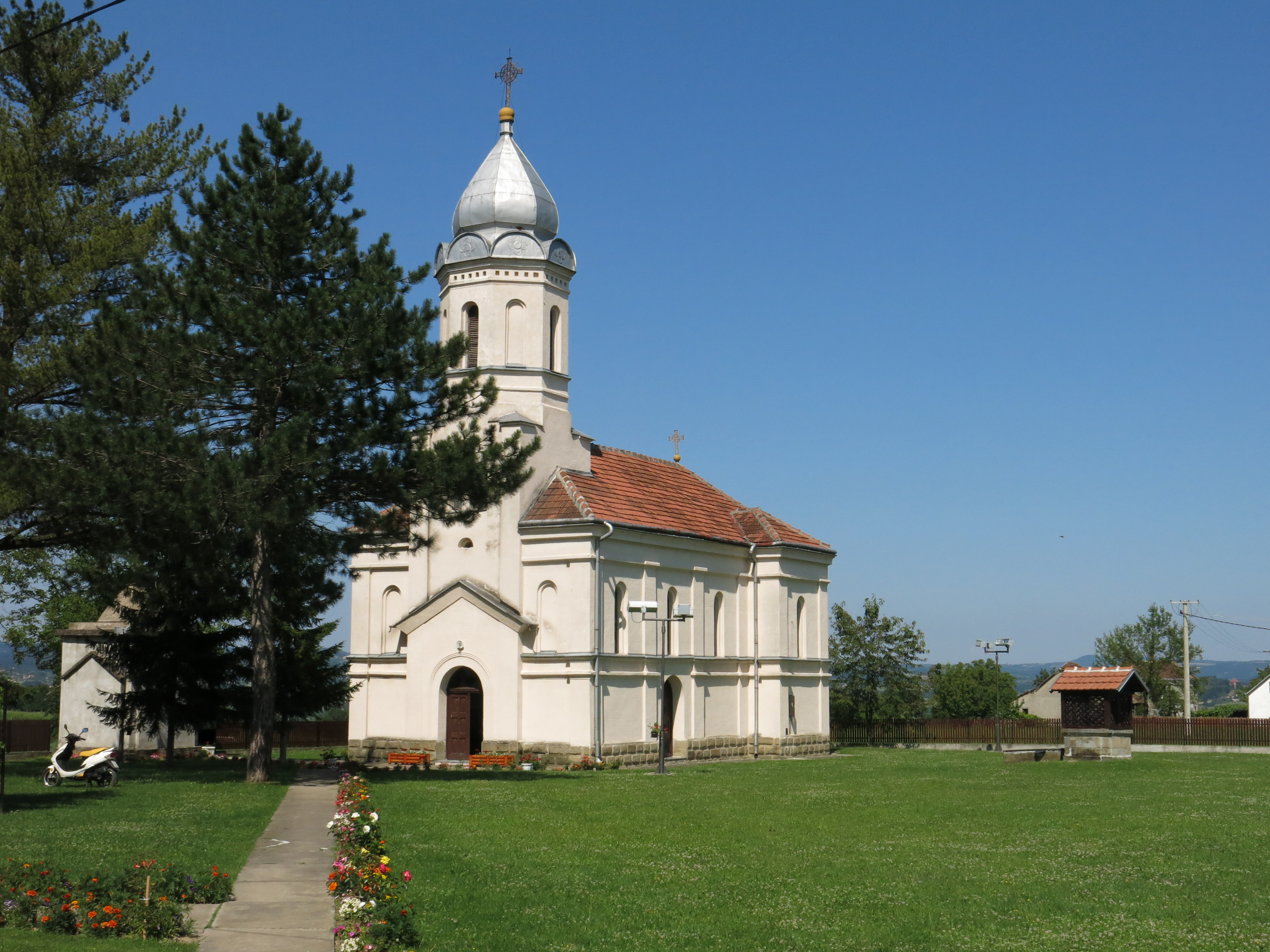
- Church of Saint George in Latković
- Interactive map of Latković
- Country: Serbia
- District: Kolubara District
- Municipality: Ljig
- Time zone: UTC+1 (CET)
  - Summer (DST): UTC+2 (CEST)

Latković is a village situated in Ljig municipality in Serbia.
