= Suvobor =

Mountain in Serbia

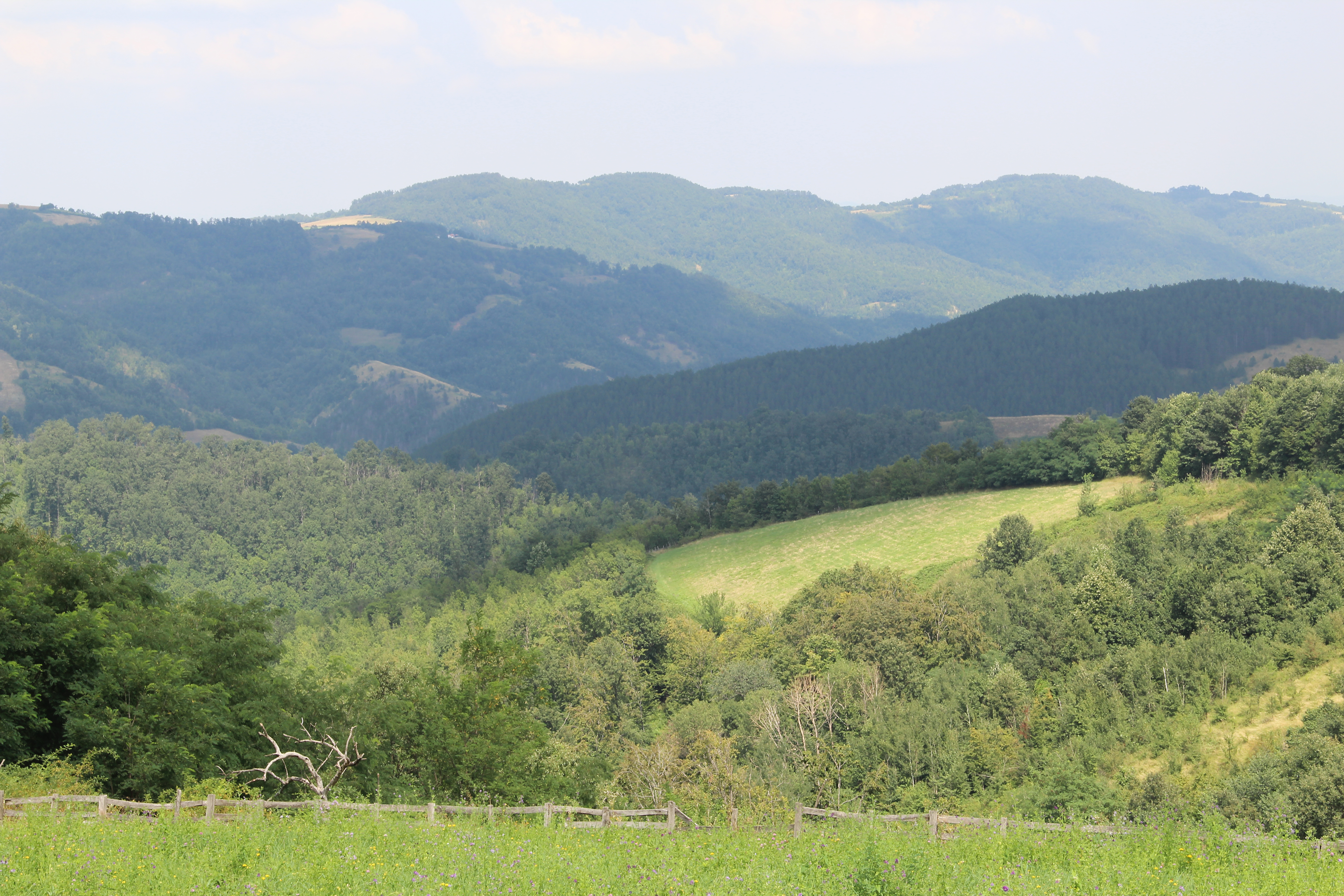

Highest point
- Elevation: 866 m (2,841 ft)
- Coordinates: 44°07′16″N 20°10′55″E

Geography
- Location within Serbia
- Location: Western Serbia
- Parent range: Dinaric Alps

Suvobor (Serbian Cyrillic: Сувобор) is a mountain in western Serbia, near the town of Gornji Milanovac. Its highest peak, Suvobor, has an elevation of 866 m (2,841 ft) above sea level. The northwestern part of Suvobor is called Mount Rajac (847 m) and is generally developed the best for tourism. Vrujci spa is located on the northern slopes of Suvobor.

== History ==
Suvobor and Rajac were the site of Battle of Kolubara of the World War I in December 1914. In World War II, Suvobor was a stronghold of Chetnik movement, and their leader Draža Mihailović had the main headquarters at Ravna Gora. After World War II forest rangers planted conifer trees on the naturally bare summit of the mountain.

== Wildlife ==
The valleys around Suvobor are covered with young oak forests, its slopes on the other hand are covered with conifer trees. On the slopes of the mountain different animal species can be found like roe deer, hare and pheasant.

== See also ==
- List of mountains in Serbia
