= Vukdrag =

Serbian nobleman

- čelnik [of the Serbian kingdom]
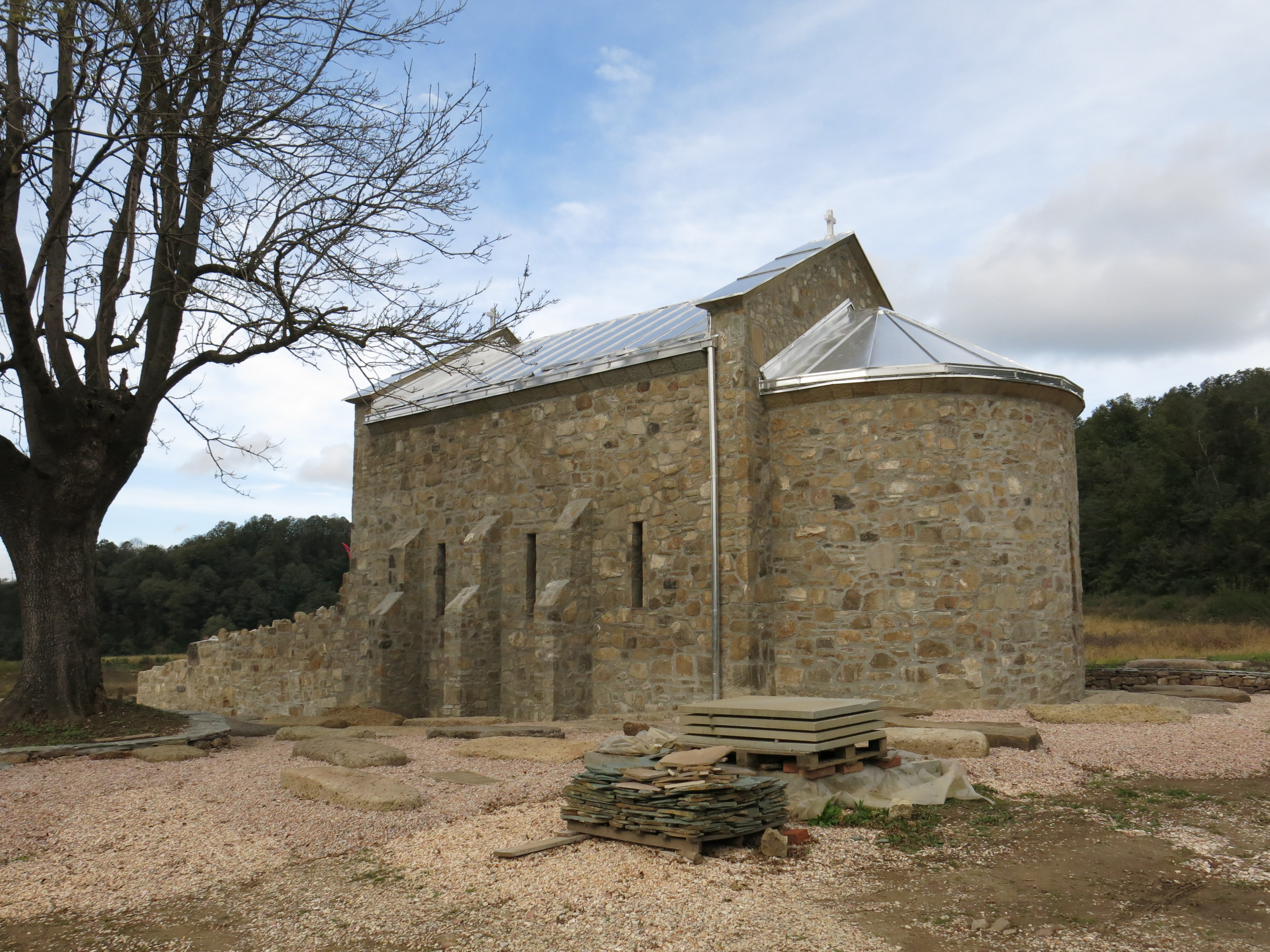
- Vukdrag founded the Church of St. John the Baptist in Dići, where he was buried in 1327.
- Born: Kingdom of Serbia
- Died: 8 May 1327
- Buried: Church of St. John the Baptist in Dići (near Ljig, central Serbia)
- Spouse: Vladislava (nun Ana)
- Occupation: magnate

Vukdrag (Serbian Cyrillic: Вукдраг; d. 1327) was a Serbian nobleman who served King Stefan Dečanski (r. 1321–31) as čelnik. He was a magnate in the Rudnik mountain area, who founded (as the ktetor) the Raška style church in Dići (near Ljig, central Serbia), below the Rudnik, before 1327, most likely as a family temple. He must have had one of the important gubernatorial functions in the Rudnik oblast (province) during the reigns of kings Stefan Milutin (r. 1282–1321) and Stefan Dečanski. Unknown in historical sources, he was buried in his church, where his gravestone inscription tells that he died on 8 May 1327, on the Feast of the Ascension (Spasovdan), and that he had taken monastic vows as Nikola (Никола) and [once] held the title of čelnik. It is unclear if there was one or several individuals with that title at the court at that time; Đuraš Ilijić (fl. 1326–62) was mentioned with the title in 1326, and Gradislav Vojšić (fl. 1284–1327), for the second time, in 1327. He was buried in a special tomb inside the church, and his gravestone was set by his wife Vladislava (nun Ana). The unearthing of the gravestone gave new facts in the understanding of the territorial contours of the Serbian state north of Rudnik at the end of the 13th- and beginning of 14th century. The largest medieval necropolis in Serbia was unearthed around the church, with flat gravestones (more than 180 slabs) belonging to the oldest phase of the Stećak culture.

== Annotations ==
1. Archaically rendered Vlgdrag (Влгдраг), Vlkdrag (Влкдраг); modern forms Vukdrag (Вукдраг) and Vukodrag (Вукодраг). It is an old Serbian name, found in medieval epigraphy. It is an apotropaic name, derived from vuk ("wolf") and drag ("dear").

== Sources ==
- Anthropologischer Anzeiger (2001). Anthropologischer Anzeiger. Vol. 59. E. Schweizerbart'sche Verlagsbuchhandlung (E. Nägele). p. 114.
- Blagojević, Miloš (2001). Državna uprava u srpskim srednjovekovnim zemljama. Službeni list SRJ. ISBN 9788635504971.
- Đorđević, Ivan M.; Vojvodić, Dragan; Marković, Miodrag (2008). Studije srpske srednjovekovne umetnosti. Zavod za Udžbenike. p. 481. ISBN 9788617147400.
- Erdeljan, Jelena (1996). Medieval funerary monuments in the region of Ras. Arheološki institut, Beograd. ISBN 978-86-80093-10-9.
- Janićijević, Jovan (1998). The cultural treasury of Serbia. IDEA. p. 339. ISBN 9788675470397.
- Kalezić, Dimitrije M. (2002). Enciklopedija pravoslavlja. Savremena administracija. ISBN 9788638706716.
- Novak, Viktor (2009). Revue historique. Vol. 58. Istorijski institut u Beogradu. p. 95.
- Stamenković, Srboljub Đ. (2002). Geografska enciklopedija: naselja Srbije. Geografski fakultet. p. 499. ISBN 9788682657149.
