= Veliševac =

Coordinates: 44°12′53″N 20°12′31″E

- Village (Selo)
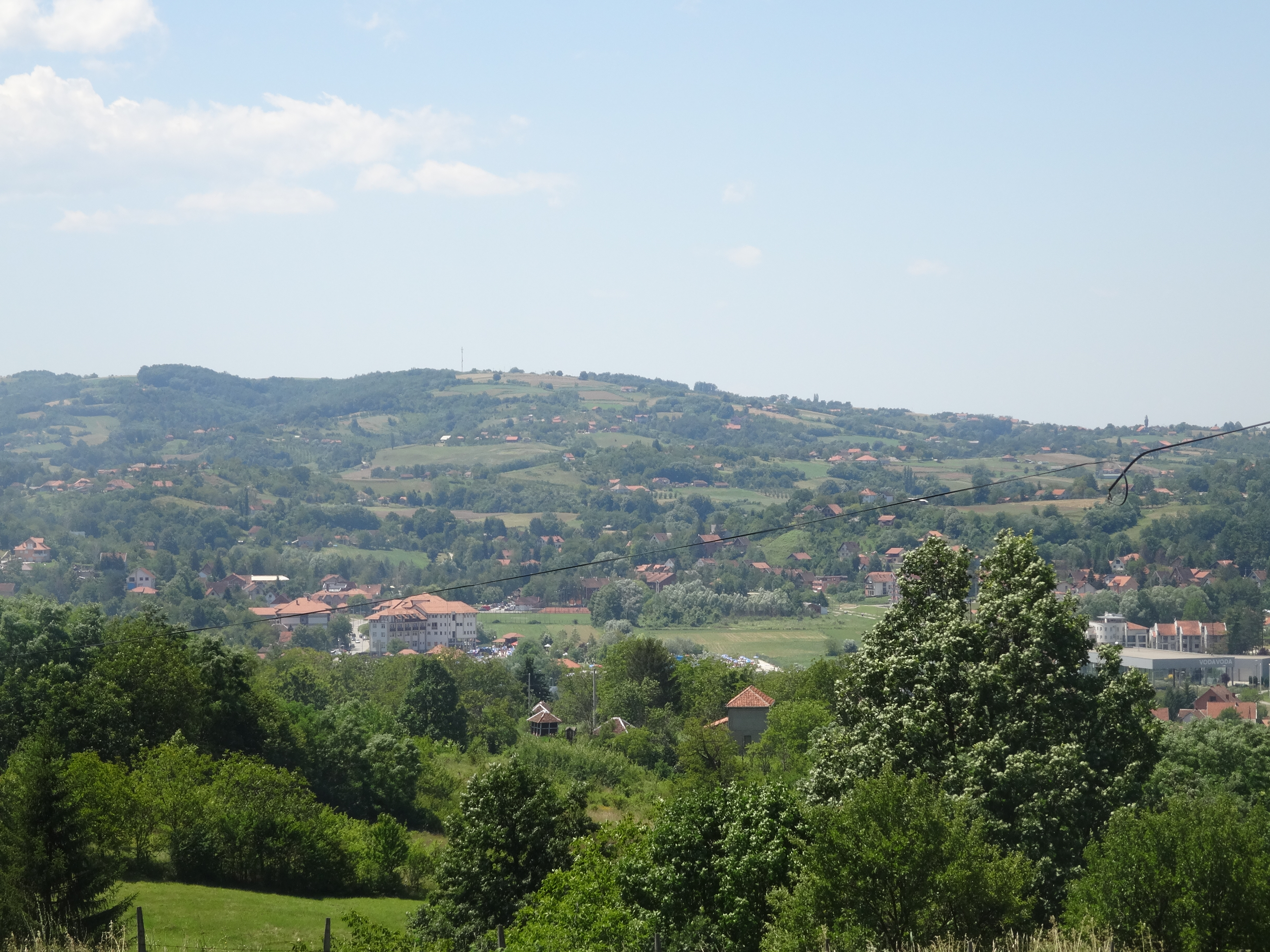
- View of Veliševac
- Interactive map of Veliševac
- Country: Serbia
- District: Kolubara District
- Municipality: Ljig
- Time zone: UTC+1 (CET)
  - Summer (DST): UTC+2 (CEST)

Veliševac (pr. Veliševac) is a village situated in Ljig municipality in Serbia.
