= Čumovo =

Čumovo Чумово
- Village
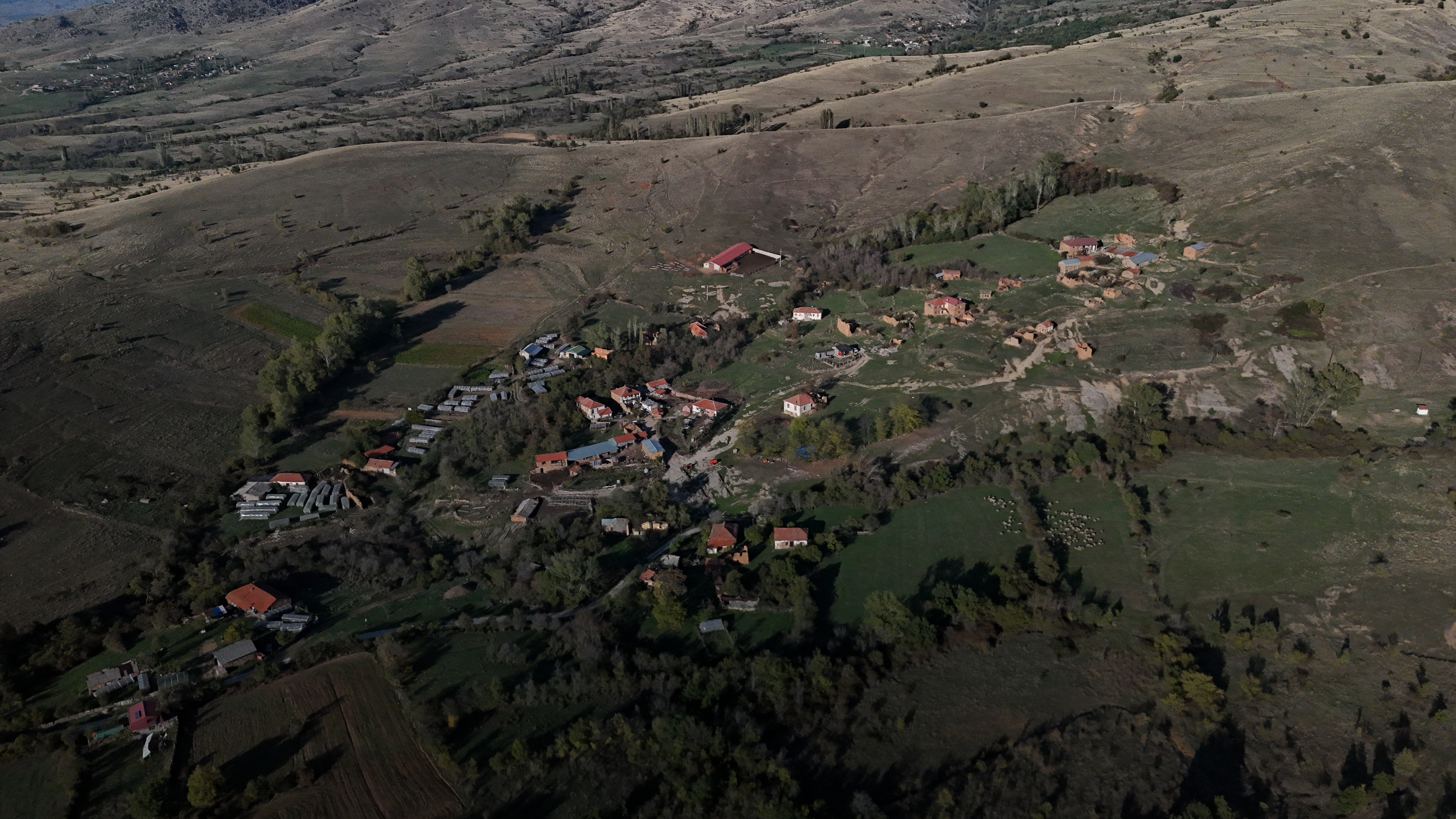
- Air view of the village

- Location within North Macedonia
- Coordinates: 41.281972°N 21.568175°E
- Country: North Macedonia
- Region: Pelagonia
- Municipality: Prilep
- Elevation: 779 m (2,556 ft)

Population (2021)
  - Total: 6
- Time zone: UTC+1 (CET)
- Postal code: 7501
- Area code: +389-48

Čumovo (Macedonian: Чумово) is a village located in the Municipality of Prilep, North Macedonia.

== Demographics ==
According to the 2002 census, the village had a total of 17 inhabitants. Ethnic groups in the village include:

- Macedonians 17
