= Štavica (Ljig) =

Coordinates: 44.1867°N 20.3364°E

- Village (Selo)
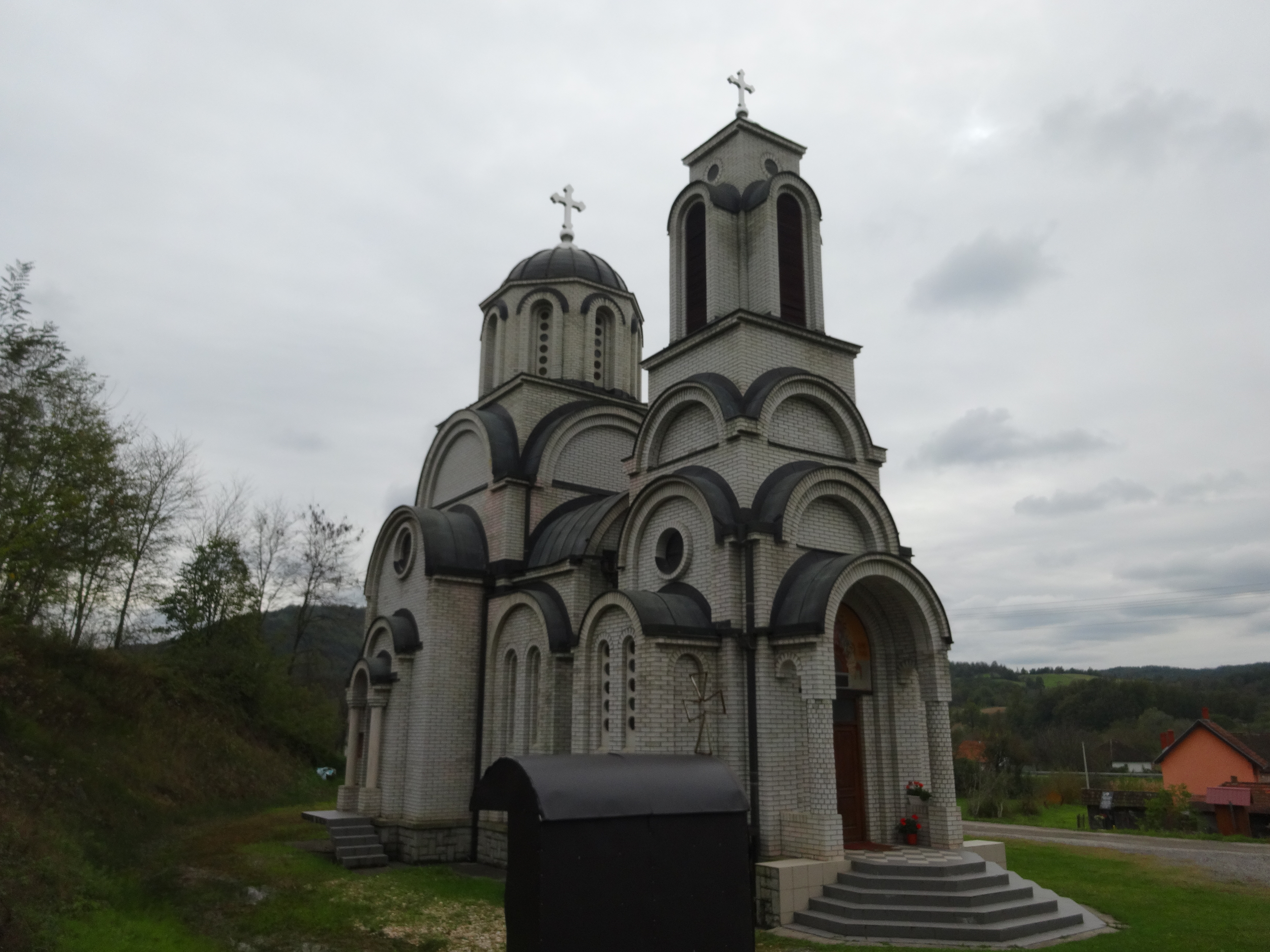
- Interactive map of Štavica
- Country: Serbia
- District: Kolubara District
- Municipality: Ljig
- Time zone: UTC+1 (CET)
  - Summer (DST): UTC+2 (CEST)

Štavica is a village situated in Ljig municipality in Serbia.

== Demography ==
In the village of Štavica, there are 351 adult people, and the average age of the population is 46.1 years (45.4 in males and 46.8 in females). There are 145 households in the settlement, and the average number of members per household is 2.94.

This settlement is largely inhabited by Serbs and in the last three censuses, there was a decrease in the number of inhabitants.
