= Poljanice (Ljig) =

Poljanice Пољанице
- Village (Selo)
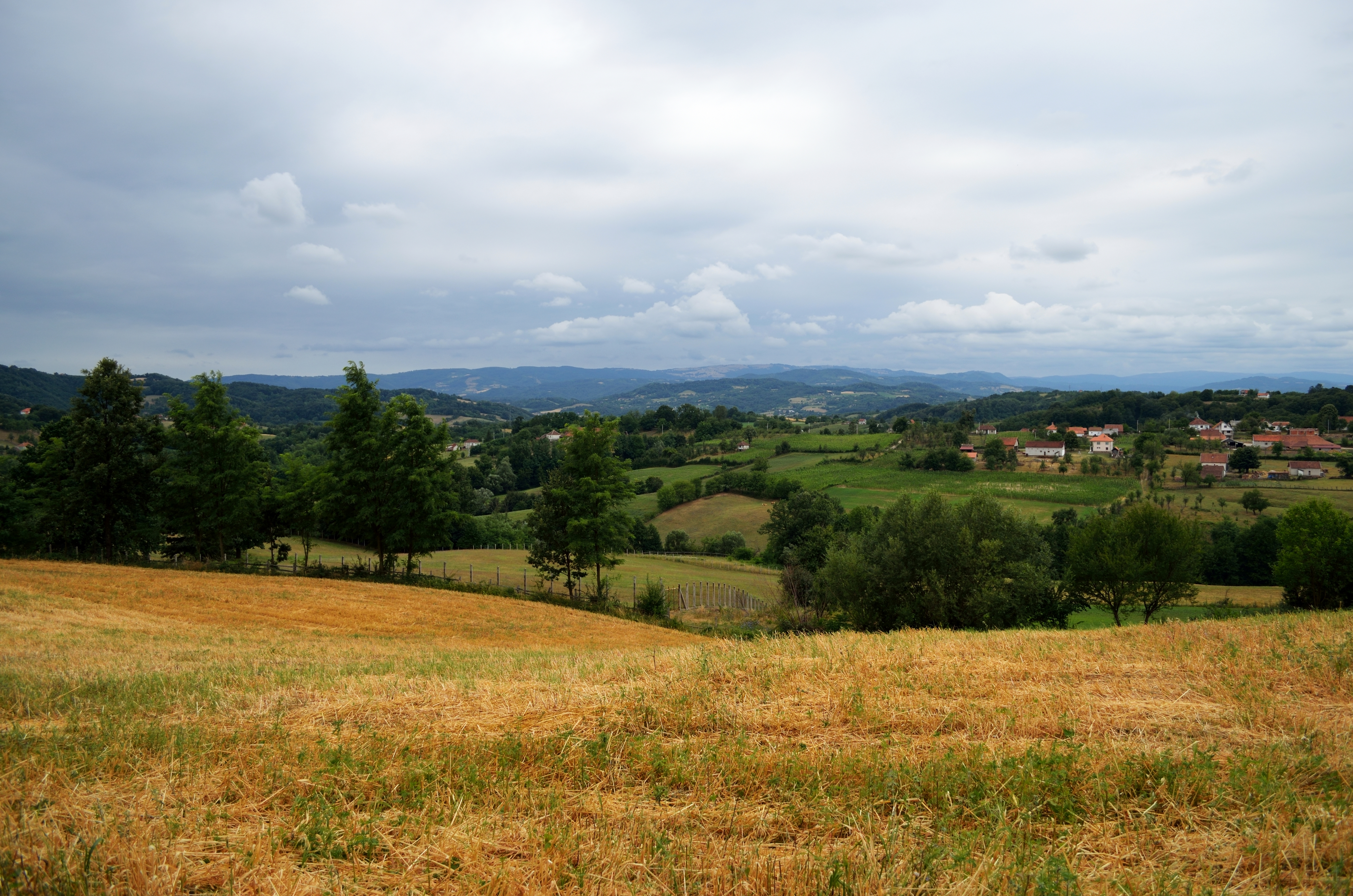

- Location within Serbia
- Coordinates: 44°14′05″N 20°20′01″E
- Country: Serbia
- District: Kolubara District
- Municipality: Ljig

Population (2011)
  - Total: 442
- Time zone: UTC+1 (CET)
  - Summer (DST): UTC+2 (CEST)

Poljanice (Serbian Cyrillic: Пољанице) is a village situated in Ljig municipality in Serbia.
