= Poljanice, Travnik =

Poljanice
- Village
- Location within Bosnia and Herzegovina
- Coordinates: 44.270°N 17.715°E
- Country: Bosnia and Herzegovina
- Entity: Federation of Bosnia and Herzegovina
- Canton: Central Bosnia
- Municipality: Travnik

Area
  - Total: 0.46 sq mi (1.19 km^{2})

Population (2013)
  - Total: 250
  - Density: 540/sq mi (210/km^{2})
- Time zone: UTC+1 (CET)
  - Summer (DST): UTC+2 (CEST)

Poljanice is a village in the municipality of Travnik, Bosnia and Herzegovina.

== Demographics ==
According to the 2013 census, its population was 250.

Ethnicity in 2013
Ethnicity	Number	Percentage
Bosniaks	247	98.8%
other/undeclared	3	1.2%
Total	250	100%
