= Rajac (mountain) =

Mountain in the country of Serbia

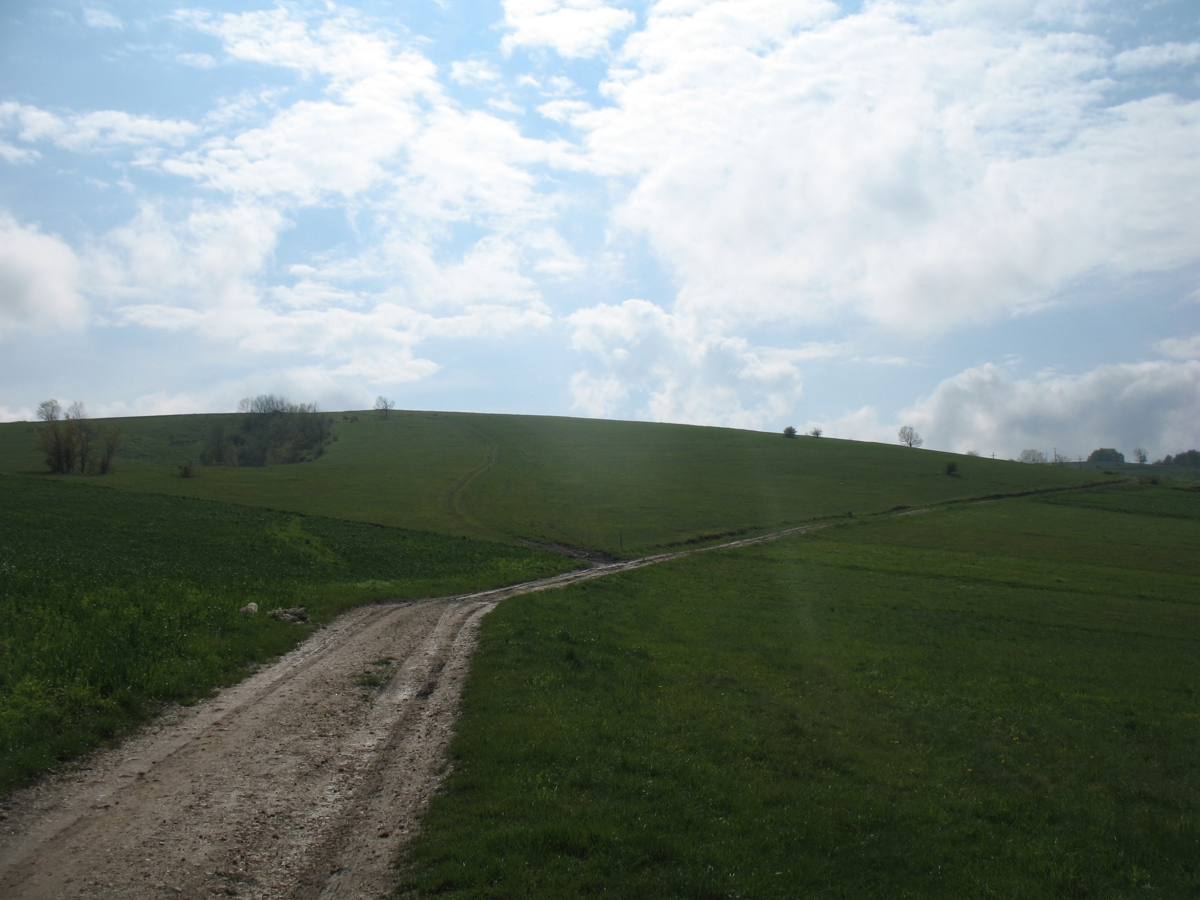

Highest point
- Elevation: 848 m (2,782 ft)
- Coordinates: 44°07′16″N 20°10′54″E

Geography
- Location within Serbia
- Location: Western Serbia
- Parent range: Dinaric Alps

Rajac (Serbian Cyrillic: Рајац) is a mountain in western Serbia. The summit of the mountain lies at 848 metres (2,782 ft).

The mountain is touristically the best developed and most accessible in the vicinity of Belgrade. On Rajac the battle of Kolubara was fought during World War I. Trenches dug by the Serbian army in November 1914 are still visible.

== Wildlife ==
The slopes of the mountain are covered by meadows, clearings and forest of beech, birch, ash, turkey oak, conifer, fir and pine. The meadows grow a large number of medicinal plants. The forests host pheasant, roe deer, fox, wild boar, hare and tortoise.

== Scythe festival ==
Every year in July there is a 3-day long traditional scythe festival. The main happening is competition in traditional grass cutting with scythe - scything. In a big field competitors are gathered in traditional folklore clothes where they perform their scything skills and when finished they are rated by jury. It is not only important to be the fastest one but the quality and technique is important to win as well. There are many concerts during the three days and there are also a lot of traditional folklore music in big tents (Šatra) with tables and food, mainly pork or lamb roast, but also sour cabbage. Live music is performed by many artists during these days.

== Rock climbing ==
Rajac is the first and only granite climbing crag in Serbia. Located in the village of Građenik, this old granite quarry was turned into a small climbing crag with 36 bolted routes in total, difficulties from 4b to 8a+.

== See also ==
- List of mountains in Serbia
