= Banja Vrujci =

Banja Vrujci Бања Врујци
- Village
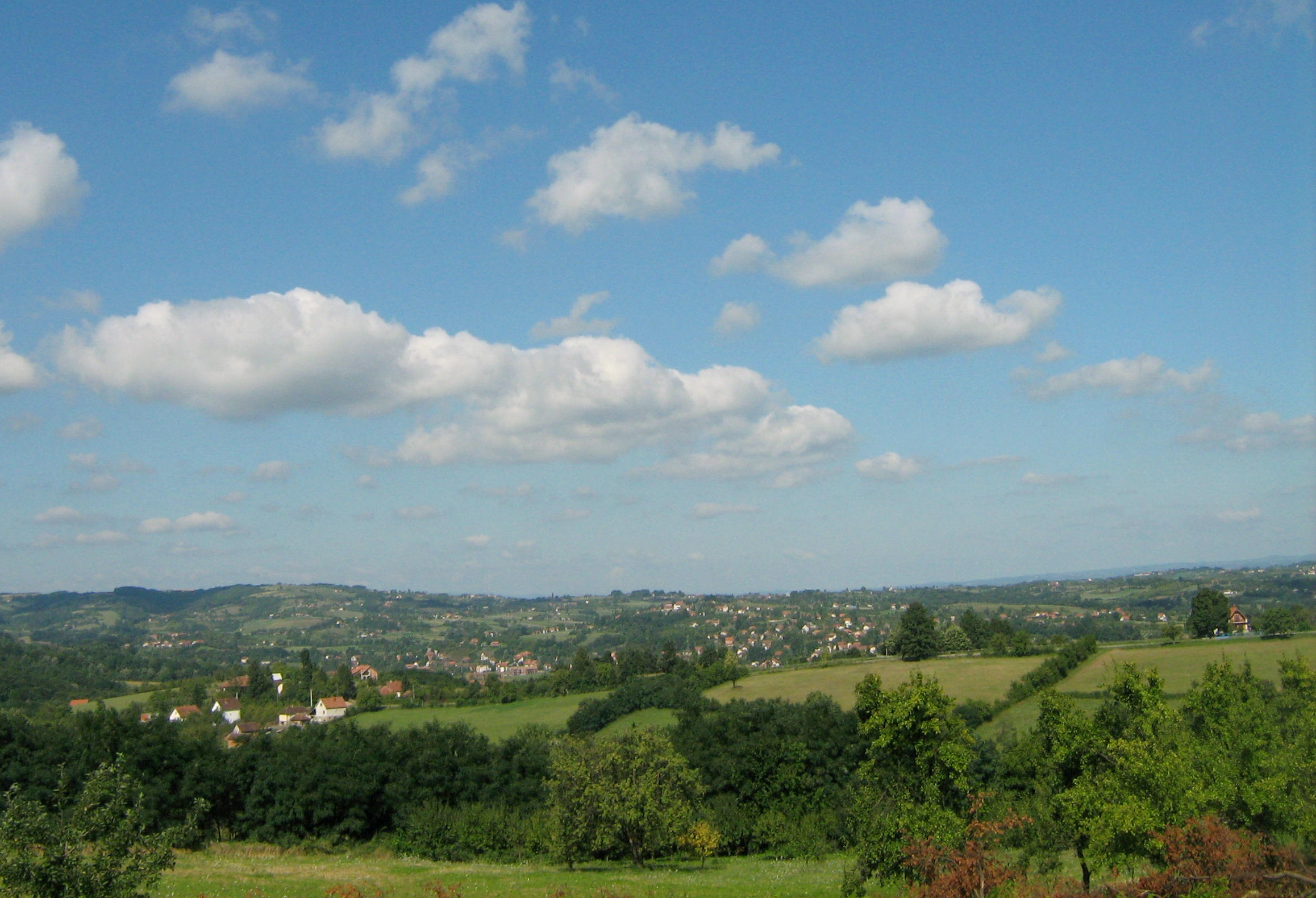

- Location within Serbia
- Coordinates: 44°13′N 20°9′E
- Country: Serbia
- Statistical region: Šumadija and Western Serbia
- District: Kolubara
- Municipality: Mionica

Banja Vrujci (Serbian Cyrillic: Бања Врујци) is a spa town located in the western part of Serbia, spread around the hillsides of Suvobor mountain and the River Toplica valley.

It is most famous for its healing water, which was commercialized during the 2000s. Branded as "Voda Voda", it is being sold in many countries worldwide, like Russia, Czech Republic, Singapore and Japan.

== History ==
The legend says that the national hero Milan Toplica had a palace there and that his name Toplica comes after the river Toplica The legend also says that Serbian soldiers during the First World War and especially after the Battle of Kolubara treated their wounds and cured themselves bathing in the River Toplica.

== Spa ==
The Vrujci Spa is located at the foot of the mountains Suvobor and Maljen, between Ljig and Mionica. It belongs to the Mionica municipality and the Kolubara District. The Vrujci Spa and its area are surrounded by picturesque hills and captivating scenery of pristine nature. The Toplica River runs through the spa the name of which speaks of the existence of hot thermal water in the Vrujci Spa. The temperature of the water that springs in the very centre of the spa is 26-27 °C, and it falls within the category of oligomineral waters. The water is used for therapeutic purposes both for bathing and drinking.

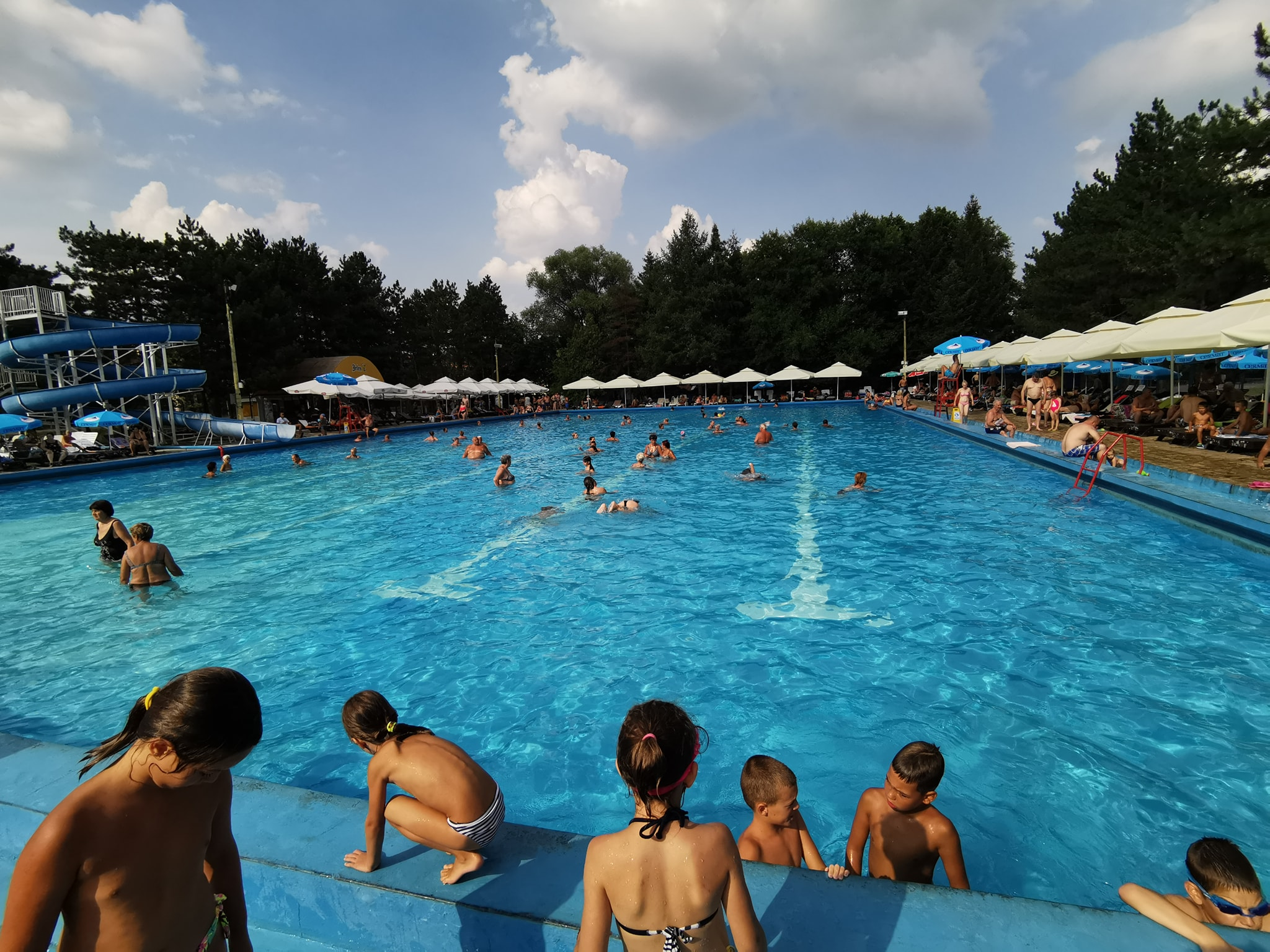
Hotel Vrujci swimming pools in summer 2019 in Vrujci spa

The therapeutic properties of the water and the spa mud are used for treating rheumatic ailments, sterility, sciatica, varicose veins, high blood pressure, skin diseases...

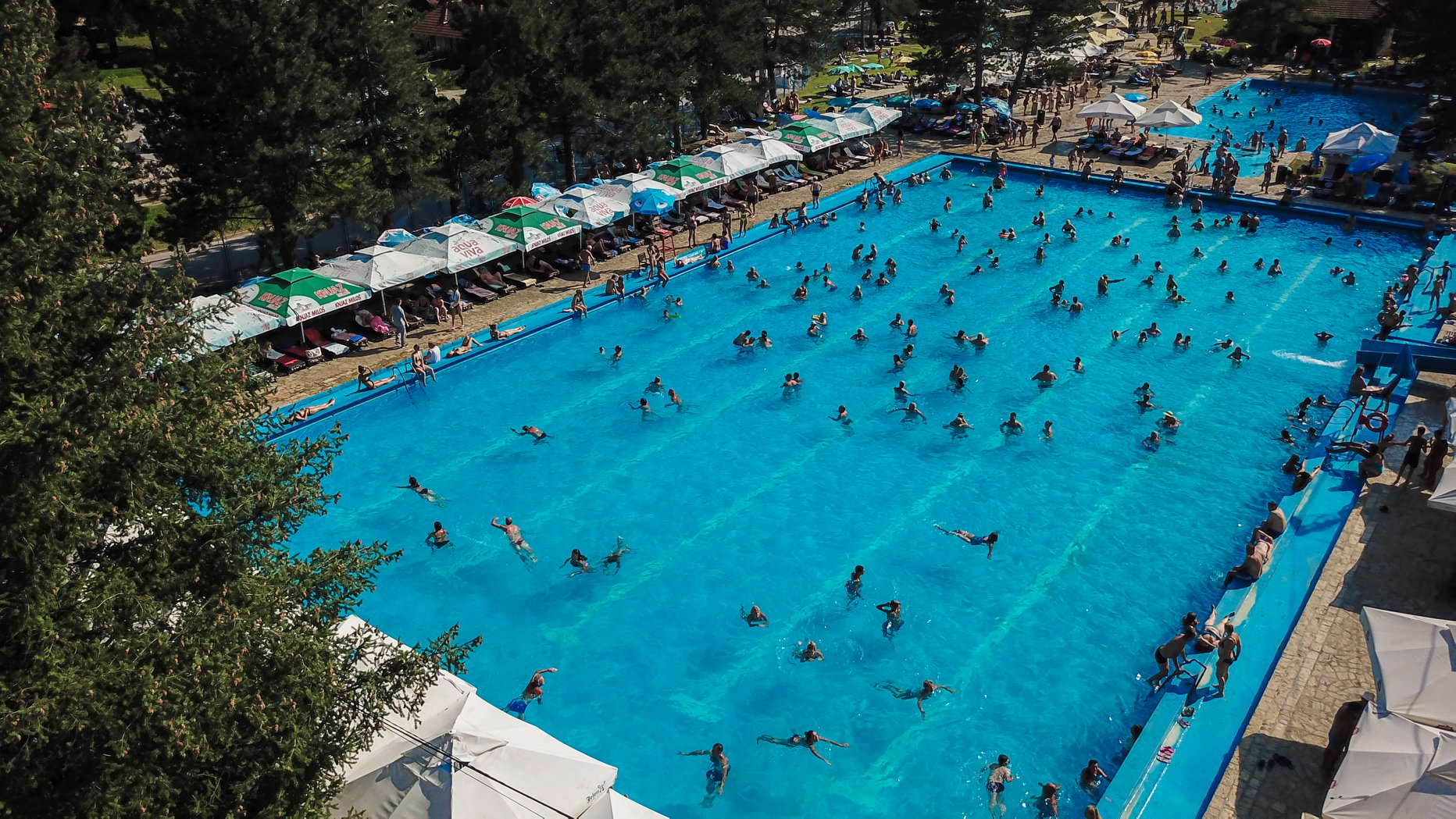
Banja Vrujci spa in Serbia - Pools that are filled with natural water with healing properties.

The Vrujci Spa has a complex of bathing pools that are unique in Serbia because they are built right on the thermal water springs, which makes them free flowing. In addition to providing treatment for the said medical conditions, the Vrujci Spa is an ideal choice for holiday, recreation, leisure, hiking, fishing, camping and a series of other activities.

It is located at 92 km from Belgrade, 113 km from Pančevo, 65 km from Obrenovac, 30 km from Valjevo, 62 km from Čačak, 170 km from Novi Sad.

== Surrounding area ==
- Struganik (5 km) – the birthplace of Duke Živojin Mišić (one of the Serbian Army commanders in World War I) – museum
- Ribnica (7 km) – the Ribnica River, the Ribnica Cave and St.Peter and Paul's Church
- Valjevo (Serbian Cyrillic: Ваљево, pronounced [ʋâːʎeʋo]) is a city and the administrative center of the Kolubara District in western Serbia.
- Paštrić (9 km) – is a village situated in Mionica municipality in Serbia
- Ravna Gora (29 km) – a monument of Draža Mihajlović (leader of the Chetnik movement in World War II)
- Bogovađa (23 km) – the Bogovađa Monastery
- Rajac (23 km) – Mt.Rajac, “Haymaking in Rajac“ an event taking place in mid July,
- Divčibare (15 km) – mountain holiday resort
- Mionica (10 km) - a town and municipality located in the Kolubara District
- Bogovađa Monastery (15 km) - Bogovadja Monastery with the church of St George
- Ćelije Monastery (33 km) - the founder of the church and the adjoining monastery buildings was bishop Nikolaj Velimirović
- Popadić is a village situated in Mionica municipality in Serbia.
- Berkovac (Serbian: Берковац) is a village situated at the north of the Mionica municipality, Kolubara District in Serbia.

== See also ==
- List of spa towns in Serbia

== Social Networks ==
- Banja Vrujci on Facebook Page
- Banja Vrujci on Facebook Group
- Banja Vrujci on Instagram
- Banja Vrujci on Youtube
- Banja Vrujci on X
- Banja Vrujci on Pinterest
- Banja Vrujci on Linkedin
- Banja Vrujci on Tik Tok
- Banja Vrujci on Threads
- Banja Vrujci on Google Map
- Banja Vrujci on Blogspot
- Banja Vrujci on Wordpress
- Banja Vrujci on About Me
