= Ivan's Tower =

Coordinates: 42°56′57″N 21°24′41″E

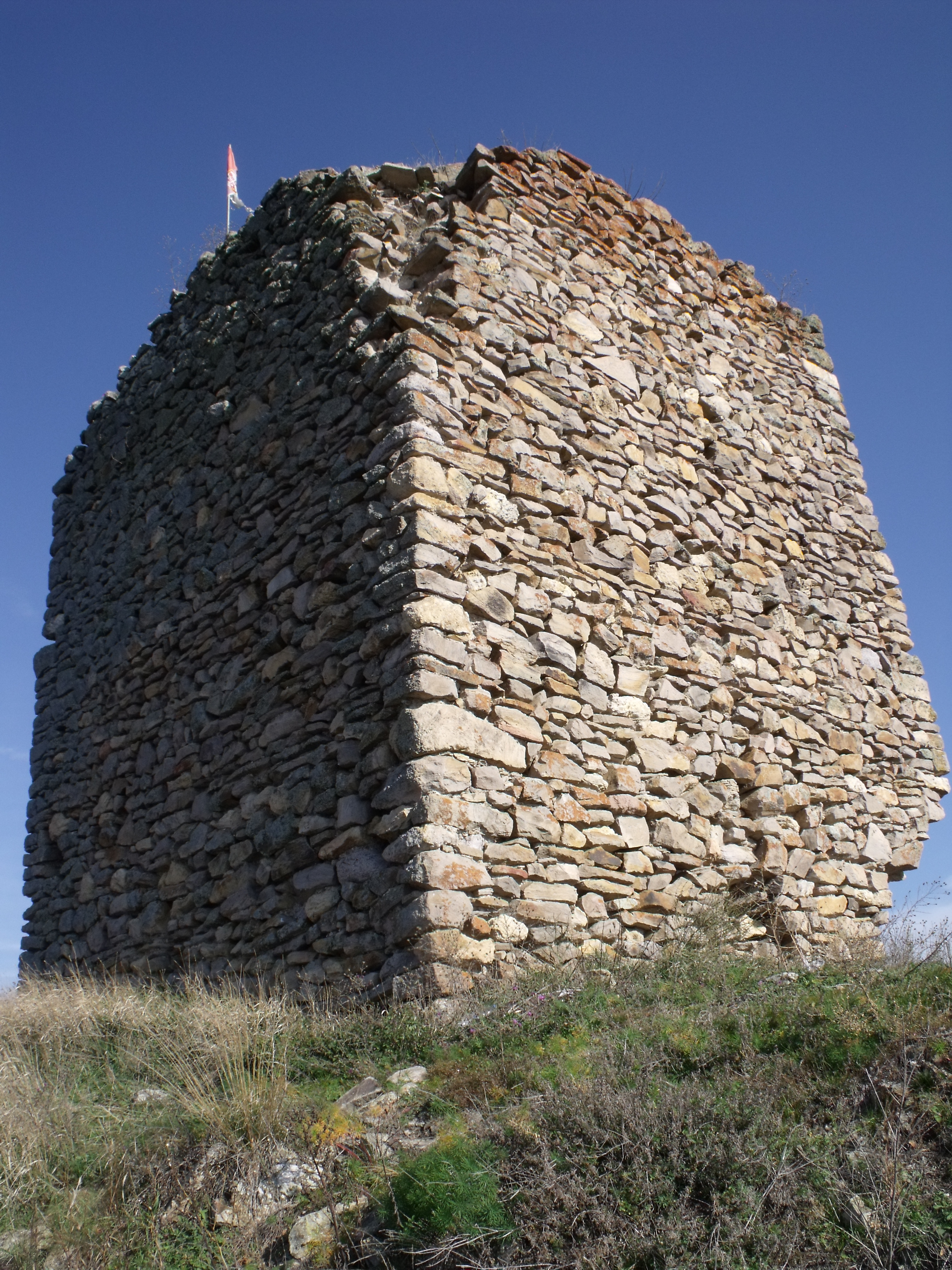
Ivan kula

Ivan's Tower (Serbian: Иван кула, Иванова кула, romanized: Ivan kula, Ivanova kula) is a medieval fortress located 33km south of the town Kuršumlija in Serbia, on the mountain Radan. The fort is located on a separate hill at 1076m near the village of Ivan Kula, at the southwest tip of Đak (1400 m). The fortress was built on top of the volcanic cone, which is flattened. The tower has a height of 14 m, the sides ca 7.78 and 5.80 m, standing on Roman foundations, with 1.34 m thick walls of rough-cut blocks hourglass. On the north side of the tower rests on a medieval church with my 56 degree, razed to the ground. On the south side are the remains of the young building.

After the Battle of Kosovo, the fortress came under the rule of Despot Stefan Lazarevic until 1412.

According to tradition, it was the fortress of legendary vitez ("knight") Ivan Kosančić of Serbian epic poetry.

== Sources ==
- Serbien — historisch-ethnographische Reisestudien (Serbia — Ethnographic and Historical Travel Studies)-Felix Philipp Kanitz. Leipzig (1868).
- Medieval cities in Serbia, Montenegro and southern Serbia - Aleksandar Deroko
