= Radan (mountain) =

Mountain in Serbia

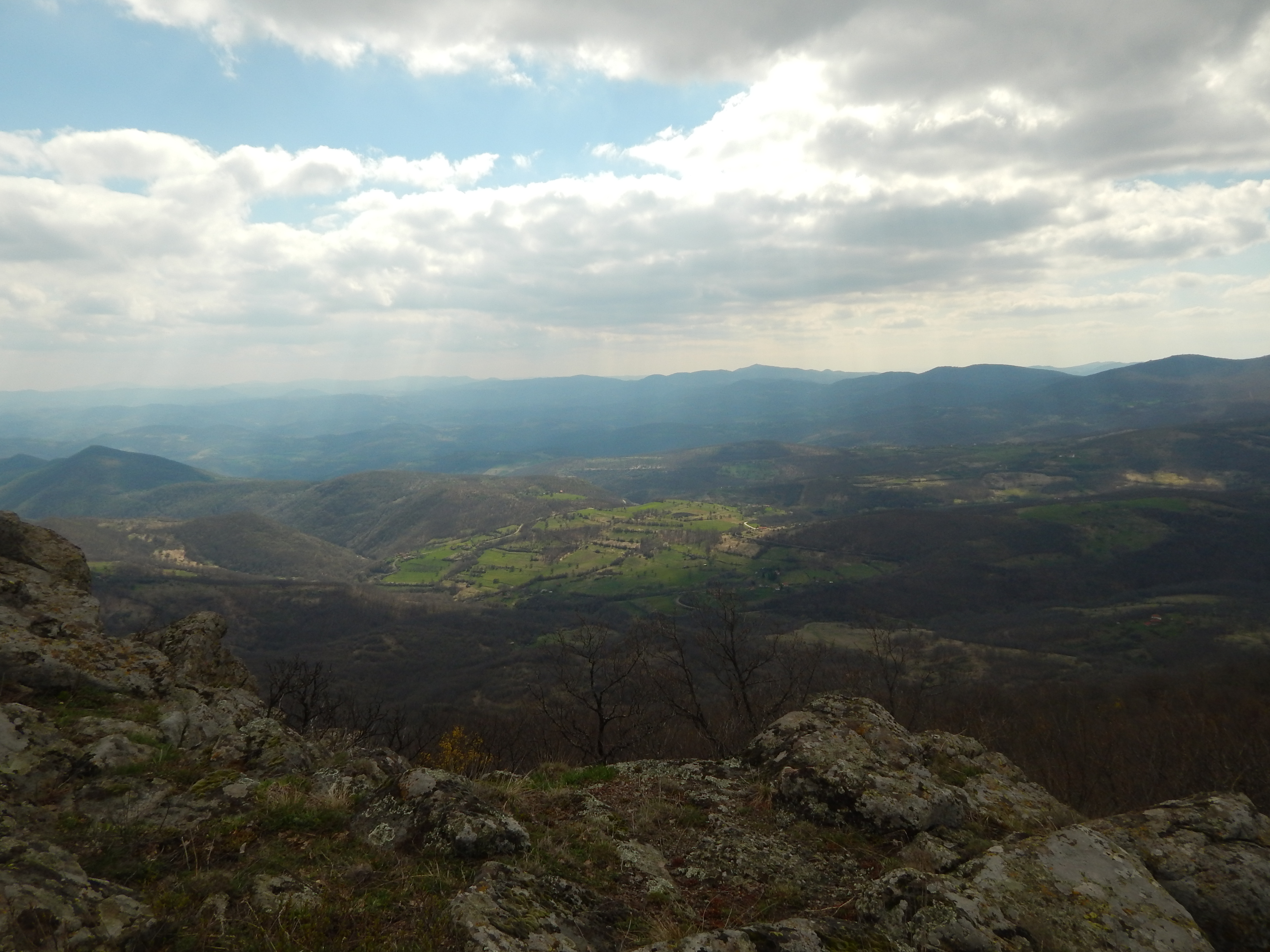

Highest point
- Elevation: 1,408 m (4,619 ft)
- Coordinates: 43°00′12″N 21°29′48″E

Geography
- Location within Serbia
- Location: Southern Serbia
- Parent range: Dinaric Alps

Radan (Serbian Cyrillic: Радан) is a mountain in southern Serbia, 33 km from the town of Kuršumlija. Its highest peak, Šopot, has an elevation of 1,408 meters above sea level.

== Geography ==
Radan separates the valleys of the Toplica and Jablanica rivers. It is well covered with deciduous and evergreen forests.

Radan's best known scenic spot is the Đavolja Varoš, a peculiar rock formation consisting of hundreds of mushroom-like posts, located on its southern slopes. Near the Devil's Town there are ruins of Ivanova kula – a fortification built on top of a volcanic coupe. Folk tradition connects the small tower keep located there to Ivan Kosančić, the medieval military commander. Justiniana Prima (Caričin grad), a Byzantine city from the 6th century, is located on the southeast of the mountain, near Lebane.

In 2010, Radan attracted media attention because of a "magnetic hill" located on a road near the village of Ivanje. After initial sensationalist articles about "anti-gravity", it soon turned out that it is just an optical illusion. Still, the hill is seen as an opportunity for a tourist attraction.

== Nature Park ==
In 2017, the government placed part of the mountain under protection, as the Radan Nature Park, citing its geological, biological and landscape diversity. It spans the area of four municipalities, Bojnik, Medveđa, Prokuplje and Kuršumlija, and covers an area of 41,312.66 ha (102,085.8 acres). Declared the "protected area of exceptional importance" (IUCN Category I), it is divided in three levels of protection, with the highest level occupying 1,077.52 ha (2,662.6 acres) or 2.6% of the total area. Though the best known feature on the mountain, the Devil's Town is not included in the newly formed nature park, though it was previously declared a geo-park on its own.

== See also ==
- List of mountains in Serbia
