= Vitez (Serbia) =

Medieval Serbian noble cavalry

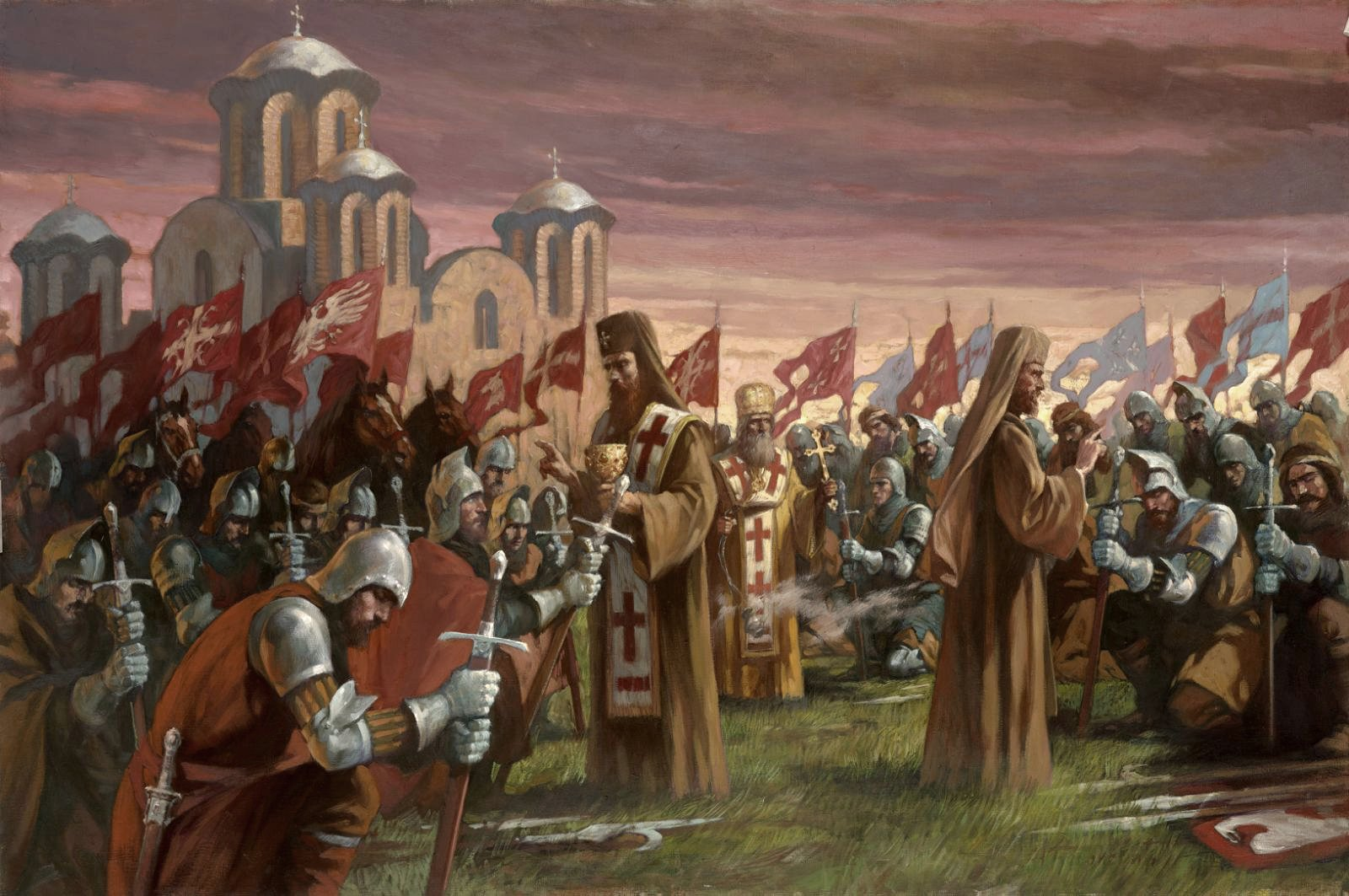
Communion outside Samodreža prior to the battle of Kosovo (1389), work by Nebojša Đuranović (b. 1968).

In medieval Serbian history, the vitez (Serbian: витез, pl. vitezovi/витезови, often translated as "knight") were mounted warriors, part of the nobility, that followed chivalric codes. They are especially known from Serbian epic poetry in events of the 14th–15th centuries, surrounding the Fall of the Serbian Empire and struggles against the expanding Ottoman Empire.

Serbia, an Orthodox and Byzantine-culture country in southeastern Europe, had also a similar feudal- and military organization as that of western Europe, which included the knight and chivalry. The term vitez is of Old Slavic origin. As historical sources on the medieval vitez are scarce, further information is found in Serbian epic poetry. While Serbia did not have knightly tournaments as in the west (and depicted in western cinema), the duel (mejdan/megdan), a characteristic theme in epic poetry, as well as games such as mace- or spear-throwing while jumping or from a horse, target shooting, wrestling, etc. are known. The emperor Stefan Dušan (r. 1331–1355) was an enthusiast of knightly traditions, and was remembered in the Republic of Ragusa as a frequent arranger of knightly duels and tournaments. Oftenly, in epic poetry, the vitez is measured by the looks, strength and abilities of his horse. Heroism and war skills were the most valued traits of the vitez. An oath (zakletva, viteška reč) was an unwritten law, and non-compliance with the given word (which meant disloyalty) was considered treason.

The Serbian heavy cavalry was the most powerful of the troops, as in other European medieval armies, with the main task of assault. Serbian monarchs on horseback in full knightly armor are depicted in seals since the first half of the 13th century, from Stefan Vladislav (r. 1234–1243) onward. The participation of heavy cavalry can be followed more closely from king Stefan Dečanski (r. 1322–1331) and emperor Stefan Dušan (r. 1331–1355). The Serbian heavy cavalry was made up of mostly vlasteličići (lesser nobility), and they were equipped and armed by the ruler. Apart from Serbian heavy cavalry, there were mercenary units, such as that of knight Palman, who served in Serbia for over twenty years, and commanded a 300-strong mercenary heavy cavalry unit. The 58th article of Dušan's Code decided that a fallen nobleman's "good horse and weapons" be returned to the emperor, but his knightly belt and clothing stay in the family. Equipment for the heavy cavalry included helmets such as barbuta, basinet, and great helm; Dušan ordered hundreds of barbuta-type helmets from Venice and his close followers wore great helms. The great helm is depicted on the coat of arms of the Nemanjić dynasty, coins of the Serbian emperors and other objects, and heraldry of Dušan's nobility. The sword known as spada schiavonesca was a knightly sword used in the Serbian army, known in sources from the late 14th-century.

The heavy cavalry (and knights) participated in the Battle of Kosovo (1389), the biggest battle between Christians and the Ottomans since the latter's arrival on European soil. Apart from its military and political importance, the battle had a religious dimension, in which the Ottomans fought jihad against unbelievers, and the Serbs defended their lands from unbelievers. The battle gave birth to the Kosovo Myth. In Serbian epic poetry, the Kosovo Cycle (Kosovski ciklus) surrounds the battle, and various vitezovi are main characters, such as Miloš Obilić, the Jugović brothers, Pavle Orlović, Milan Toplica and Ivan Kosančić.

Despot Stefan Lazarević was a Serbian ruler and also a Western knight, as member of the Order of the Dragon (1408). As the son of Lazar of Serbia, who fell heroically at the Battle of Kosovo (1389) and rose to mythological proportions, Stefan received larger-than-life status among the church, nobility and common people, when he was still alive. Despot Stefan had knights in his ranks that participated in western tournaments, of which one, according to Konstantin Filozof, won the 1411 tournament in Hungary.

== Legacy ==
The epithet "Serb knights" (Serbian: српски витезови) was widespread in the 19th- and 20th-century as a poetic honorific for the armies, soldiers and rebels that fought against the Ottoman Empire. It was used by Montenegrin metropolitan and poet Njegoš (t. 1830–1851) to call on the former glory of Serb history and fight against the Ottoman Empire. It was given to the Serbian Revolutionaries (1804–1815), by Mirko Petrović-Njegoš for the Montenegrin army fighting at Grahovac (1858), Herzegovinian rebels (1875–1877), and in more recent times, the 63rd Parachute Brigade.

There are "knightly festivals" (Serbian: витешки фестивал) held in Serbia, such as the Just Out festival.

== See also ==
- Medieval Serbian army
- Cataphract, type of heavy cavalry
- Bogatyr, stock character in East Slavic epic poetry
- Hussar, light cavalry in Hungary and Poland
- Deli, light cavalry in the Ottoman Empire

== Sources ==
- Aleksić, Marko (2016). Српски витешки код [Serb Knightly Code]. Лагуна. ISBN 978-86-521-2453-4.
- Aleksić, Marko (2015). "Реформа српске војске у време Стефана Душана". Vojnoistorijski glasnik. 2: 9–32 – via CEEOL.
- Aleksić, Marko (2023). "Војни и историјски аспекти Косовске битке". Косовски завјет: историја и култура памћења у Републици Српској (PDF).
- Petrović, Nebojša (2012). "VITEŠTVO I DESPOT STEFAN LAZAREVIĆ". Viteška Kultura. 1 (1): 23–36 – via Academia.edu.
- Popović-Radović, Мirjana (1989). Српски витешки кодекс-јунака косовског предања. Narodna knjiga. ISBN 978-86-331-0199-8.
