= Ivan Kosančić =

Serbian legendary knight

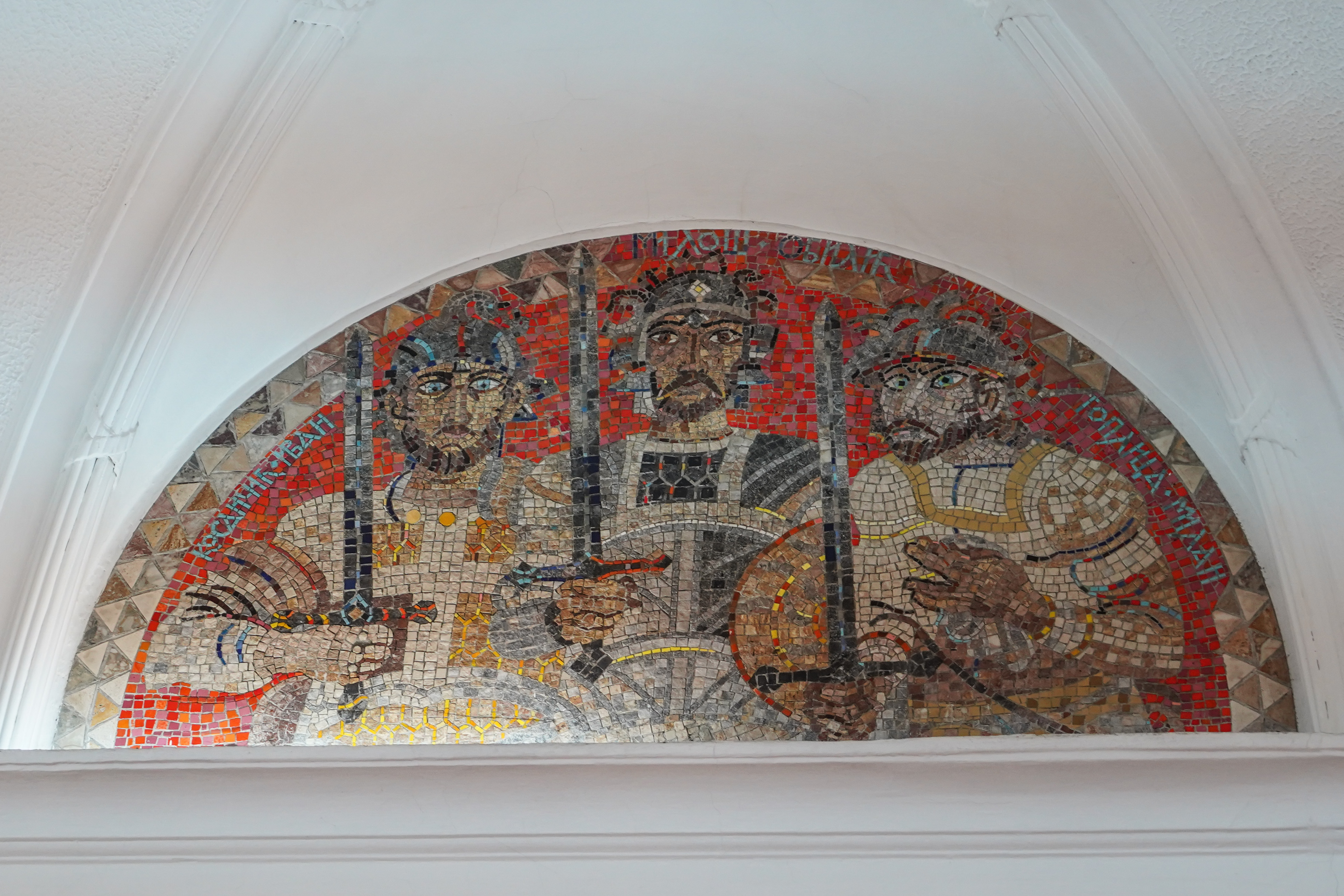
Mosaic of Kosančić Ivan, Miloš Obilić and Toplica Milan.

Ivan Kosančić (Serbian Cyrillic: Иван Косанчић) is a legendary Serbian vitez ("knight") who fell at the historical Battle of Kosovo in 1389, popular in the Kosovo Cycle of Serbian epic poetry.

== Overview ==
In Serbian epic poetry, Ivan Kosančić is part of a triad of heroes, along with Miloš Obilić and Milan Toplica, three sworn brothers (pobratim). V. Čajkanović believed the number of three sworn brothers, and not two (as is characteristic of myths and epic) originated from folk stories, and that Ivan Kosančić and Toplica Milan are doubles of one mythic character. Another popular trio is that of Marko, Miloš and Relja, where the latter two are mostly equals, below and following Marko. Maretić treated Ivan and Milan as non-historical figures that derived their names from the rivers Kosanica and Toplica. Ivan and Milan are most often paired in the poems.

== Stories ==
Ivan Kosančić (also called Ivan Kosovčić) was born in the upper Toplica region (in south Serbia), by the mountain of Radan near the town of Kuršumlija. He was a sworn brother (pobratim) to Miloš Obilić and Milan Toplica.

Some narratives, particularly the epic ballad Kosovo Maiden, where the eponymous maiden is betrothed to Milan Toplica and Kosančić is supposed to serve as a groomsman (đever) at their wedding that never came to be, strongly suggest that Kosančić and Toplica might actually be siblings. Another strong hint comes from the fact that both of the heroes come from the Toplica region, with Milan taking his surname after it, whereas Ivan takes it after Kosanica river that flows through the area. In some older Ragusan chronicles, corresponding with local folklore in Herzegovina and north Montenegro, these two characters are merged into one, sometimes confusingly named Ivan Milan, while another character of Nikola Kosovčić is added. Variously portrayed either as Miloš's faithful servants, or more commonly, his blood brothers, these characters are often depicted as people of the same kin, most commonly under the same surname Kosovčić. Nevertheless, they were all developed from the same historical source, the 12 unnamed noblemen who managed to kill the Ottoman sultan Murad I at Kosovo.

Kosančić is presented in Serbian epic poetry as a spymaster, most notably in Vuk Karadžić's partially documented Kosančić Ivan spies on the Turks, which broadly outlines his general features. Presented in the form of dialogue between Miloš Obilić and Ivan Kosančić after the latter returns from his mission, Kosančić here is given as a strict, reliable and trustworthy character. Firmly with his feet on the ground, he intends on properly informing Prince Lazar Hrebeljanović about the actual shape and size of the mighty Ottoman army. Miloš, on the other hand, tries to persuade him into adjusting his report in order to present the enemy as vast in number while short on skill and secretly ill, fearing that the matter at hand might deliver a striking blow to the morale of their own forces. Later, at the Prince's supper he is seen seated next to Obilić and Toplica, where prince Lazar salutes him as the most handsome in the army. The trio then feigns surrender to the Turks, with a scene where Kosančić always remains in front of Murad's tent to watch after their horses (his own mythical stallion is named Zekan). Ultimately, he falls right after Milan Toplica in their failed attempt to flee, with Miloš being the last to succumb or otherwise ends up being captured and ceremonially executed by the enemy. The scene of the flight is decorated with the narrative gradation where every one of them leaves a unique mark in the enemy lines: Where Toplica passes, a chariot can follow; where Kosančić passes, two chariots can follow; whereas where Obilić passes, three chariots can follow.

== Legacy ==
According to tradition, the fortress of Kosančić was the Ivan's Tower located on the western slopes of mount Radan.

The Belgrade urban neighbourhood of Kosančićev Venac was named after him.

In the movie Boj na Kosovu (1989), Ivan Kosančić is played by Milan Gutović.

== Sources ==
- Petković, Danijela (2014), "Тријаде у српској епици" (PDF), ПРОМИШЉАЊА ТРАДИЦИЈЕ, ИНСТИТУТ ЗА КЊИЖЕВНОСТ И УМЕТНОСТ, pp. 191-
- Маретић, Томо (1989), Косовски јунаци и догађаји у народној епици књ. XCVII
- Сувајџић, Бошко (2019), Косовска легенда: Семинар српског језика књижевности и културе, Међународни славистички центар Београд, pp. 57–78
