= Stevo Vasojević =

Stevo Vasojević or Vasojević Stevo (Serbian Cyrillic: Васојевић Стево), is a character in the Kosovo Cycle of Serbian epic poetry and a legendary ancestor of the Vasojevići tribe, the largest tribe in the Montenegrin Highlands. According to the epics (such as Pogibija Pavla Orlovića i Steva Vasojevića na Kosovu), he was a nobleman who fought and died at the Battle of Kosovo (1389).

It is known that Stefan Konstantin had a son, Stefan Vasoje (or Vaso), and it is claimed that he was the father of Stevo Vasojević. According to the story the Vasojevići are descendants of a Vaso (the eponymous founder), who was born in Prizren and served as a vojvoda (general) during the reign of Emperor Stefan Dušan (r. 1331–1355). His son, Vasojević Stevo, was a Vojvoda in Sjenica, with his court in the Dubnica village. Legends from the Montenegrin Highlands have it that Stevo was a Best man on the wedding of Miloš Obilić, a famed Serbian knight who slaughtered Sultan Murad in the Kosovo Battle, while the legends of West Serbia attribute him with bearing that honour on the wedding of Milan Toplica, another famed knight. He is mentioned in epic poems about the Battle of Kosovo from the Polimlje region and is usually depicted in the role of "Late knight" stock character who didn't participate in the battle itself, but rather under the heavy moral burden of the Kosovo curse, engaged the Ottoman occyping forces in Kosovo after the battle and died a heroic death. This particular plot is often used as a theme in Serbian epic poetry, only differing in the name of the characters, thus leading to the confusion of Stevo Vasojević with the historical Stefan Musić, a nephew of Prince Lazar, who is also a "Late knight" protagonist as Musić Stevan in the poetical interpretations of this theme in the region of North Kosovo, where historical Musić had his feudal estates. Although the song version about Musić Stefan is today generally better known and more popular, the song and legends about Vasojević Stevo are historically older. After the battle and Stevo's death, his descendants, the Vasojevići, as uskoks turned for Herzegovina and came to Foča, and from there turned to the south, southeast and east, and across Montenegro arrived at Nožice in Lijeva Rijeka, where they settled.
