= Katzbalger =

European arming sword

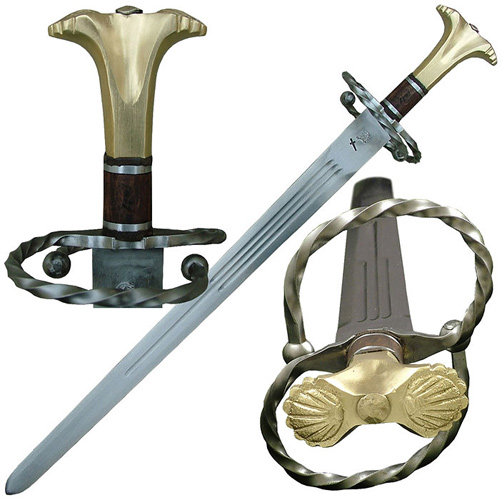
- Type: Arming sword
- Place of origin: Holy Roman Empire

Service history
- In service: 16th – 17th century
- Used by: Landsknechte and others
- Wars: Habsburg–Valois Wars, European wars of Religion

Specifications
- Mass: 0.8–1.5 kg (1.8–3.3 lb)
- Length: 70–80 cm (28–31 in)
- Blade type: Straight, broad, flat
- Hilt type: S-shaped guard

A Katzbalger (German: [ˈkat͡sbalɡɐ]) is a short arming sword, used in early modern Europe, notable for its sturdy build and a distinctive S-shaped or figure-8 shaped guard. Measuring 70–80 cm (28–31 in) long and weighing 0.8–1.5 kg (1.8–3.3 lb), it was the signature blade of the Landsknecht.

== Overview ==
The katzbalger is a side-arm, often used by pikemen, archers, and crossbowmen as a last resort if the enemy were to draw too close for bows or pikes to be effective.

Mostly a cutting sword, the rounded tips on many examples are ill-suited to thrusting, while the flat, broad blades are specialized for cutting. As with other similar cutting-centric arming swords, it can still be used for thrusting, though it is only likely to do damage to unarmored targets.

As with many sword varieties, variations exist within the type and katzbalger-style hilts can be found paired with slimmer and more thrust-oriented blades.

The large, characteristic guard helps to block and parry other cutting attacks. However, its openings leave the hands vulnerable to thrusting attacks.

== Terminology ==
There are several different explanations about the origin of the name Katzbalger: one is that it comes from the custom of carrying a sword without a scabbard, held only by a cat's skin (the German word Katze means "cat", while Balg means the skin (fur) of an animal). Whether such a custom actually existed is disputed.

Another theory is that the word derives from balgen (brawling), and refers to intense, close-quarter combat like fights between feral cats. The most common translation is "cat-gutter", with an allusion to cat fight.

== See also ==
- Schiavonesca, longsword with S-shaped crossguard
- Types of swords
