= Milan Toplica =

Serbian legendary knight

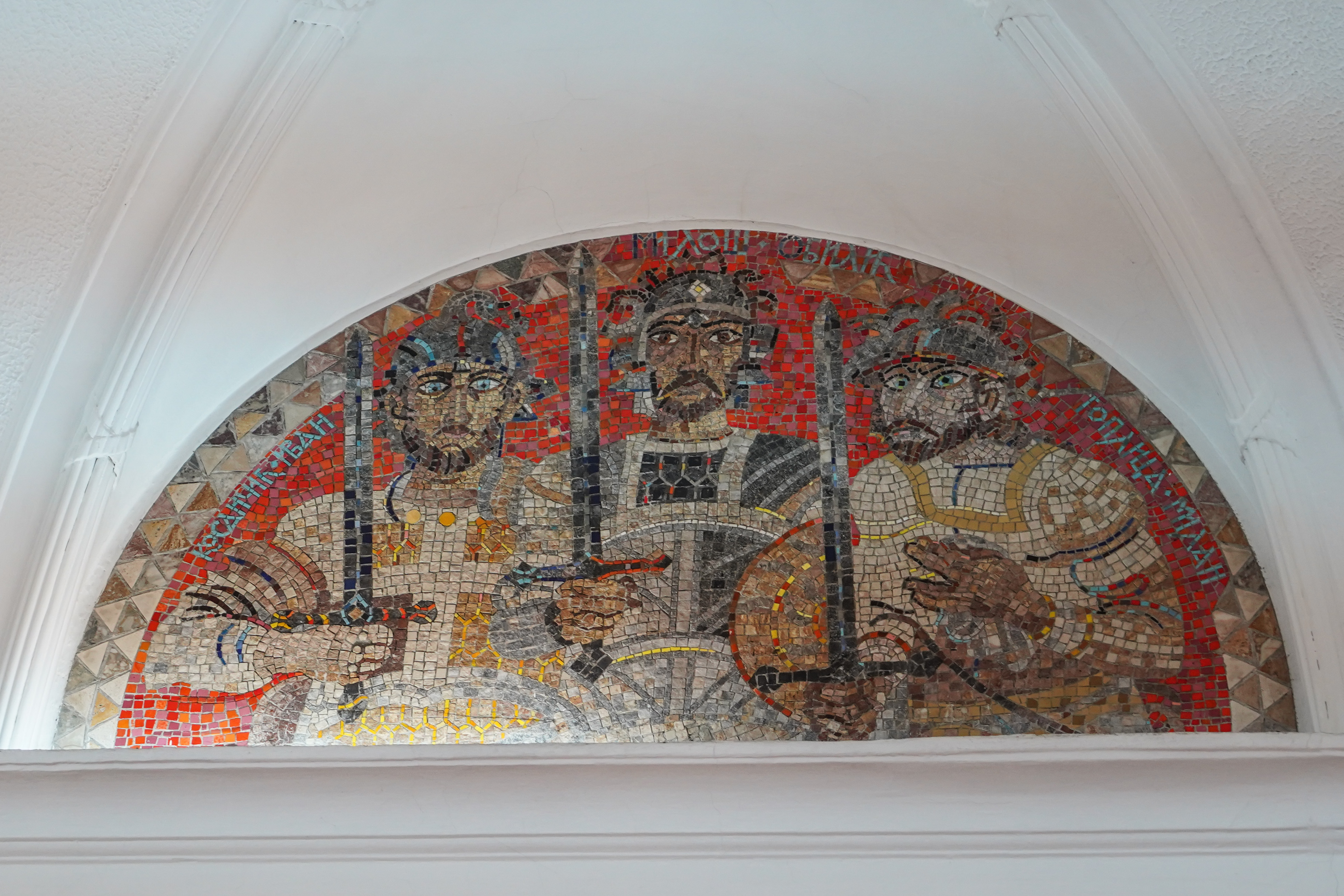
Mosaic of Kosančić Ivan, Miloš Obilić and Toplica Milan.

Toplica Milan (Serbian Cyrillic: Топлица Милан) or Milan Toplica (Serbian Cyrillic: Милан Топлица), also known as Milan from Toplica (Serbian: Милан из Топлице, romanized: Milan iz Toplice), was a legendary Serbian vitez ("knight") who was allied to Prince Lazar and died during the historical 1389 Battle of Kosovo, according to Serbian epic poems.

== Serbian tradition ==
A fictitious character from the Kosovo Myth, he is described in Serbian epic poetry as a knight born in the Toplica region, a sworn brother (Serbian: побратим, romanized: pobratim) to Miloš Obilić and Ivan Kosančić, and promised to a girl known as the Kosovo Maiden. After the Battle of Kosovo, the latter discovered Milan's death when she found Pavle Orlović, who told her the fate of Milan and his sworn brothers during the battle, according to a Serbian epic poem recorded and published in the early 19th century by Vuk Karadžić. The honours and titles attributed to him differ from area to area, with folk songs recorded by Karadžić referring to him as a duke. In the cycle of Marko Kraljević, he is known as a bajraktar, while Obilić appears as a voivode and Kosančić as a privenac (e.g. a support). In folk traditions, the character is usually portrayed as an expert marksman and the most skilled archer in the army of Prince Lazar, thus he is often visually depicted as carrying a bow and arrows. He is also often characterised as being exceptionally tall. Milan Toplica's legend is modeled after the historical group of 12 unnamed Christian knights who penetrated the Turkish camp and killed the Ottoman sultan Murad during the Battle of Kosovo, on 28 June 1389 (15 June 1389 on the calendar used at that Some legends depict him as a knight who entered Murad's tent along with Obilić, thus participating in the slaughter of the sultan's suite, under the shock of the assassination. Other legends portray him as standing guard outside the tent in the company of Kosančić. The epic poems says that in the aftermath, the trio attempts to escape in vain, wreaking havoc among the Turkish forces in the process. Toplica is described as so mighty that along the path where he forces his way, ...a chariot can pass afterwards. However, he is the first of the three to fall to the enemy blades.

== Legacy ==
Medieval Berkovac, near Valjevo, is commonly called Zamak Toplice Milana (Serbian Cyrillic: Замак Топлице Милана).

The Topličin venac street in Belgrade is named after Milan Toplica.

== See also ==
- General Vuča
- Jugović brothers
- Stevo Vasojević
