= Schiavonesca =

14th-16th century Eastern European swords

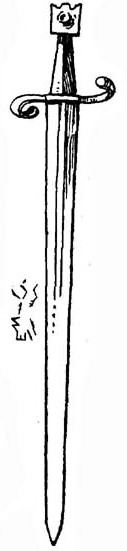
- Drawing of 15th-century specimen found in Italy.
- Type: Longsword
- Place of origin: Serbia, Hungary, Venice

Service history
- In service: c. 1400–1600

Production history
- Designed: Late 14th century
- Produced: c. 1400–1550

Specifications
- Mass: 1,5–2 kg
- Length: 95–130 cm
- Blade type: Double-edged
- Hilt type: S-shaped crossguard and square pommel

Schiavonesca (in Italian: spada schiavonesca, "Slavic sword") was a type of longsword characterized by an S-shaped crossguard and a square pommel, whose earliest specimens were found in late 14th-century Serbia. It was used by knights in the Kingdom of Hungary and Republic of Venice during the 15th and 16th centuries.

The oldest mention of the sword is found in the will of blacksmith Dobrič Bunisalić (fl. 1385–1391) dating to 1391, held at the Ragusan Archives: "...doe spade schiavonesche..." The term Sclavonia was the common Ragusan name for Serbia, its long-time neighbour, while the term Schiavone likely signified the general Slavic populace of Dalmatia and the Balkans (the Balkan Slavs) by the time production began in Venice.

The oldest specimens are estimated to date to the last decades of the 14th century, a period when Serbia was in constant conflict with the Ottoman Empire. It is also believed that this S-shaped sword hilt was popularized at this time. The S-shaped hilt was meant to protect from the Ottoman sabres (kilij). The Ottoman expansion and conquests saw north- and westward migrations of Serbs, initially within the Serbian state (the Serbian Despotate) and then to the neighbouring Hungary and Venetian Dalmatia. In Hungary, the Serb population was very active in defending the southern border against the Ottomans. It is for this reason, as well as other historical connections, that it has been assumed that the sword originated in the territory of Serbia. This type of sword spread mainly in Central and Southeastern Europe in the second half of the 15th century. The production of this type in Hungary and Venice saw it become more typologically uniform. Hungarian studies have confirmed that the sword was made up until the mid-16th century.

It was depicted in a fresco by Luca Signorelli painted between 1499–1502 at the Orvieto Cathedral. There are hundreds of specimen held at the Venetian Arsenal.

== See also ==
- Schiavona, Venetian basket-hilted sword
- Katzbalger, arming sword

== Sources ==
- Aleksić, Marko (2007). Mediaeval Swords from Southeastern Europe: Material from 12th to 15th Century. Belgrade: Dedraplast – via Academia.edu.
- Aleksić, Marko (2011). "Some Types of Hilts of Medieval Swords from Southeastern Europe". Cum Arma per Aeva. Łódź. pp. 155–172 – via Academia.edu.
- Fonseca, Cosimo Damiano (1979). Le aree omogenee della civiltà rupestre nell'ambito dell'impero bizantino - la Serbia: atti del quarto convegno internazionale di studio sulla civiltà rupestre medioevale nel mezzogiorno d'Italia. Congedo. pp. 97–98. ISBN 978-88-7786-122-1.
- Márk, Haramza (2024). "S-Keresztvasú Fegyverek Mohács Térségéből" [Weapons with S-Shaped Crossguard from the Vicinity of Mohács]. Temetetlen Mohács Az 1526. És Az 1687. Évi Csata Új Kutatási Eredményei [Unburied Mohács. New Research Results on the Battles of 1526 and 1687] – via Academia.edu.
- Németh, András K. (August 2026). "S-keresztvassal ellátott kard a középkori Páriból". WOMM.
- Oakeshott, Ewart (1994). The Sword in the Age of Chivalry. Boydell Press, Woodbridge. ISBN 9780851157153.
- Petrović, Đurđica (1976). Dubrovačko oružje u XIV veku. Posebna izdanja, knj. V. Beograd: Vojni muzej u Beogradu.
- Williams, Alan; Lazar, Tomaz (2020). "A group of medieval swords from the National Museum of Slovenia - metallographic analyses and hardness testing" (PDF). Acta Militaria Mediaevalia. Acta Militaria Mediaevalia.
- Vračar, Janko; Pandžić, Ivana (2020). "The Vrbas sword in stone. The story of Banja Lukas' excalibur". Museum of Republika Srpska – via ResearchGate.
