= Paštrić =

Coordinates: 44.2294°N 20.1003°E

- Village (Selo)
- Interactive map of Paštrić
- Country: Serbia
- District: Kolubara District
- Municipality: Mionica
- Time zone: UTC+1 (CET)
  - Summer (DST): UTC+2 (CEST)

Paštrić is a village situated in the Mionica municipality of Serbia.

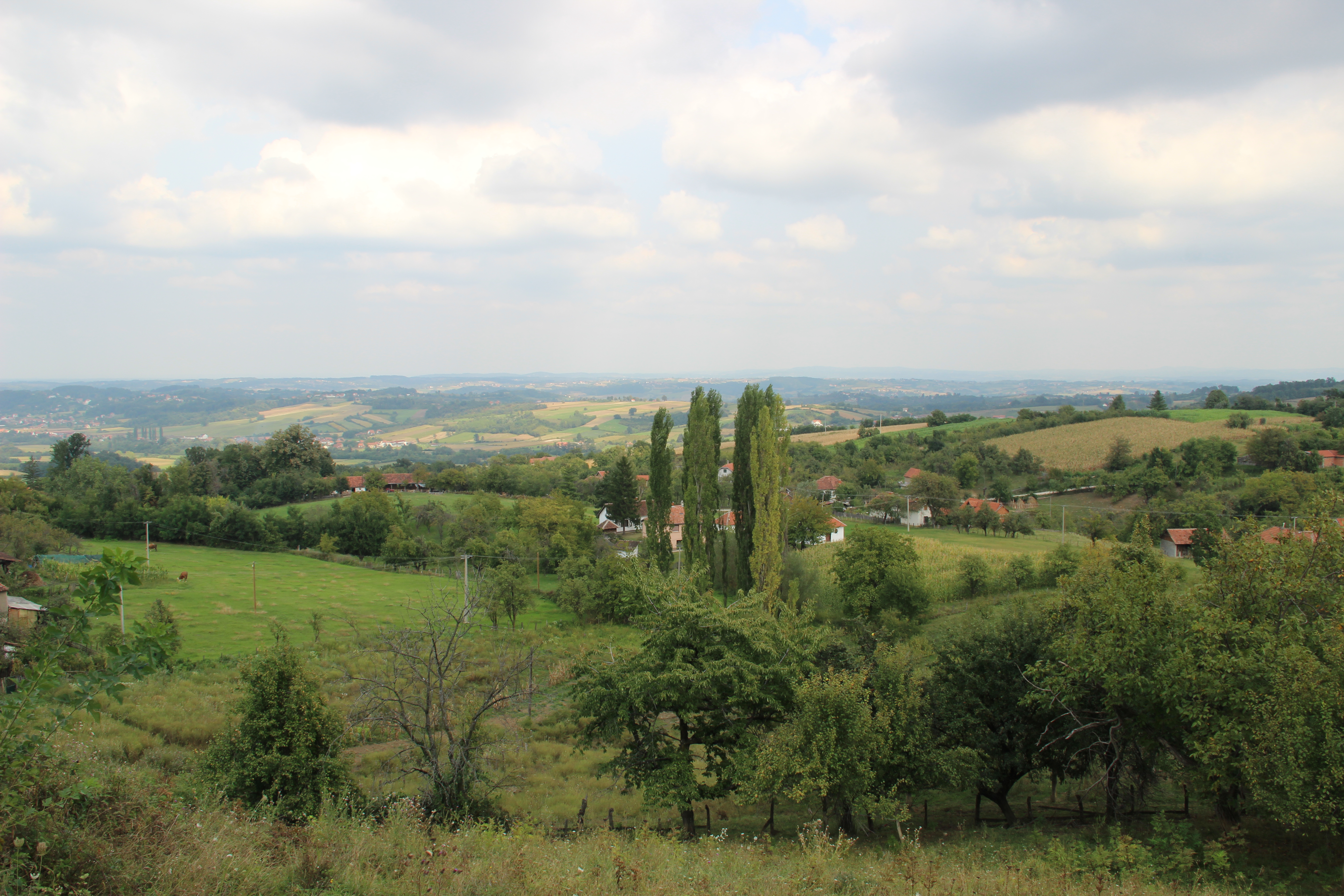
A view of Paštrić

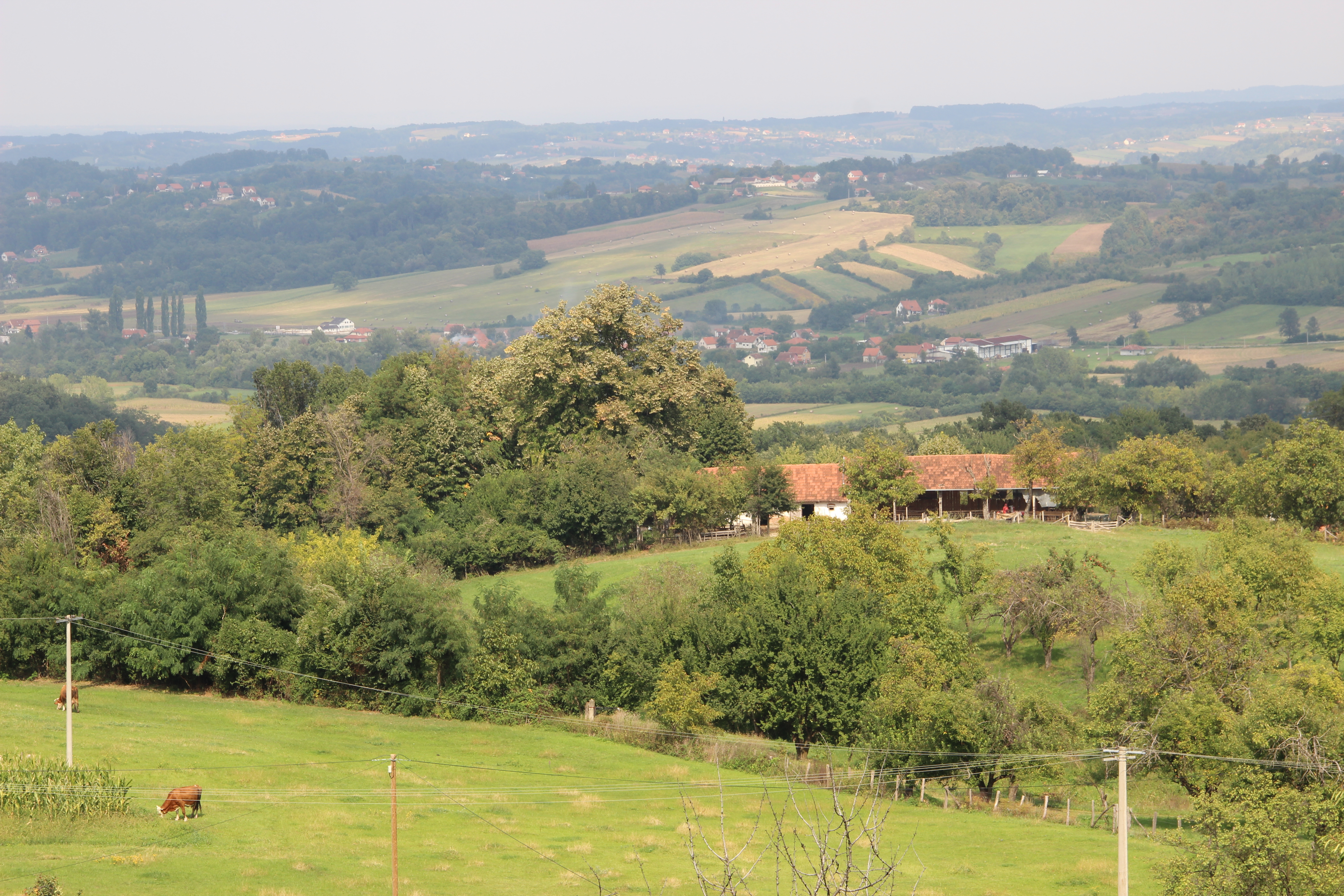
A view of Paštrić

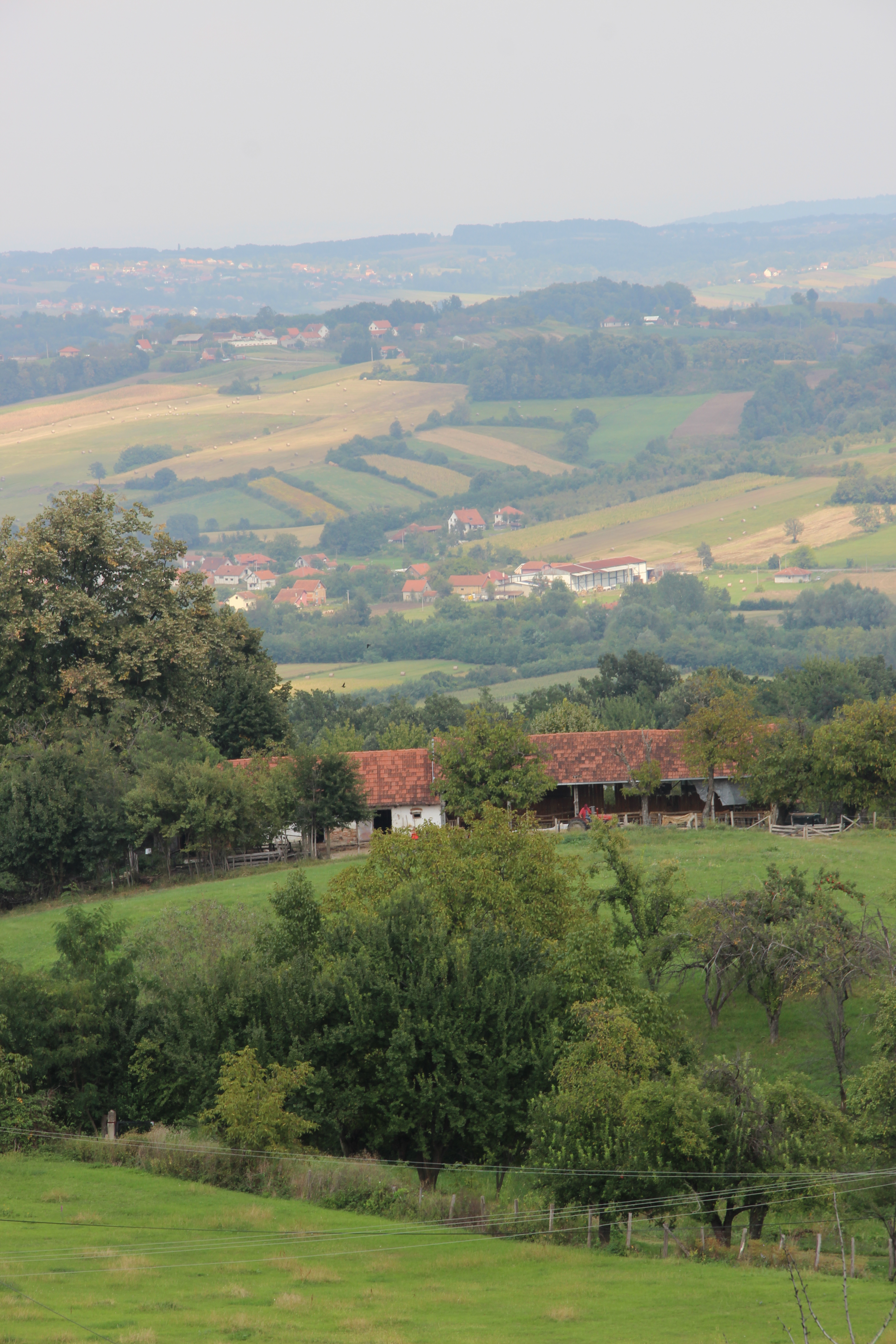
A view of Paštrić

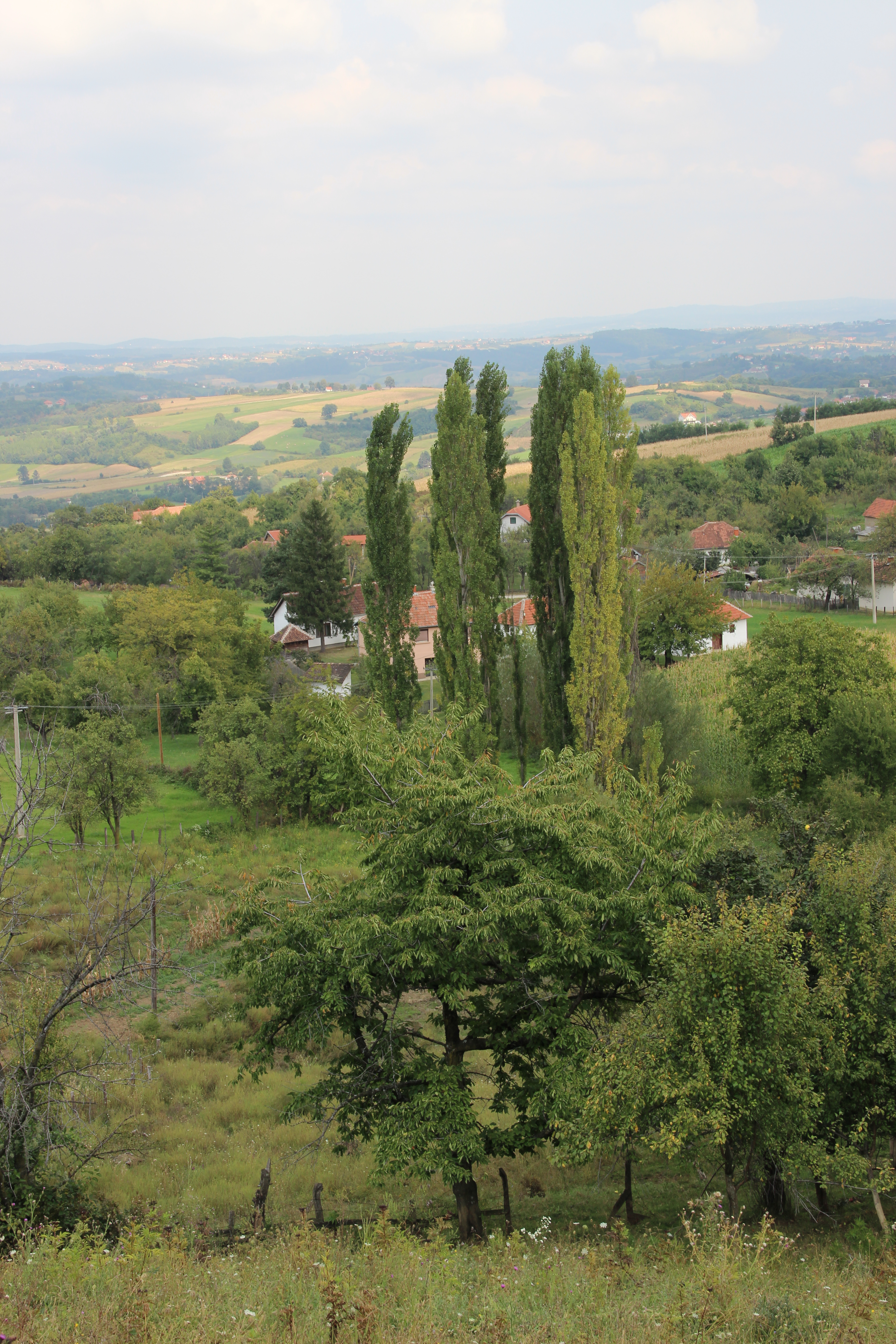
A view of Paštrić

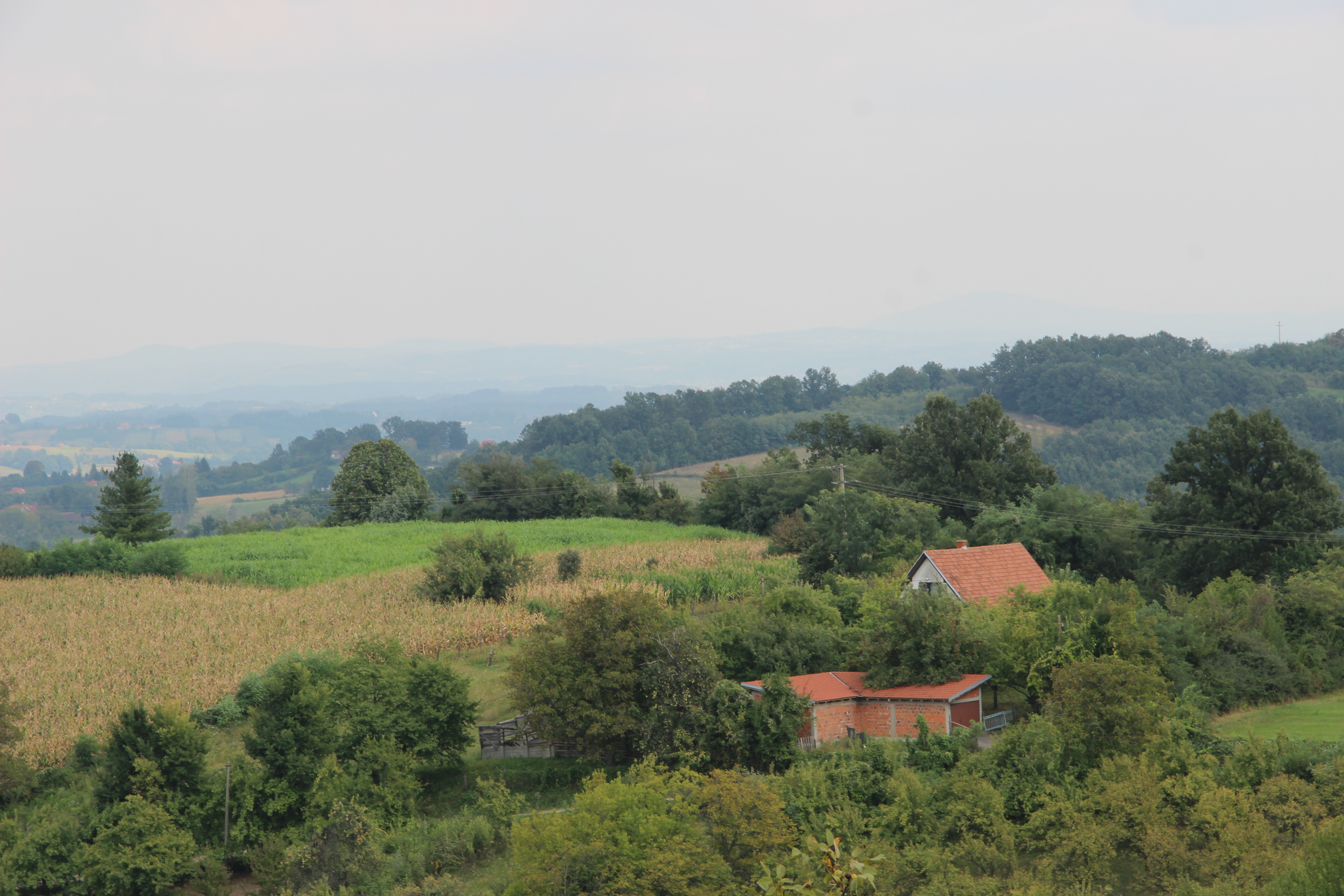
A view of Paštrić

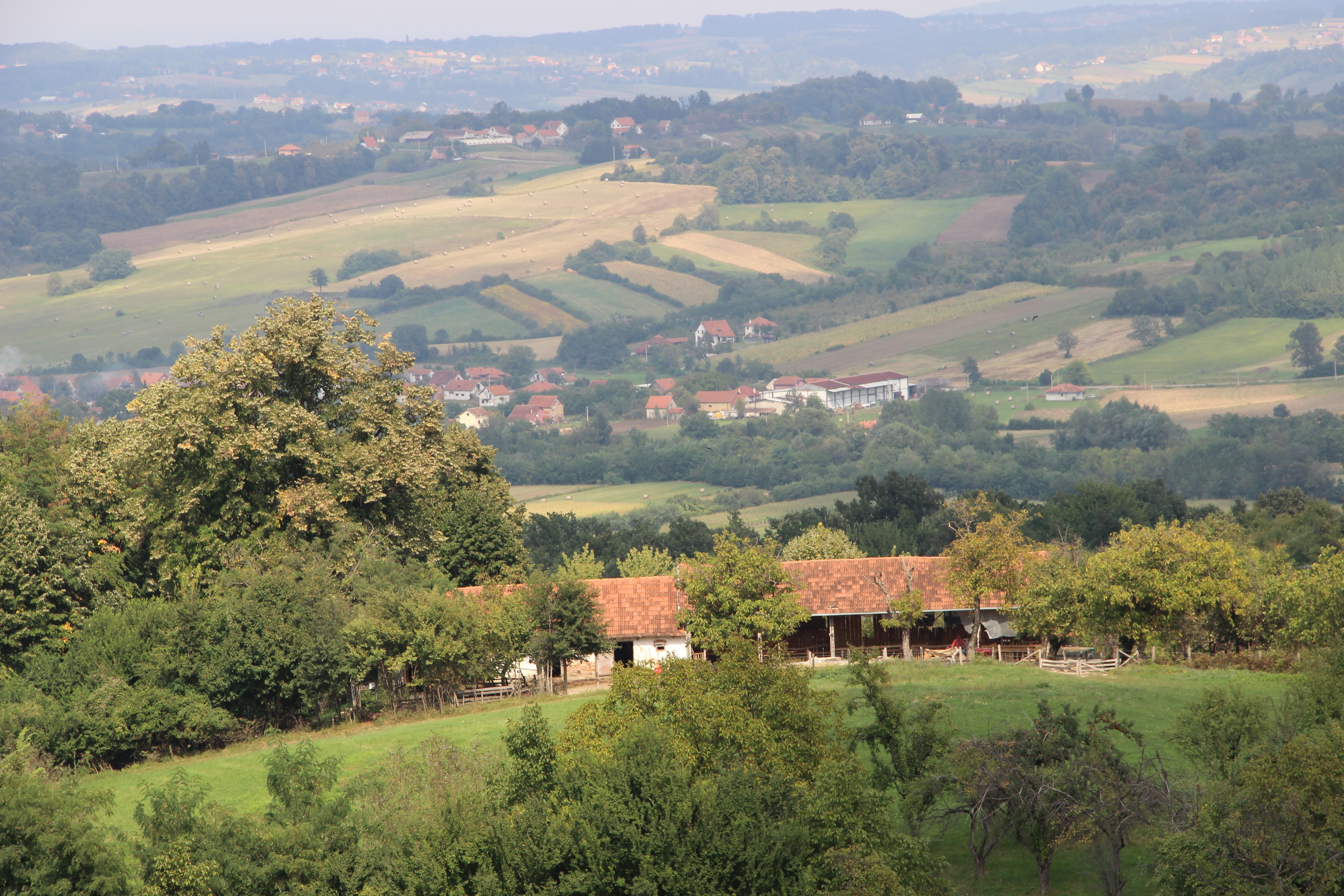
A view of Paštrić

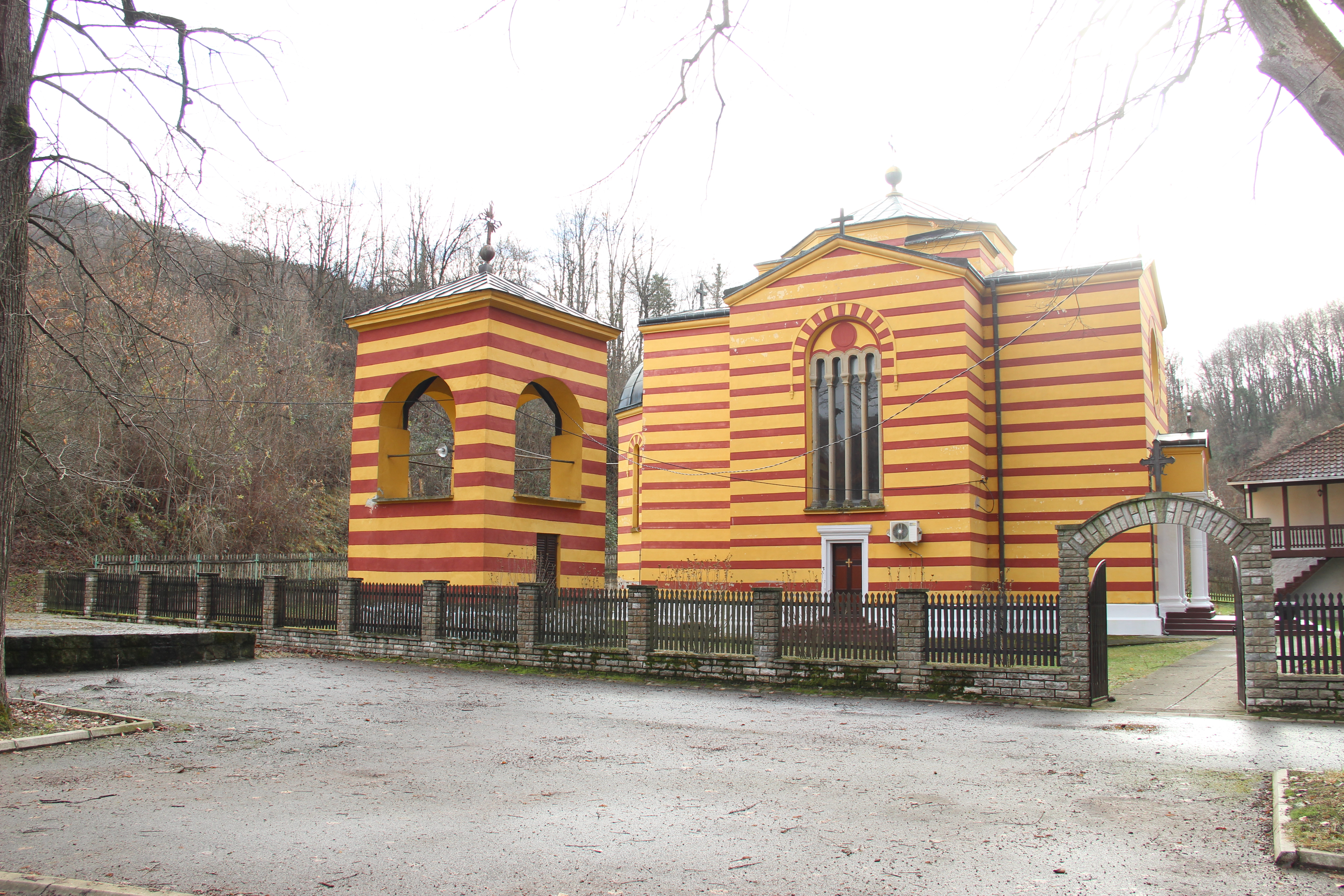
A monastery in Paštrić

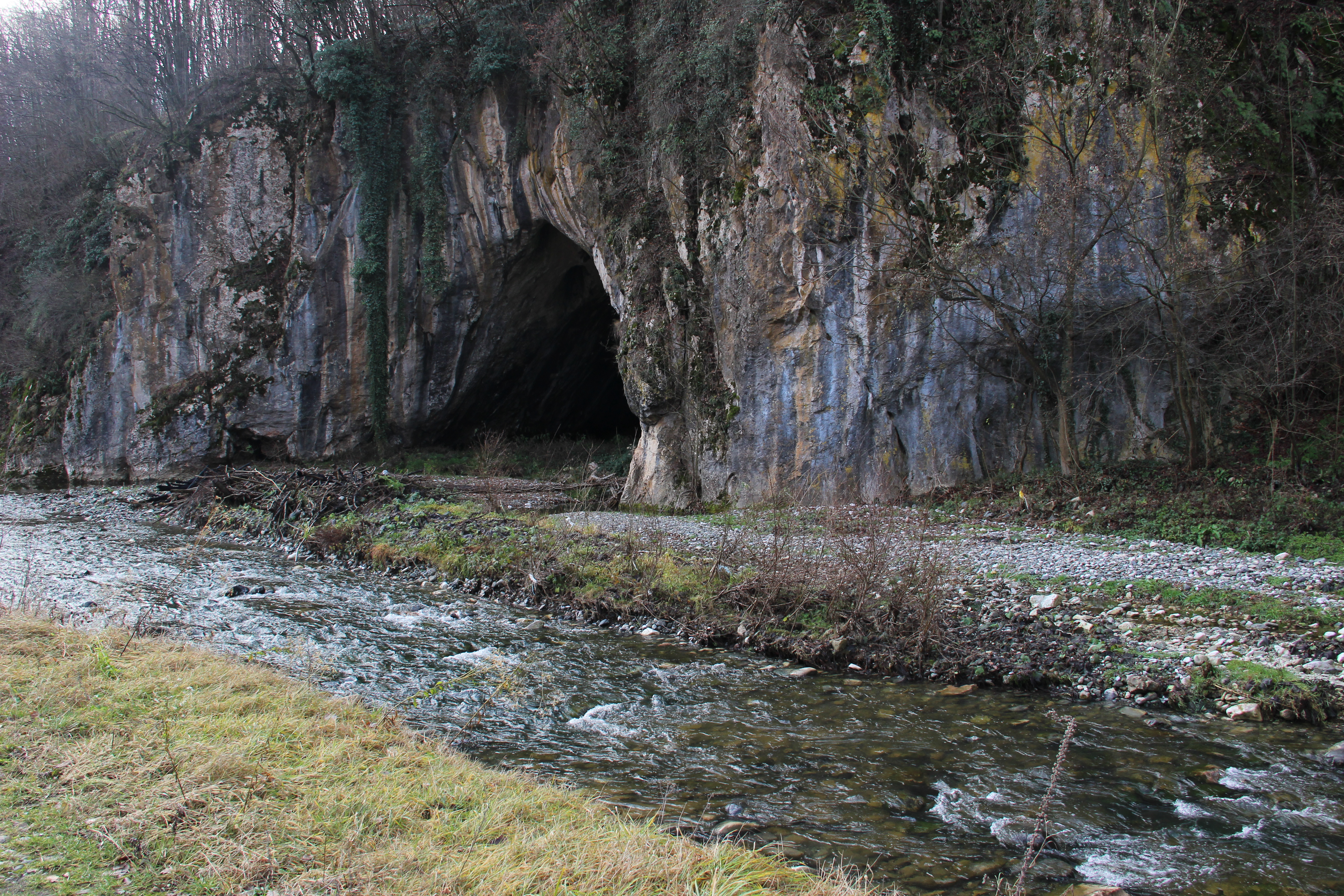
A cave in Paštrić

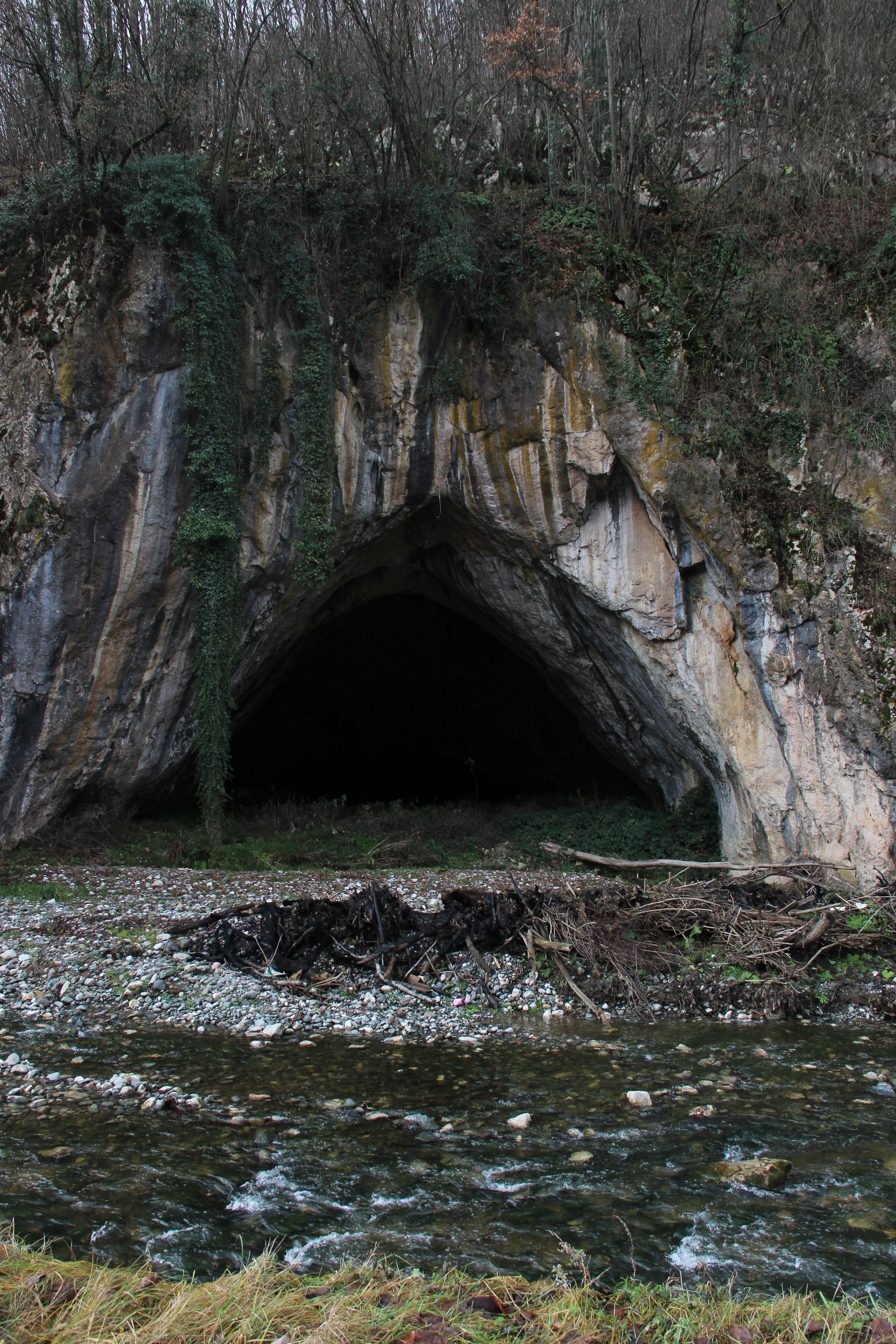
A cave in Paštrić

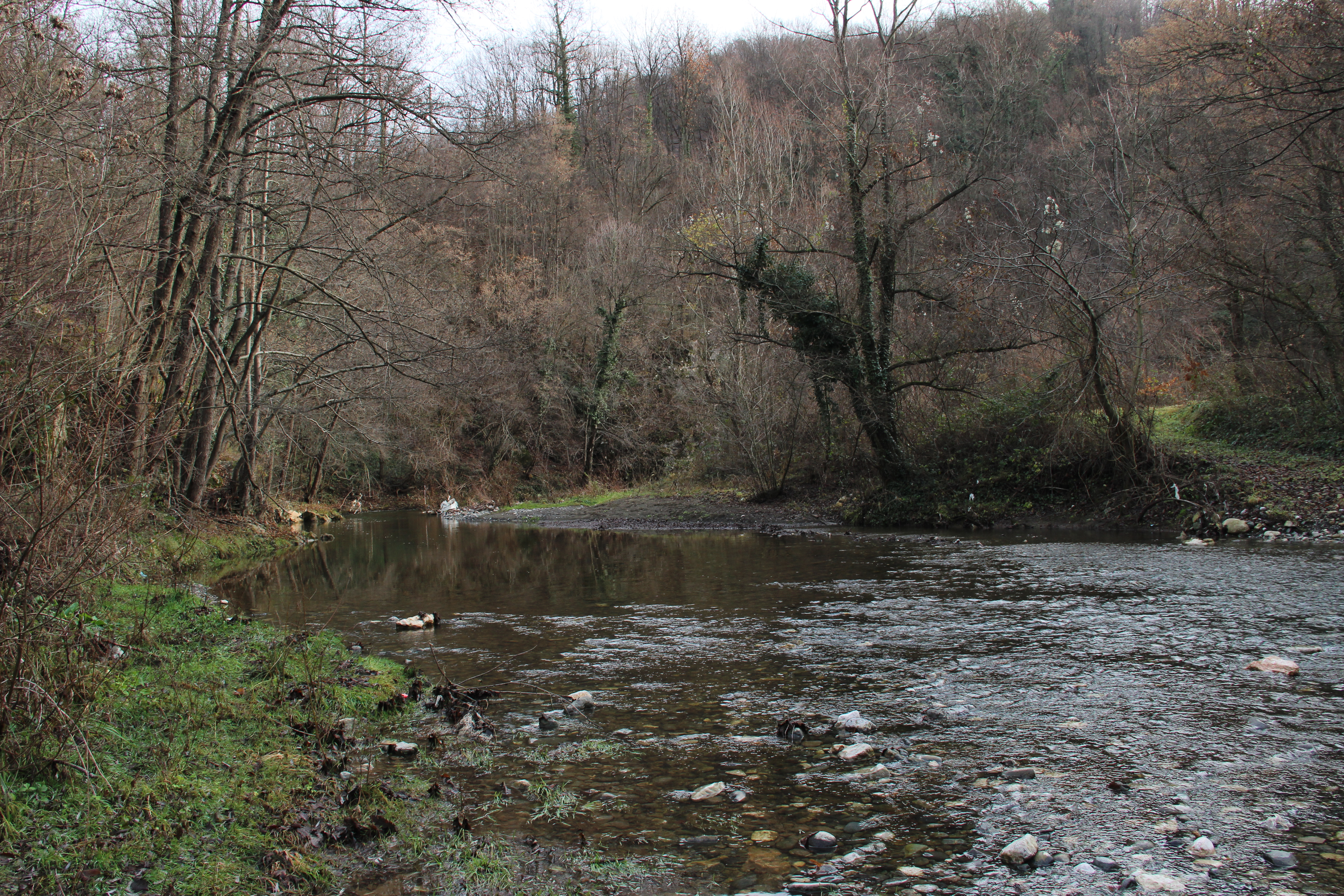
A river in Paštrić
