= Berkovac =

Coordinates: 44.1950°N 20.1442°E

Berkovac Берковац
- Village (Selo)
- Interactive map of Berkovac
- Country: Serbia
- District: Kolubara
- Municipality: Mionica
- Time zone: UTC+1 (CET)
  - Summer (DST): UTC+2 (CEST)

Berkovac (Serbian: Берковац) is a village situated at the north of the Mionica municipality, Kolubara District in Serbia.

== Population ==
As of September 2011, the population was 443 with a decrease of 2.51% since 2002.

The gender ratio at the time was 51% male & 49% female. The age group are mostly people between 18 and 64 years old, having 60% of the population, followed by 25.7% for people over 65 years & 14.2% for children under 18 years.

The age distribution is mostly people between 50-59 years old. This is a table showing the age distribution as of the 2011 census.

Age distribution
Age	Persons
0-9 years	31
10-19 years	39
20-29 years	41
30-39 years	52
40-49 years	60
50-59 years	71
60-69 years	67
70-79 years	59
80+ years	23

== Gallery ==
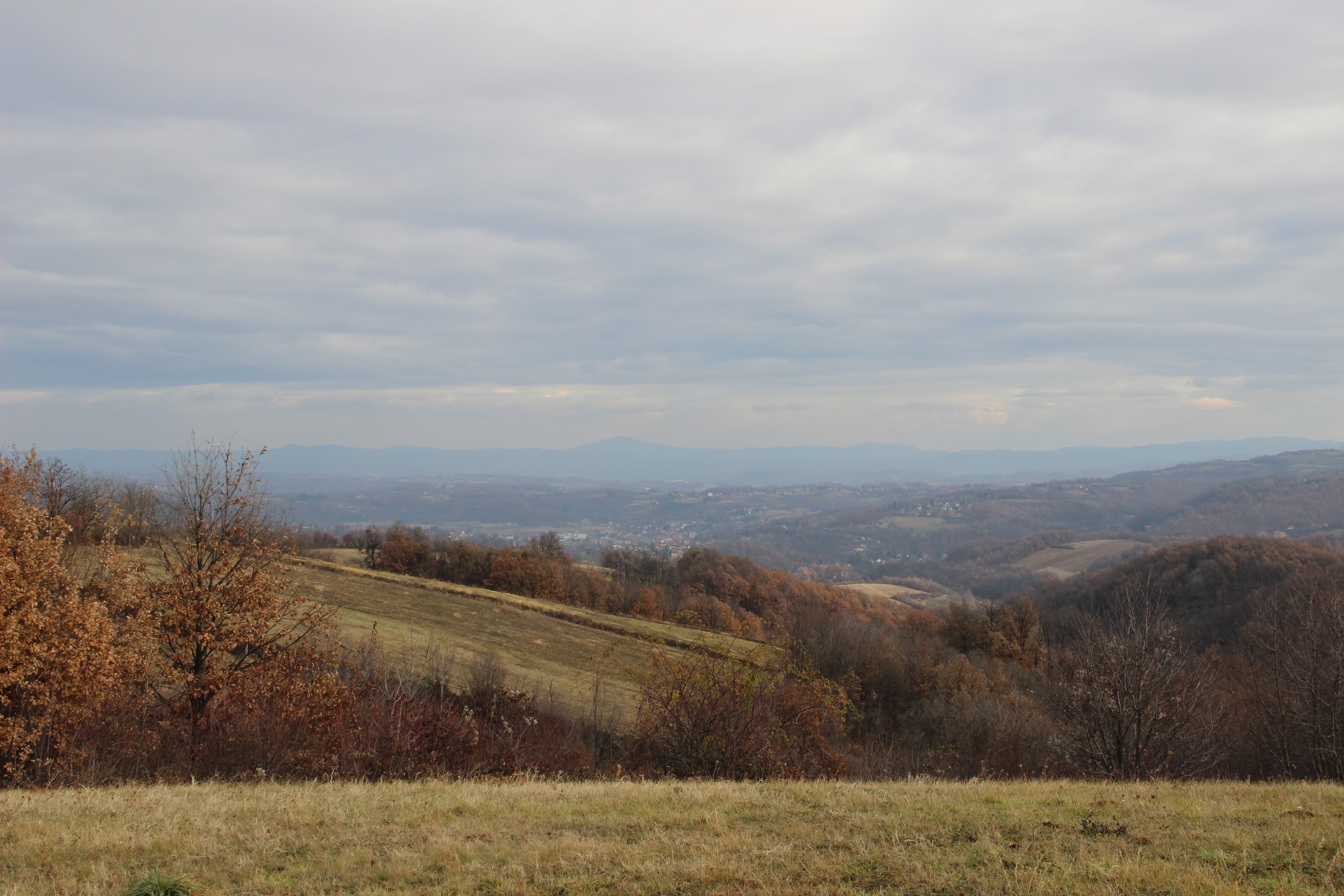
Berkovac - panorama

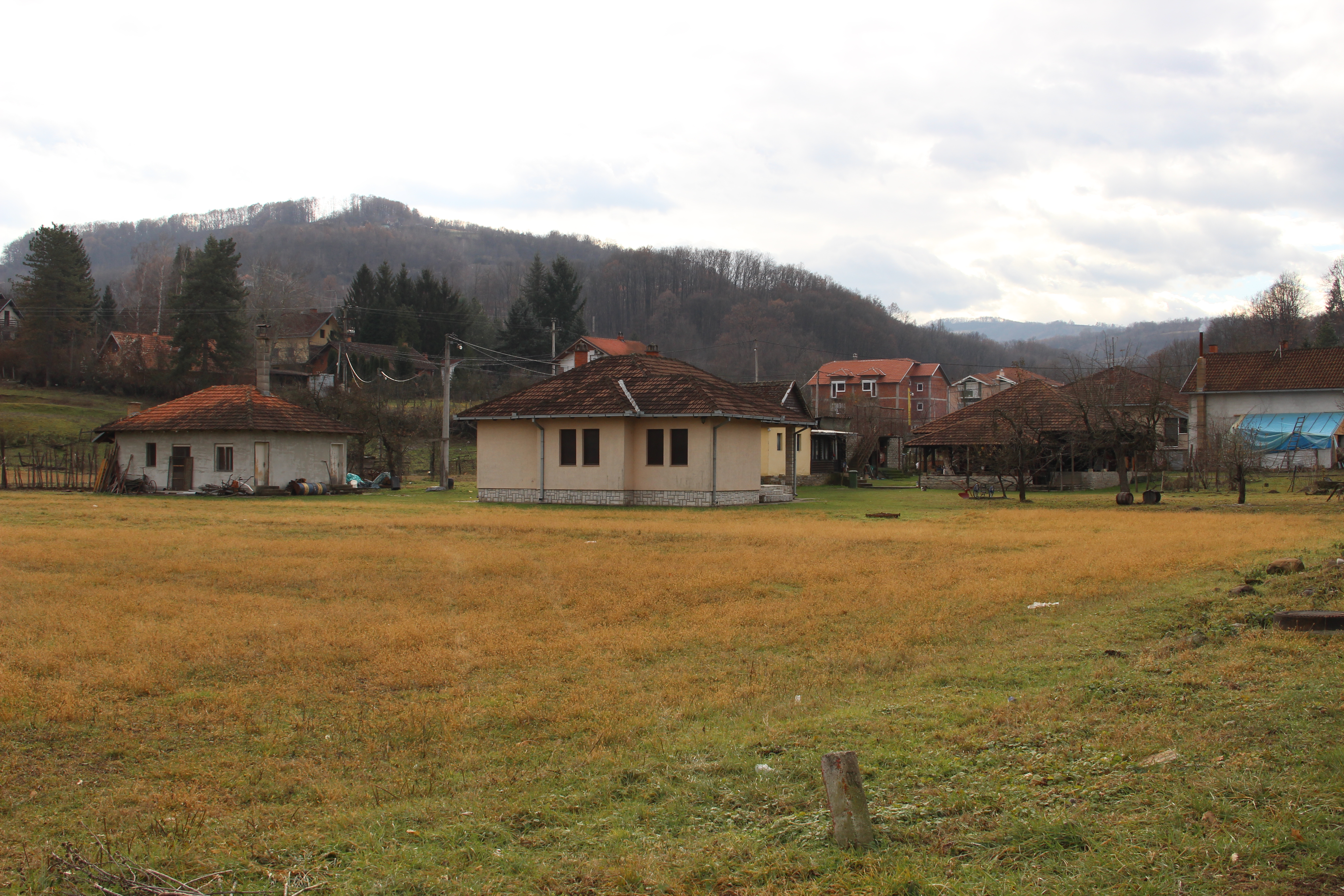
Berkovac - panorama

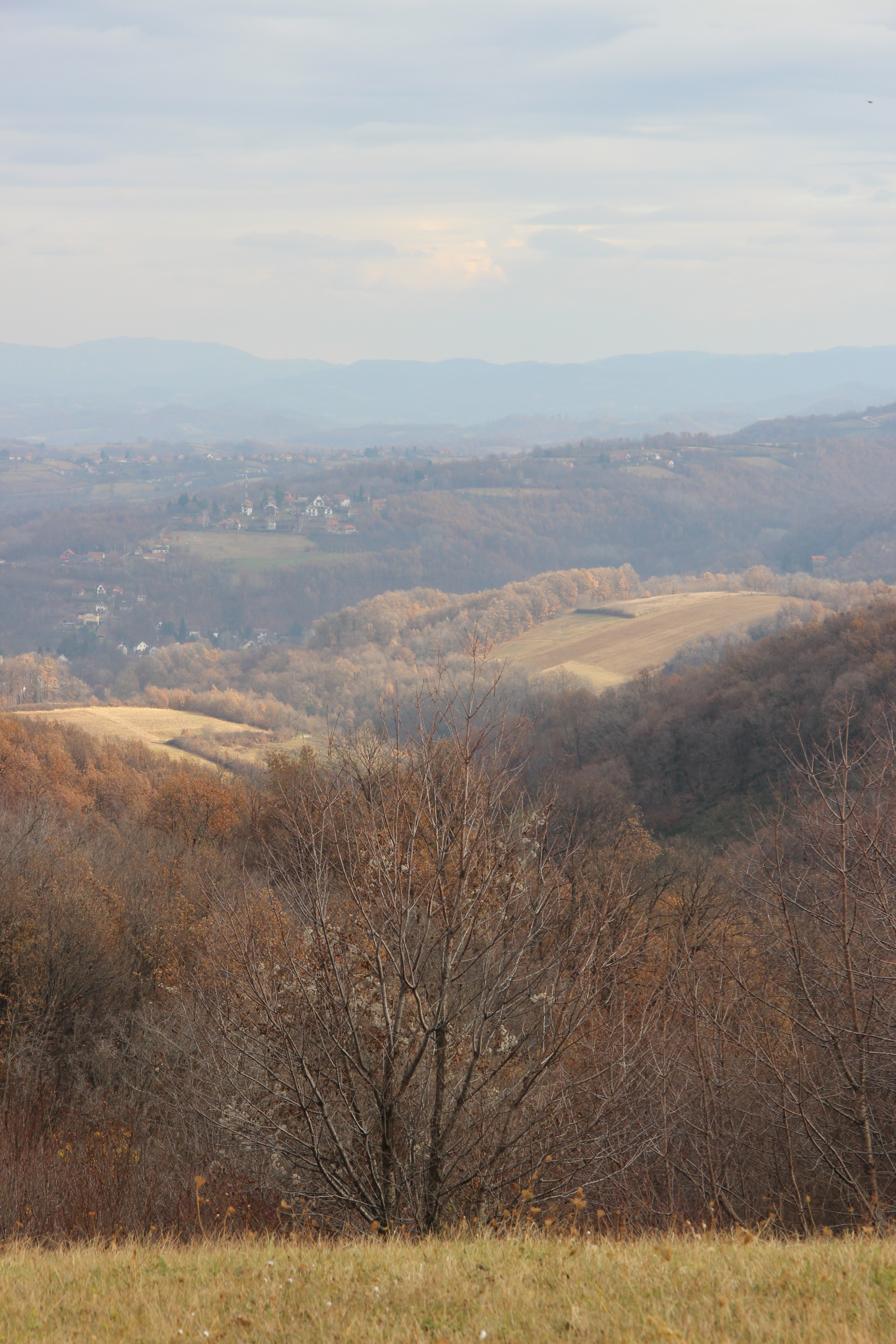
Berkovac - panorama

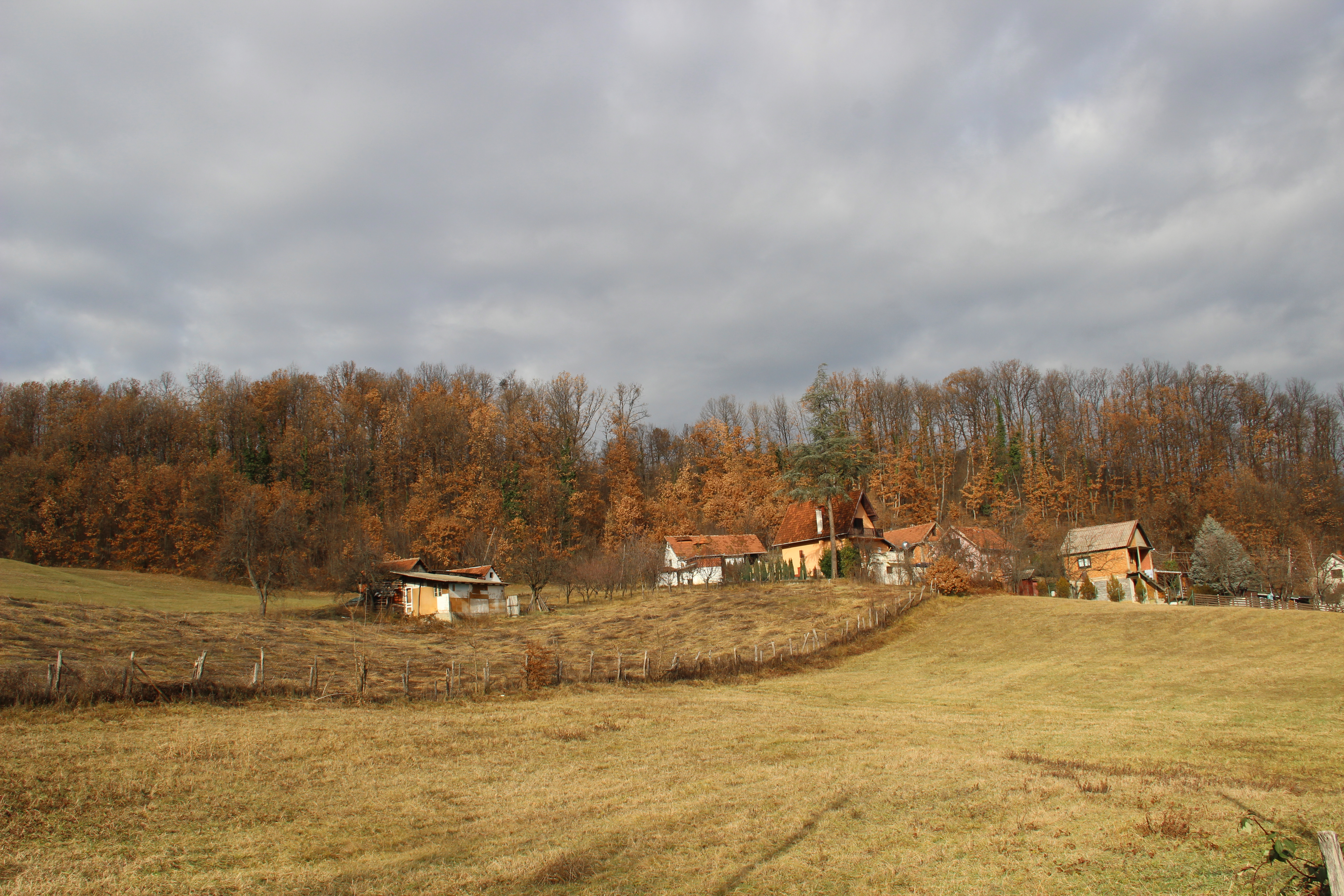
Berkovac - panorama

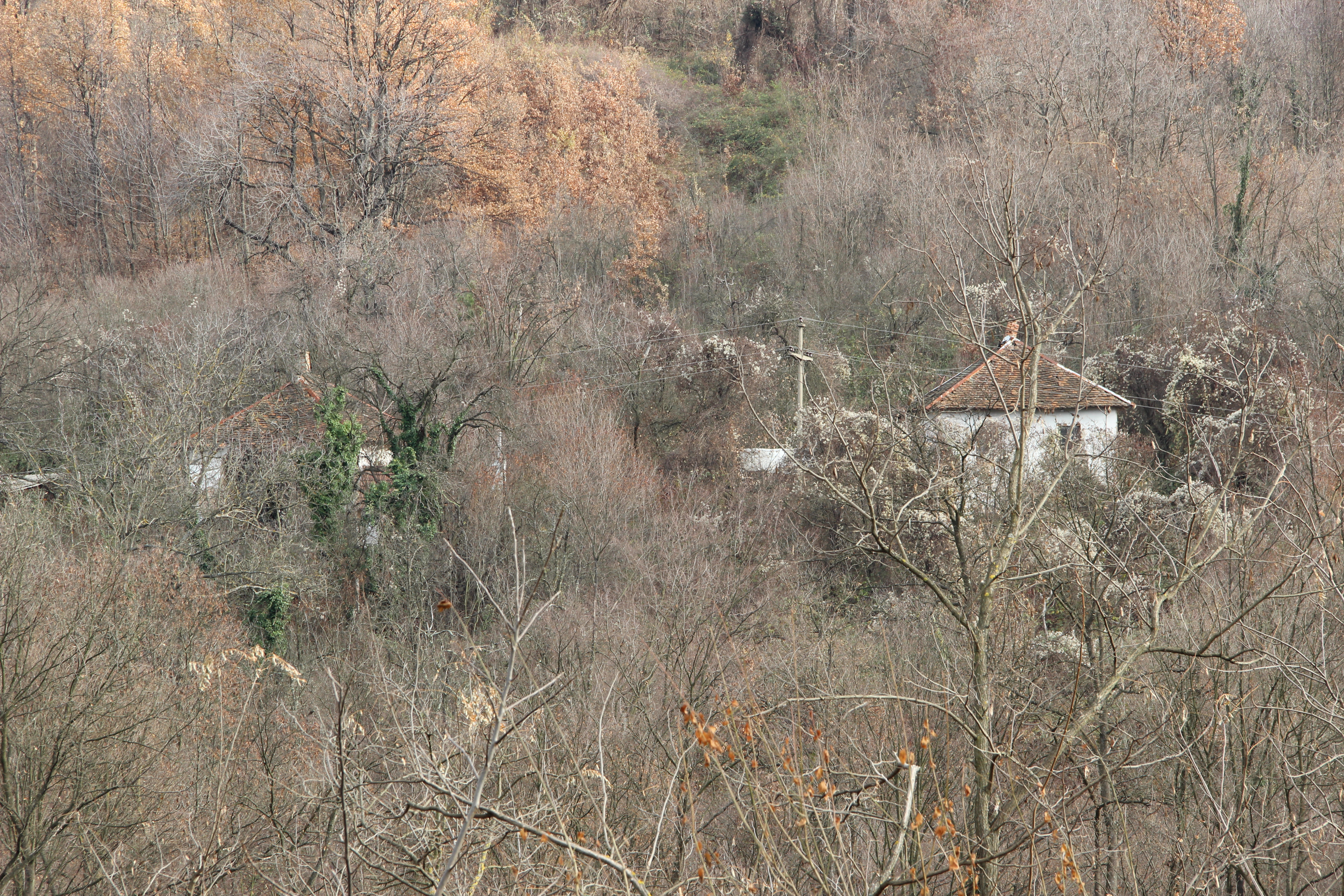
Berkovac - panorama

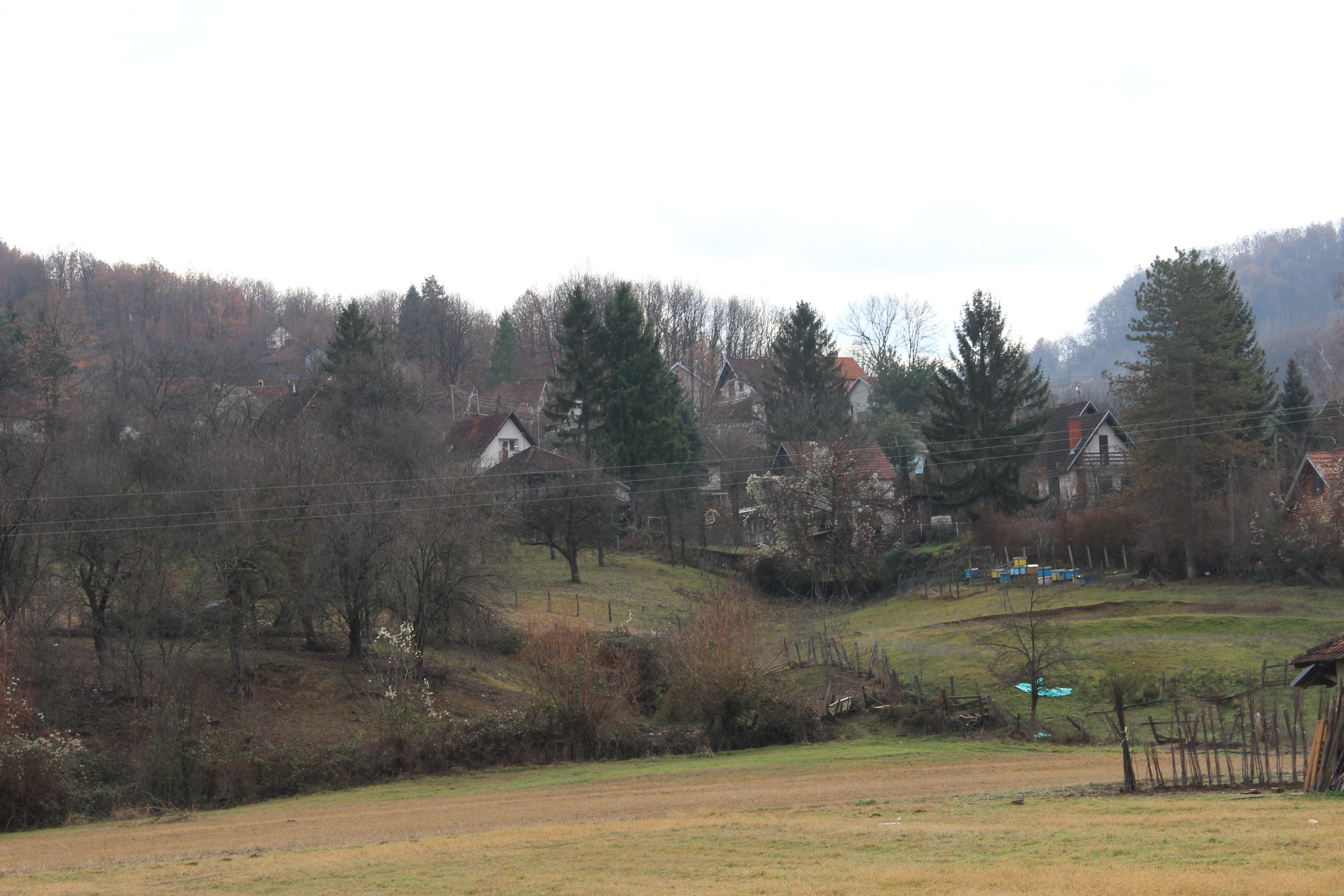
Berkovac - panorama
