= Virovac =

- Village (Selo)
- Location within Serbia
- Coordinates: 44°18′35″N 20°06′12″E
- Country: Serbia
- District: Kolubara District
- Municipality: Mionica
- Time zone: UTC+1 (CET)
  - Summer (DST): UTC+2 (CEST)

Virovac is a village situated in Mionica municipality in Serbia.

== Gallery ==
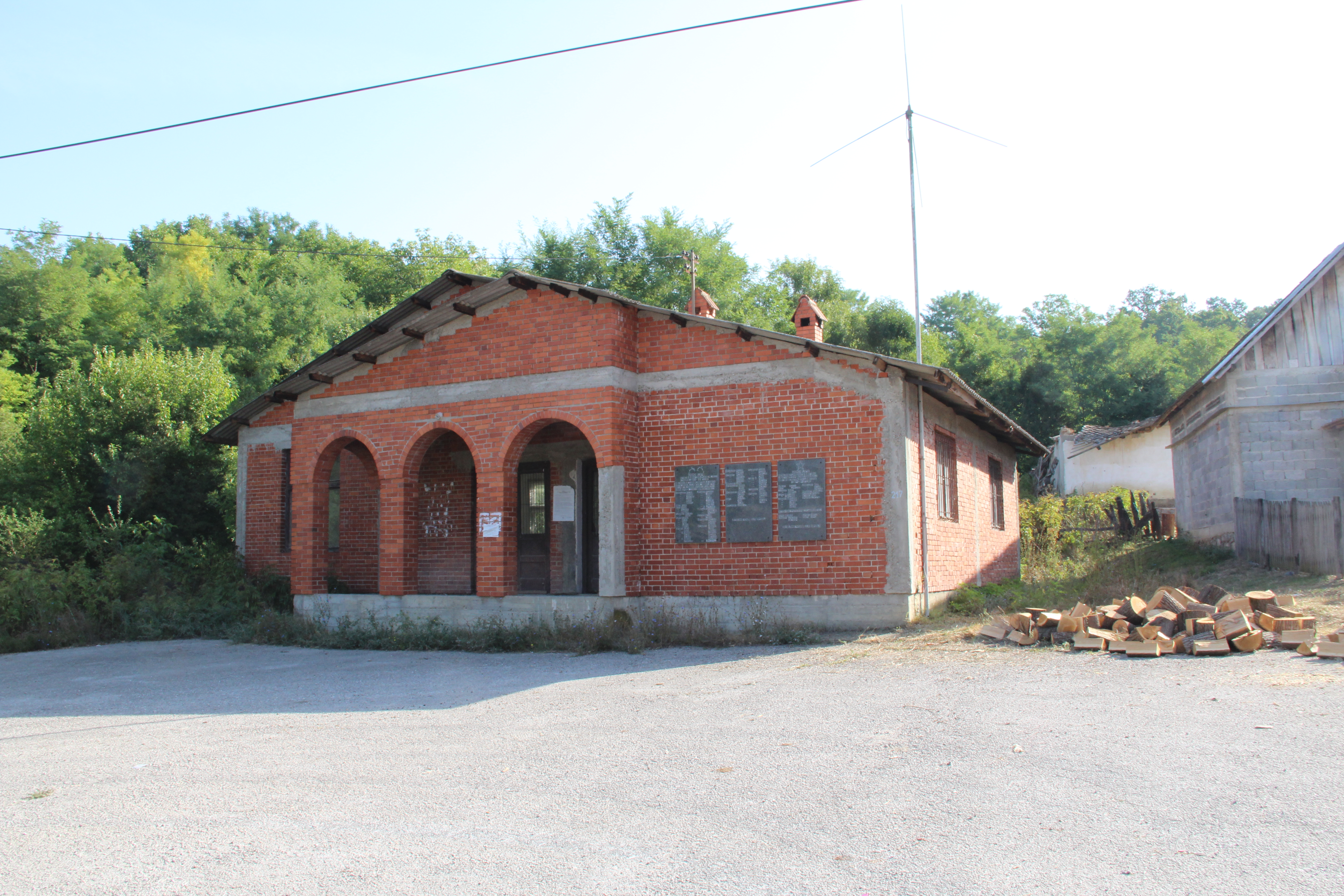
Virovac - Local community

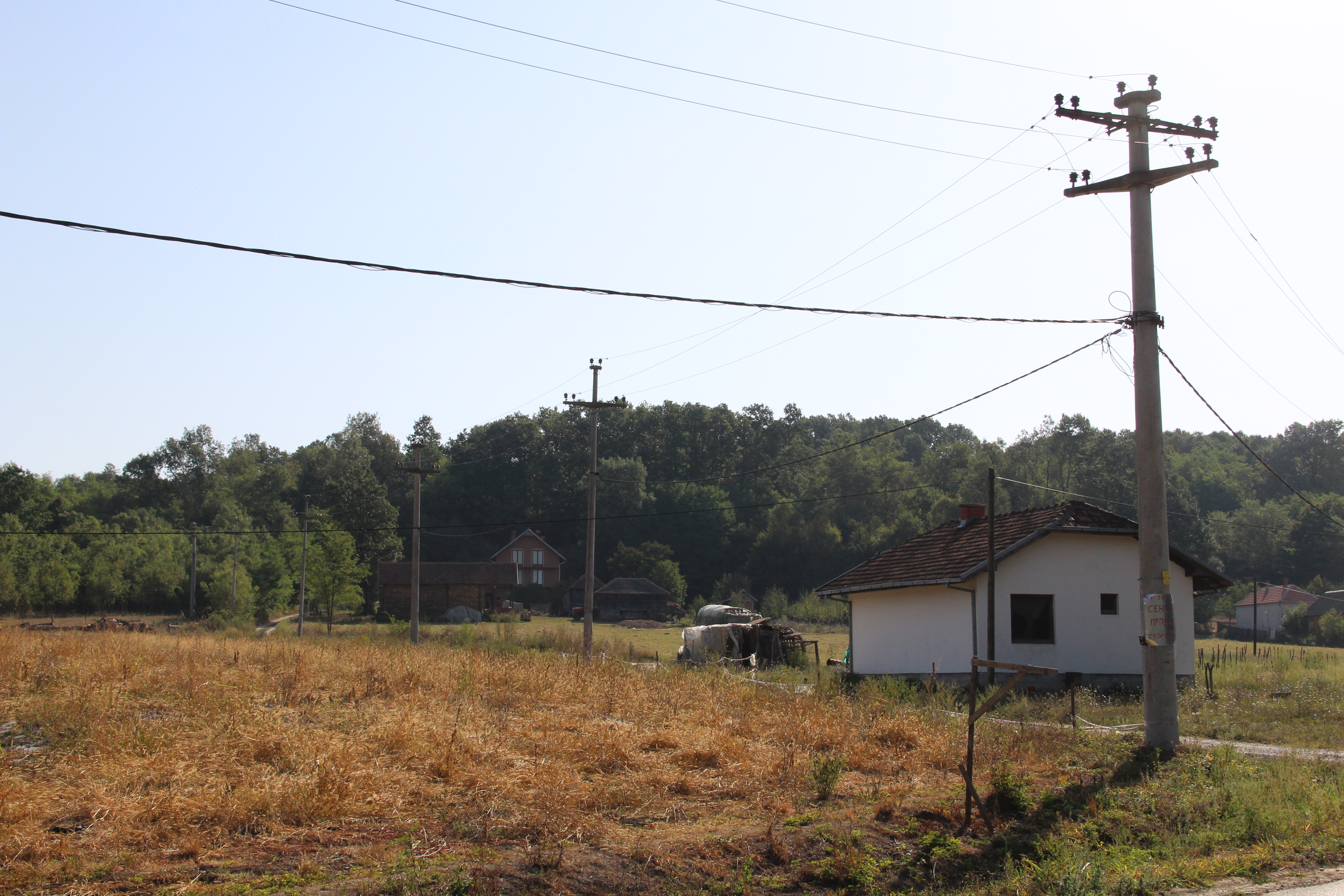
Virovac - Panorama

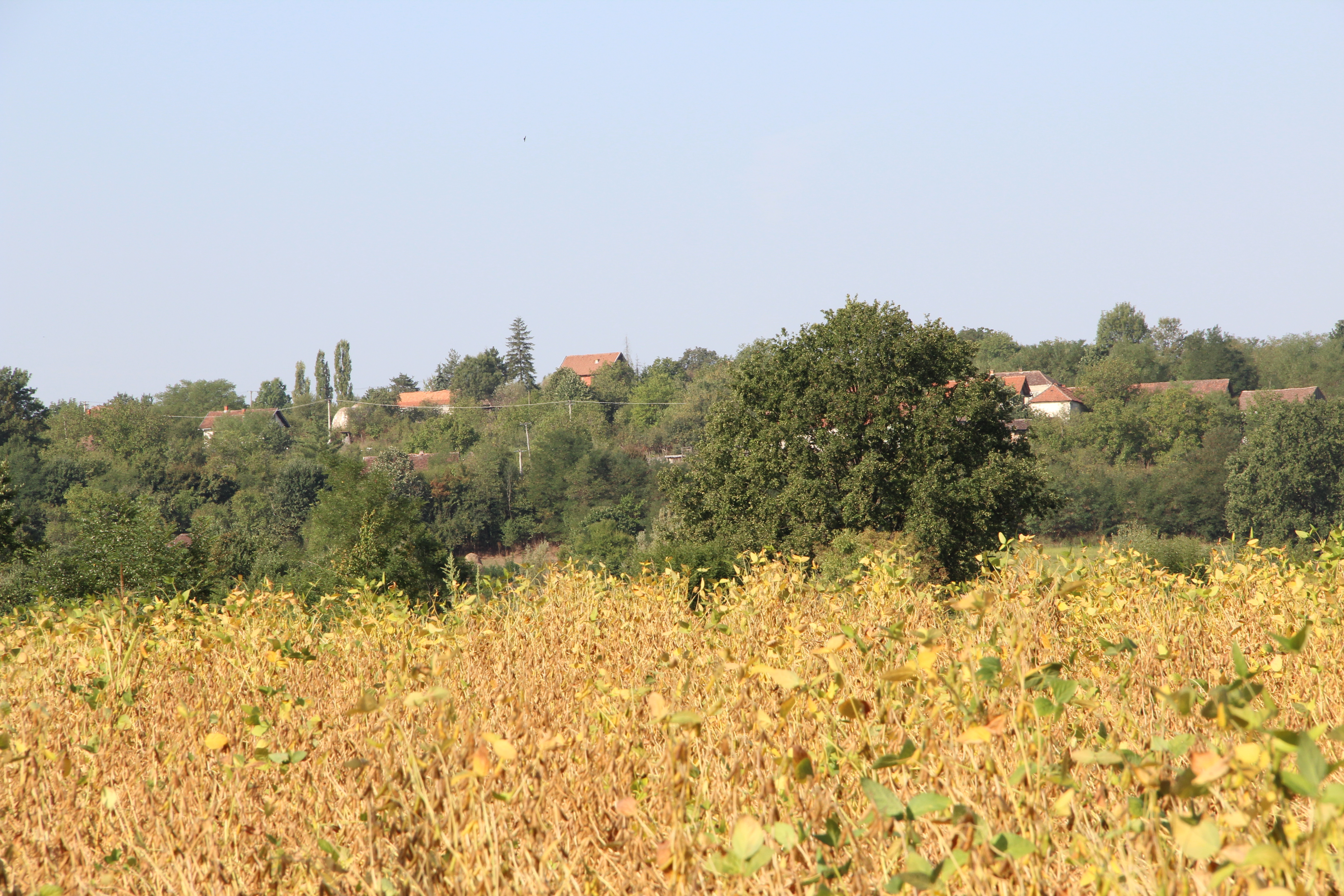
Virovac - Panorama

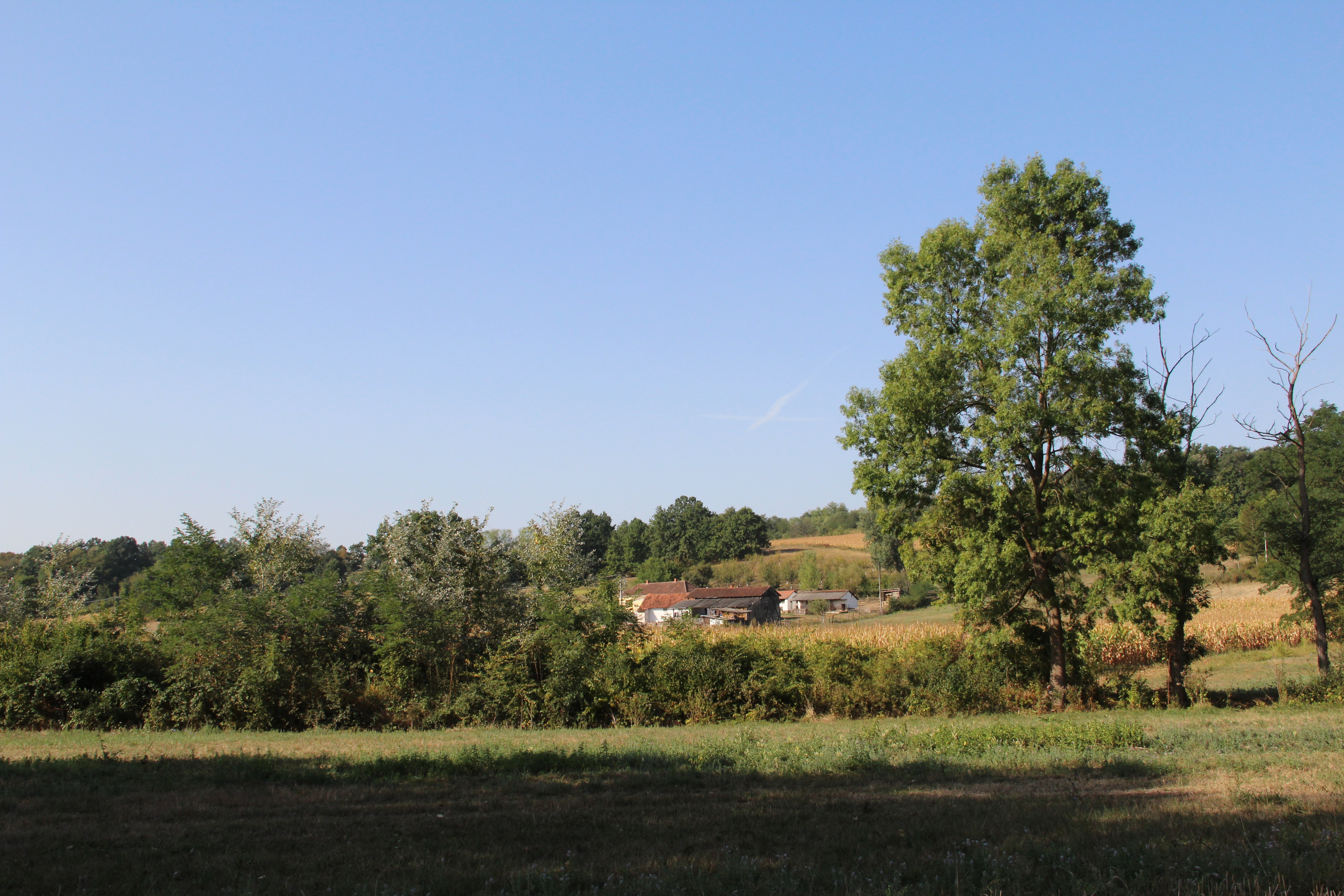
Virovac - Panorama

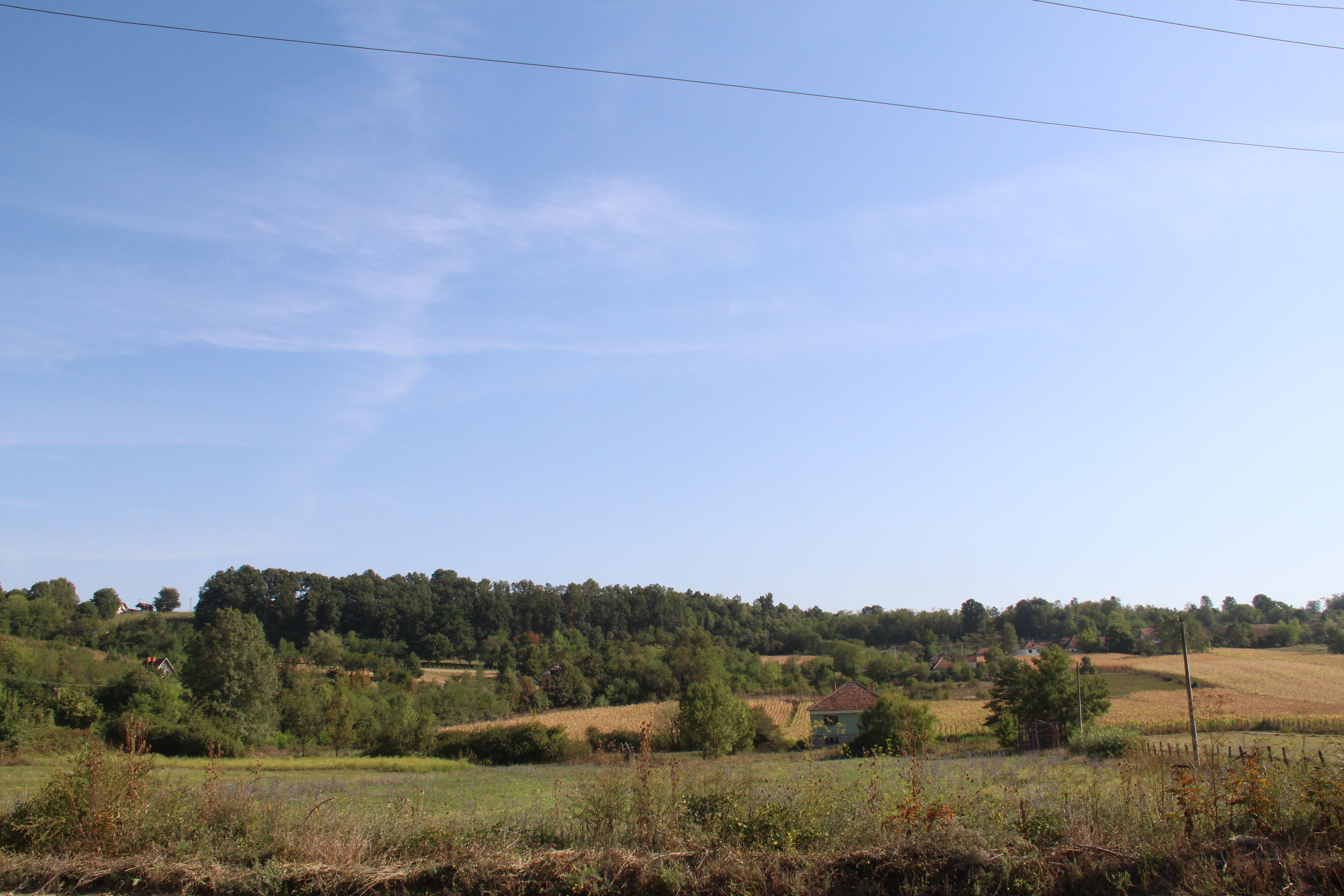
Virovac - Panorama

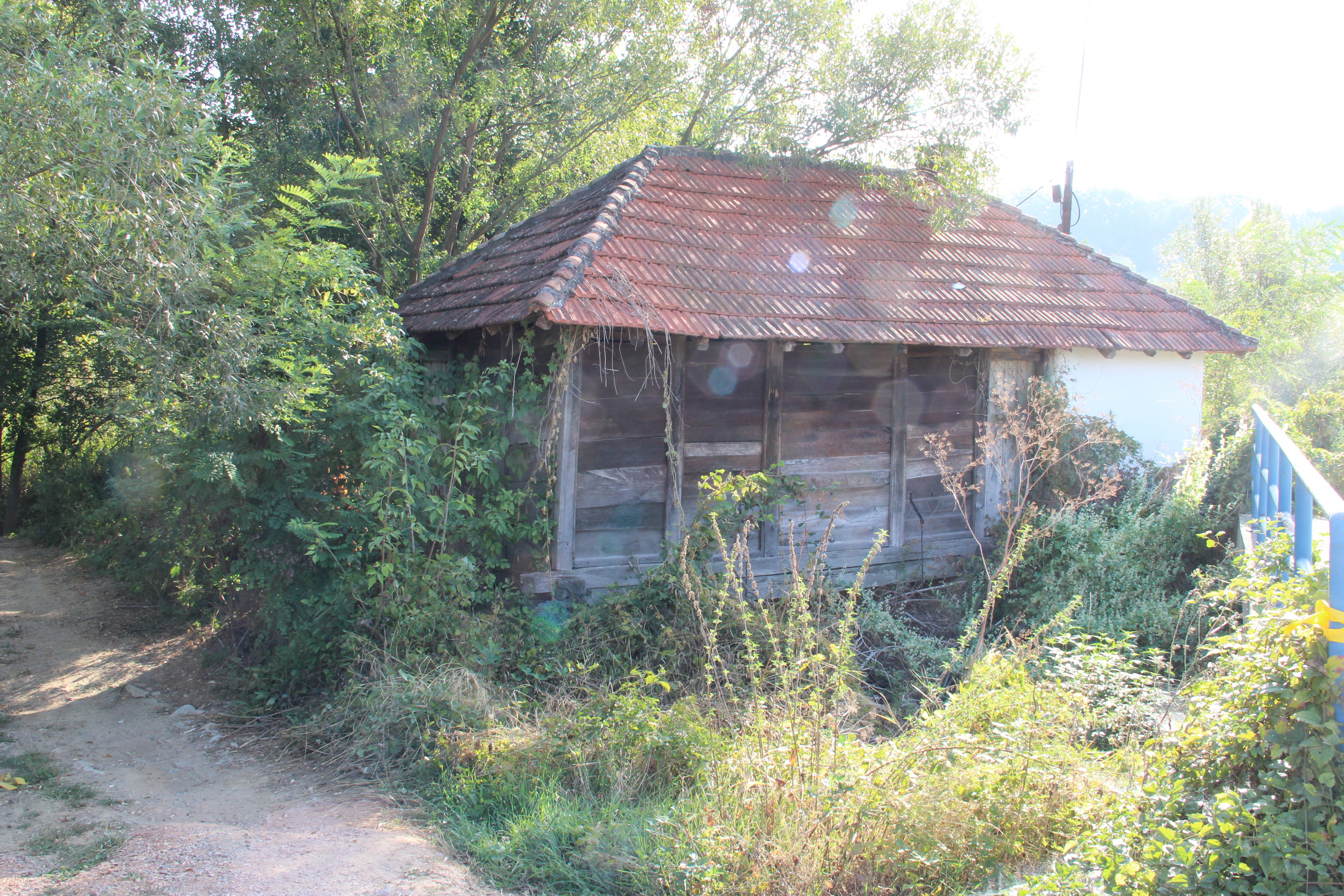
Virovac - Mill

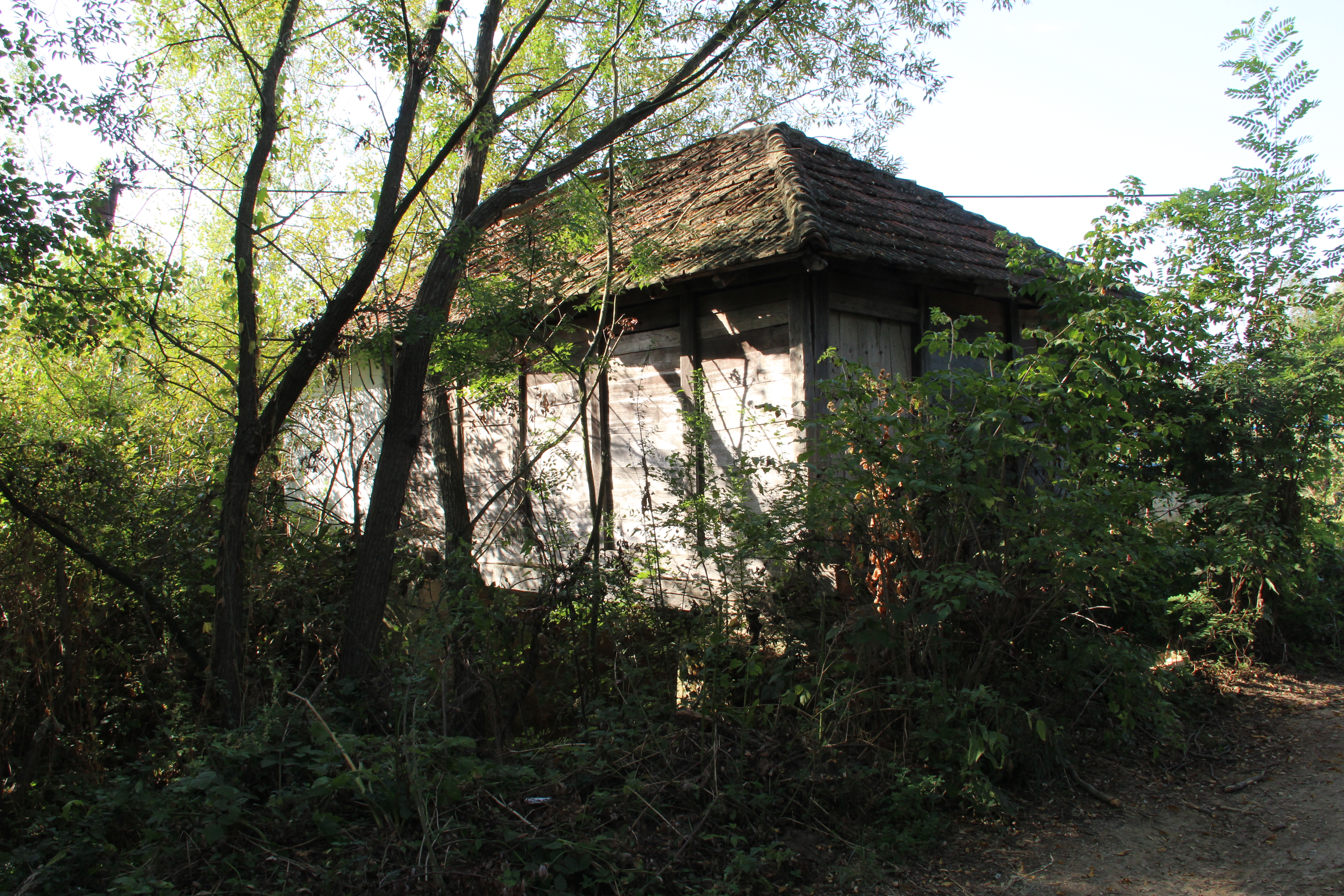
Virovac - Mill

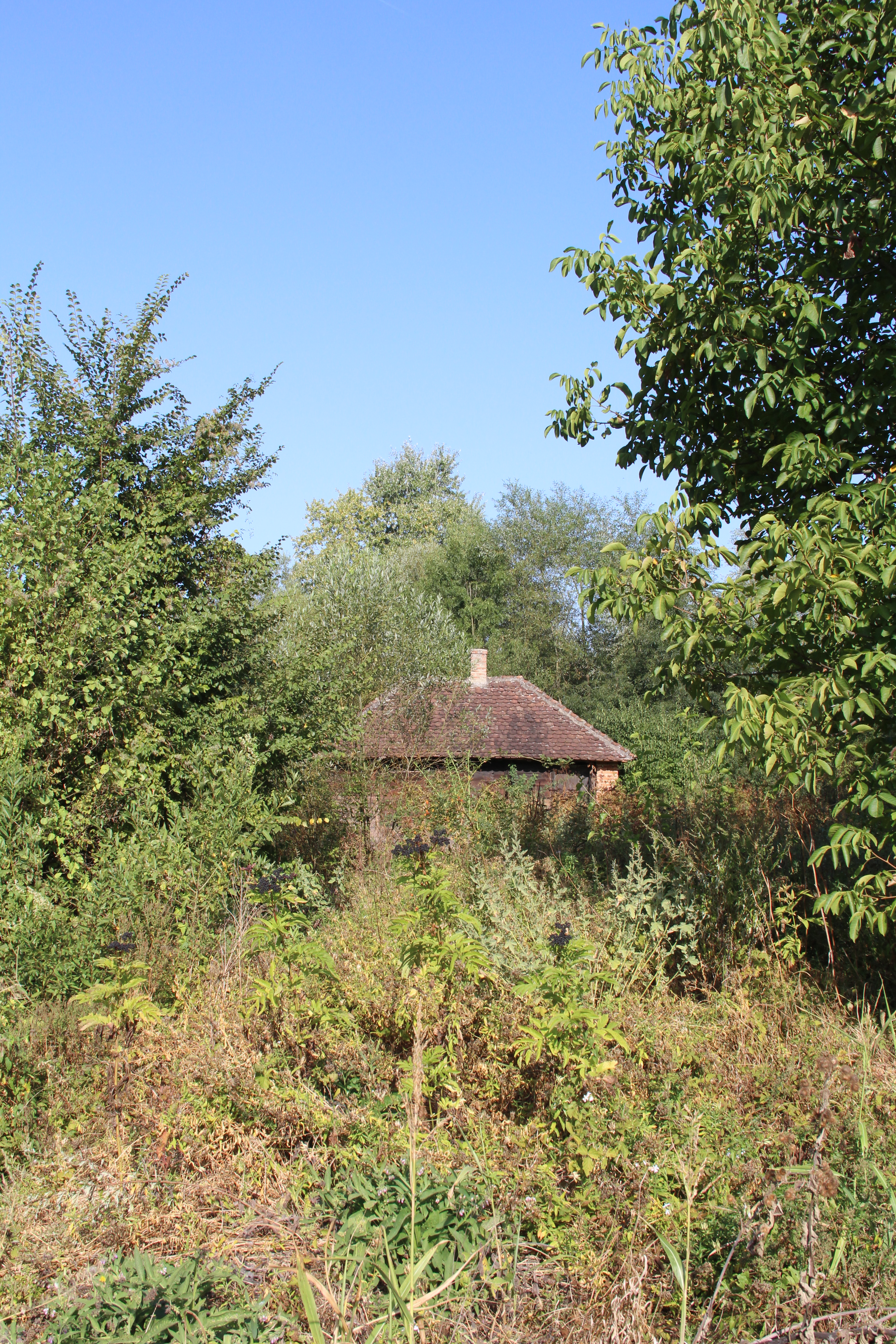
Virovac - Mill
