= Hubert Lanz =

German general (1896–1982)

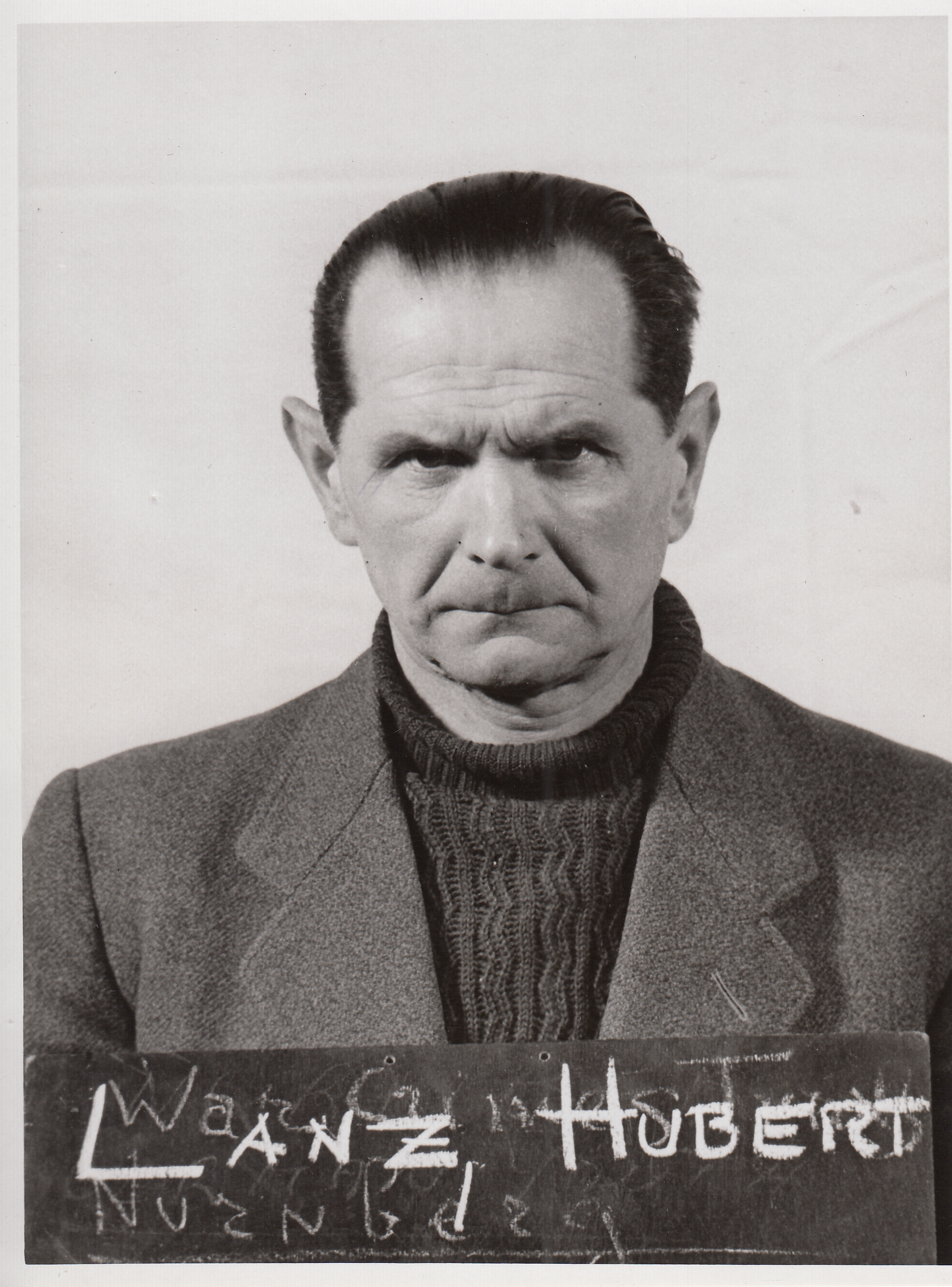
- Lanz during the Hostages Trial
- Born: 22 May 1896; Entringen, Kingdom of Württemberg, German Empire
- Died: 12 May 1982 (aged 85); Munich, West Germany
- Known for: Cephalonia massacre
- Status: Deceased
- Conviction: War crimes
- Trial: Hostages Trial
- Penalty: 12 years imprisonment; commuted to time served
- Military career
- Relatives: Albrecht Lanz (brother)
- Allegiance: German Empire; Weimar Republic; Nazi Germany
- Branch: German Army
- Service years: 1914–1945
- Rank: General der Gebirgstruppe
- Commands: 1st Mountain Division; Army Detachment Lanz; XXXXIX Mountain Corps; XXII Mountain Corps
- Conflicts: World War II; Balkans Campaign; Eastern Front; Security warfare in Greece
- Awards: Knight's Cross of the Iron Cross with Oak Leaves

Karl Hubert Lanz (22 May 1896 – 12 May 1982) was a German general during the Second World War, in which he led units in the Eastern Front and in the Balkans. After the war, he was tried for war crimes and convicted in the Southeast Case, specifically for several atrocities committed by units under his command in the Balkans. Released in 1951, he joined the liberal Free Democratic Party and served as its adviser on military and security issues.

== Early career ==
Lanz entered the Army on 20 June 1914, shortly before the outbreak of World War I and served in the Western Front, and ended it with the rank of lieutenant (Oberleutnant). He was retained in the reduced post-war Reichswehr, being promoted to captain on 1 February 1928. In the period 1932–1934 he commanded a company in an infantry regiment at Gumbinnen, and was subsequently employed in staff duties, being promoted to lieutenant-colonel and Chief of Staff of IX Army Corps on 1 March 1937. After a period of command of the 100th Gebirgsjäger Regiment from November 1937 to August 1938, he assumed the position of Chief of Staff of the Military District V.

== World War II ==
=== France and Yugoslavia ===
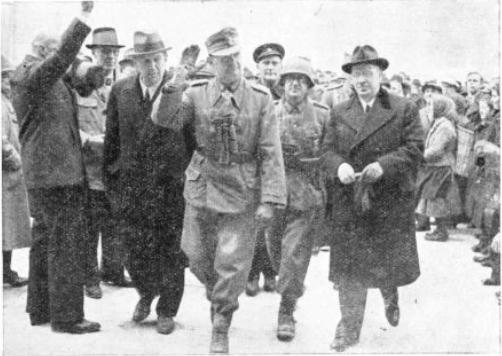
General Lanz entering Celje, Yugoslavia in April 1941 to take control.

On 15 February 1940, he was posted as Chief of Staff for the XVIII Corps. On 1 October, he was awarded the Knight's Cross of the Iron Cross for his performance in this position during the Battle of France. On 26 October, he assumed command of the 1st Mountain Division, which was earmarked for Operation Felix, the assault on Gibraltar. With Felix cancelled, the division was transferred East, where it took part in the Invasion of Yugoslavia in April 1941 as part of the 2nd Army.

=== Eastern Front ===
In June 1941, Lanz led his division in the invasion of the Soviet Union. On 30 June, his division conquered Lvov. There, the Germans discovered several thousand bodies of prisoners who had been executed by the NKVD, as they could not be evacuated. As the news spread, a large-scale anti-Jewish pogrom broke out, in which the town's Ukrainian population participated, stirred up in part by German and OUN posters and proclamations calling for revenge against the "Jewish Bolshevik murders".

Lanz continued to command the division during its advance in the Soviet Union, participating in the breakthrough of the Stalin Line and the advance to the Dnjepr and the Mius River. In May 1942, Lanz's division fought in the Second Battle of Kharkov and then participated in the Fall Blau offensive through southern Russia and into the Caucasus (Operation Edelweiss). In a symbolic propaganda move, on 21 August, Lanz sent a detachment of his men to raise the German flag on Mount Elbrus. Although the feat was widely publicized by Joseph Goebbels, Hitler was furious at this.

Relieved of command on 17 December 1942, he was awarded the Oak Leaves to the Knight's Cross on the 23rd. Following the collapse of the German front after the Battle of Stalingrad, on 26 January 1943 Lanz was promoted to general and placed in command of the Army Detachment Lanz (Armeeabteilung Lanz), a formation made up of various German forces after the collapse of the Italian 8th Army, including the elite troops of the II SS Panzer Corps under General Paul Hausser. Lanz was tasked by Hitler to hold the area of Kharkov, even though he was outnumbered by almost 4:1. Following the loss of the city to the advancing Red Army, he was again dismissed on 20 February, although the decision to abandon the city without a fight had been taken by Hausser against Lanz's orders. On 25 June he was appointed provisional commander of XXXXIX Mountain Corps in the Crimea, a post he retained for a month.

=== Greece ===
==== Security warfare in Epirus ====
On 8 September 1943, while in Athens, Lanz was ordered to disarm the Italian military command after Italy's armistice with the Allies. On 9 September, he assumed command of the newly formed (on 20 August) XXII Mountain Corps in Epirus, Greece. The Germans feared an Allied landing in Greece (a belief reinforced by British disinformation measures like Operation Mincemeat), and were engaged in continuous anti-partisan sweeps, during which several hundred villages were depopulated and often torched. Collective punishment of entire localities for guerrilla attacks was common, with directives to execute 50 to 100 hostages for each German casualty; just a few days prior to Lanz assuming command, men of the 98th Regiment of 1st Mountain Division under Lieutenant-Colonel Josef Salminger, an ardent Nazi, had executed 153 civilians in the village of Mousiotitsa and another 317 shortly before in the village of Kommeno.

Lanz himself was often at odds with his new subordinates. A conservative officer of the old school, and a devout Catholic, he had little in common with the energetic and fanatical young officers of the division like Salminger. Compared to some devout Nazi Generals, Lanz was more ambivalent about Hitler; after the failure of the 20 July plot he was said to sleep with a revolver under his pillow. Despite Lanz's personal misgivings and his clashes with his subordinate, General Walter von Stettner, over the treatment of civilians, reprisals remained a standard tactic: following the death of Salminger in a guerrilla ambush in late September, Lanz issued an order demanding "ruthless retaliatory action" in a 20 km area around the place of the ambush. As a result, at least 200 civilians were executed, including 92 in the village of Lingiades alone.

Although these large-scale operations proved to have little permanent effect on the guerrilla groups themselves, the reprisals instilled sufficient terror in the local population to deter cooperation with the guerrillas. Furthermore, in late 1943, pressed by both the Germans and rival leftist ELAS guerrillas, General Napoleon Zervas, the leader of EDES, the dominant guerrilla group in Epirus, reached a tacit agreement with Lanz and restricted his forces' operations against the Germans.

==== Cephalonia and Corfu massacres ====
On 8 September, Italy surrendered to the Allies. This began a race to disarm and intern the Italian garrisons of the Balkans before the Allies could take advantage of it. Lanz was tasked with overcoming the Italian forces in Epirus and the Ionian Islands. In two cases, in Cephalonia and Corfu, the Italians offered resistance. Lanz himself was initially in favour of negotiating the Italian surrender, but in the end followed his orders and stormed these islands. In Cephalonia, the battle raged for a week before the Italians surrendered. After their surrender, and according to a directive from Hitler, more than 5,000 Italians were executed by the Germans. Lanz was present in Cephalonia both during the battle and the subsequent massacre. In Corfu, resistance lasted only for a day, but all 280 Italian officers on the island were shot and their bodies were disposed of in the sea, on Lanz's orders.

=== End of the war ===
After the German retreat from Greece in October 1944, Lanz and his troops moved through the Balkans towards Hungary, where they participated in Operation Margarethe, and the Austrian Alps, where he surrendered to the US Army on 8 May 1945.

== Trial and subsequent life ==
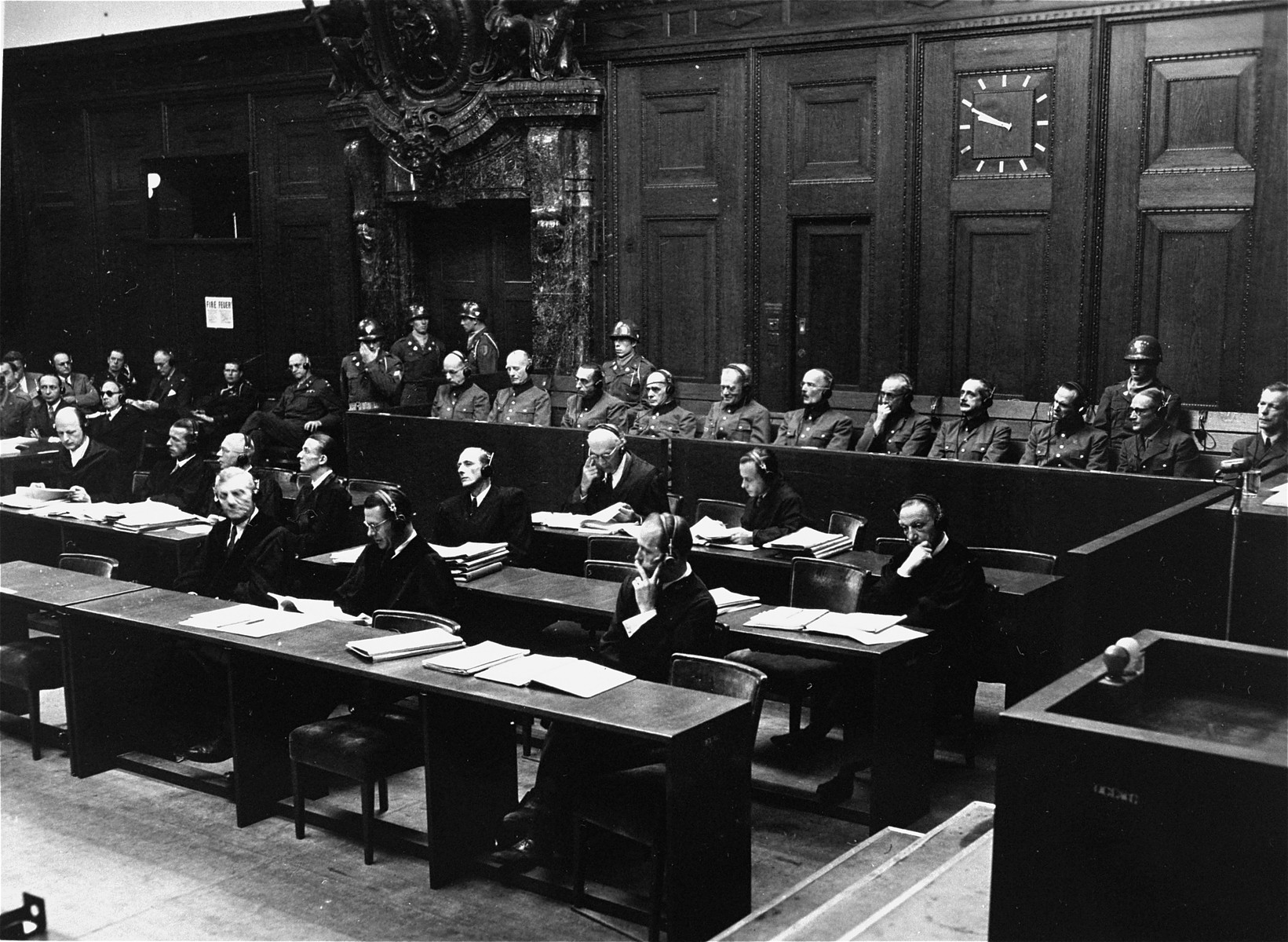
The defendants of the "Southeast Case" in the dock at Nuremberg. Lanz is third from left in the back.

Lanz was brought to trial in 1947 in the so-called "Southeast Case" of the Nuremberg Trials, along with other Wehrmacht generals active in the Balkans. The trial was concerned with the atrocities carried out against civilians and POWs in the area. In Lanz's case, the biggest issue was the Cephalonia massacre. However, his defence team cast doubt on the allegations concerning these events, and as the Italians did not present any evidence against him, Lanz convinced the court that he had resisted Hitler's directives and that the massacre did not happen. He claimed that the report to Army Group E reporting the execution of 5,000 soldiers had been a ruse employed to deceive the Army command, in order to hide the fact that he had disobeyed the Führer’s orders. He added that fewer than a dozen officers were shot and the rest of the Acqui Division was transported to Piraeus through Patras. His defence also argued that the Italians were under no orders to fight from the War Office in Brindisi, and would therefore have to be regarded as mutineers or franc-tireurs who had no right to be treated as POWs under the Geneva conventions.

Lanz was sentenced to 12 years imprisonment, a comparatively light sentence compared with other commanders involved with operations in the Balkans, like Lothar Rendulic. In 1949, two anonymous newspaper reports spread the story that Lanz had secretly plotted to have Hitler arrested in early 1943. No independent evidence is known to support this idea which was likely conceived and spread by supporters of Lanz to have his sentence reduced.

His sentence was reviewed by the "Peck Panel". On 1 February 1951, Lanz was released after his sentence was commuted to time served. To date, he is the only person to have served a prison sentence for the atrocities committed in Epirus or the Ionian islands.

After his release, Lanz became active in the FDP party and served as its adviser on military and security issues. In 1954, he published a book on the history of the 1st Mountain Division. He died in Munich in 1982.

== Awards and decorations ==
- Iron Cross (1914) 1st and 2nd class
- Golden Württemberg Military Merit Medal on 30 August 1915
- Knight's Cross of the Friedrich Order with Swords
- Knight's Cross of the Military Merit Order (Württemberg)
- Military Merit Cross, 3rd class with Swords (Austria-Hungary)
- Wound Badge (1918) in Black
- Order of Vytautas the Great, 5th class (Lithuania) on 8 September 1933
- Clasp to the Iron Cross (1939)
  - 2nd Class (22 May 1940)
  - 1st Class (8 June 1940)
- Knight's Cross of the Iron Cross with Oak Leaves
  - Knight's Cross on 1 October 1940 as an Oberst in the General Staff and Chief of Staff of XVIII. Armeekorps
  - 160th Oak Leaves on 23 December 1942 as a Generalleutnant and commander of the 1. Gebirgs-Division

== See also ==
- Assassination attempts on Adolf Hitler

== Sources and bibliography ==
- (in German) Charles B. Burdick: Hubert Lanz. General der Gebirgstruppe 1896–1982, (= Soldatenschicksale des zwanzigsten Jahrhunderts als Geschichtsquelle, Bd. 9), Osnabrück, 1988, ISBN 3-7648-1736-4
- Fellgiebel, Walther-Peer (2000) [1986]. Die Träger des Ritterkreuzes des Eisernen Kreuzes 1939–1945 — Die Inhaber der höchsten Auszeichnung des Zweiten Weltkrieges aller Wehrmachtteile [The Bearers of the Knight's Cross of the Iron Cross 1939–1945 — The Owners of the Highest Award of the Second World War of all Wehrmacht Branches] (in German). Friedberg, Germany: Podzun-Pallas. ISBN 978-3-7909-0284-6.
- Heer, Hannes; Naumann, Klaus; Shelton, Roy (2000). War of Extermination: The German Military in World War II, 1941–1944. Berghahn Books. ISBN 978-1-57181-493-7.
- Hoffmann, Peter (1996). The History of the German Resistance, 1933–1945. McGill-Queen's Press. ISBN 978-0-7735-1531-4.
- Lamb, Richard (1996). War in Italy, 1943–1945: A Brutal Story. Da Capo Press. ISBN 0-306-80688-6.
- Lanz, Hubert (1954). Gebirgsjäger. Die 1. Gebirgs-Division 1935 – 1945 (in German). Bad Nauheim.
- Mazower, Mark (1995). Inside Hitler's Greece: The Experience of Occupation, 1941–44. United States: Yale University Press. ISBN 0-300-08923-6.
- Meyer, Hermann Frank (1999). Kommeno. Erzählende Rekonstruktion eines Wehrmachtsverbrechens in Griechenland (in German). Köln: Romiosini Verlag. ISBN 3-929889-34-X.
- Meyer, Hermann Frank (2008). Blutiges Edelweiß. Die 1. Gebirgs-Division im Zweiten Weltkrieg (in German). Berlin: Verlag Ch. Links. ISBN 978-3-86153-447-1.
- Scherzer, Veit (2007). Die Ritterkreuzträger 1939–1945 Die Inhaber des Ritterkreuzes des Eisernen Kreuzes 1939 von Heer, Luftwaffe, Kriegsmarine, Waffen-SS, Volkssturm sowie mit Deutschland verbündeter Streitkräfte nach den Unterlagen des Bundesarchives [The Knight's Cross Bearers 1939–1945 The Holders of the Knight's Cross of the Iron Cross 1939 by Army, Air Force, Navy, Waffen-SS, Volkssturm and Allied Forces with Germany According to the Documents of the Federal Archives] (in German). Jena, Germany: Scherzers Militaer-Verlag. ISBN 978-3-938845-17-2.
- Schreiber, Gerhard (1990). Die italienischen Militärinternierten im deutschen Machtbereich 1943 bis 1945. Verraten – Verachtet – Vergessen, (= Beiträge zur Militärgeschichte, Bd. 28) (in German). München. ISBN 3-486-55391-7.
- Steinberg, Jonathan (2002). All Or Nothing: The Axis and the Holocaust, 1941–1943. Routledge. ISBN 978-0-415-29069-2.
- Thomas, Franz; Wegmann, Günter (1994). Die Ritterkreuzträger der Deutschen Wehrmacht 1939–1945 Teil VI: Die Gebirgstruppe Band 2: L–Z [The Knight's Cross Bearers of the German Wehrmacht 1939–1945 Part VI: The Mountain Troops Volume 2: L–Z] (in German). Osnabrück, Germany: Biblio-Verlag. ISBN 978-3-7648-2430-3.
- Thomas, Franz (1998). Die Eichenlaubträger 1939–1945 Band 2: L–Z [The Oak Leaves Bearers 1939–1945 Volume 2: L–Z] (in German). Osnabrück, Germany: Biblio-Verlag. ISBN 978-3-7648-2300-9.

Military offices
Preceded by Generalleutnant Ludwig Kübler	Commander of 1. Gebirgs-Division; October 25, 1940 – December 17, 1942	Succeeded by Generalleutnant Walter von Stettner
Preceded by none (new formation)	Commander of Armeeabteilung Lanz; January 28, 1943 – February 20, 1943	Succeeded by General der Panzertruppe Werner Kempf (Armeeabteilung Kempf)
Preceded by General der Gebirgstruppe Rudolf Konrad	Commander of XXXXIX Gebirgskorps; June 25, 1943 – July 26, 1943	Succeeded by General der Gebirgstruppe Rudolf Konrad
Preceded by none (new formation)	Commander of XXII Gebirgskorps; August 20, 1943 – May 8, 1945	Succeeded by none (German capitulation)
