= Smyrtia =

Smyrtia Σμυρτιά
- Community
- Location within Greece
- Coordinates: 39°26′N 20°45′E
- Country: Greece
- Administrative region: Epirus
- Regional unit: Ioannina
- Municipality: Dodoni
- Municipal unit: Lakka Souliou

Population (2021)
  - Community: 32
- Time zone: UTC+2 (EET)
  - Summer (DST): UTC+3 (EEST)

Smyrtia (Greek: Σμυρτιά), is a small village of about 50 people, in the municipal unit of Lakka Souliou. It belongs to the municipality of Dodoni in northern Greece. It is situated between two main towns of the area Derviziana (Δερβίζιανα) and Elafos (Έλαφος). Its name in Greek is a plant, Myrtia (Smyrtia, Myrtus communis).
