= Mousiotitsa =

Mousiotitsa Μουσιωτίτσα
- Community
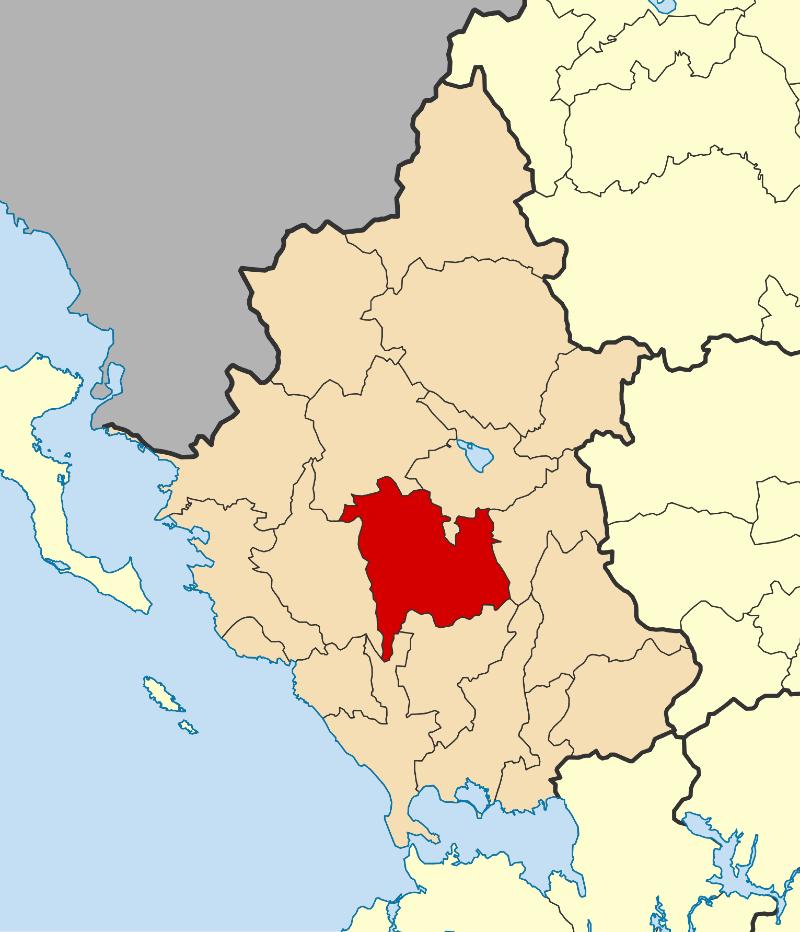

- Location within Greece
- Coordinates: 39°23′N 20°49′E
- Country: Greece
- Administrative region: Epirus
- Regional unit: Ioannina
- Municipality: Dodoni
- Municipal unit: Agios Dimitrios
- Elevation: 650 m (2,130 ft)

Population (2021)
  - Community: 468
- Time zone: UTC+2 (EET)
  - Summer (DST): UTC+3 (EEST)
- Postal code: 45500
- Area code: 02564

Mousiotitsa (Greek: Μουσιωτίτσα) or Kato Mousiotitsa (Greek: Κάτω Μουσιωτίτσα) is a village located in the Ioannina regional unit in the Epirus region (Greek: Ήπειρος) of western Greece. Situated 33 km (21 mi) south of the city of Ioannina (Greek: Ιωάννινα) near the springs of the river Louros (Greek: ποταμός Λούρος), the village consists of 4 areas: Kato Mousiotitsa (Greek: Κάτω Μουσιωτίτσα), Ano Mousiotitsa (Greek: Άνω Μουσιωτίτσα), Nea Mousiotitsa (Greek: Νέα Μουσιωτίτσα) and Mesoura (Greek: Μεσούρα). It is surrounded by 5 mountains: Bitera (Greek: Μπιτέρα), Spithari (Greek: Σπιθάρι), Pourizi (Greek: Πουρίζι), Kalogeritsa (Greek: Καλογερίτσα) and Katafi (Greek: Καταφή).

The village has a permanent population of 468 (2021 census), however, in the summer months the numbers can soar past 1000 as expatriates return from abroad (e.g. Sweden, Germany, USA, Canada) and from Athens and other larger cities.

Since 2011 the village belongs to the municipality of Dodoni (Greek: Δωδώνη) after the merger of its previous municipal unit Agios Dimitrios (Greek: Άγιος Δημήτριος) with three other units.

== Name ==
The toponym Mousiotitsa is formed from the Slavic personal name Myšota from myš-ъ meaning 'mouse' and the ending -ota, alongside the patronymic suffix -išt stemming from itj. In the toponym, the Slavic y sound became i, a change present among South Slavic languages and later the i turned into u in Greek, due to the influence of the neighbouring labial consonant through labialisation. The original placename suffix -išta was later replaced by the suffix -ica, a frequent and familiar form to Greek speakers. The linguist Kostas Oikonomou stated the spelling variant of the placename Μουσιωτίτσα (Mousiotitsa) with an omega ω (o) originated from a false etymology influenced by demonyms ending in ιώτισσα (iotissa).

== History ==
=== Initial settlement ===
It is widely regarded to have been settled in the early 18th century. The old St. Nicholas church is first mentioned in the Greek church archives in the year 1791, however, its construction is dated at around 1770. One of the oldest houses still remaining is dated at 1750. Its first inhabitants are believed to have been Klephts (Greek: κλέφτες) and other refugees fleeing from Ottoman oppression or persecution. The shape of the geographical surroundings shielded the village and its inhabitants from view, thus providing a safe place to dwell.

The village is believed to have belonged to the group of villages that made up the Souli (Greek: Σούλι) mountain settlements. This belief is supported by the fact that local names resemble common Souliot names, alongside knowledge of Arvanitika (Greek: αρβανίτικα, "Albanian") among village elders - a language commonly spoken amongst Souliot. As late as 1880, Mousiotitsa is described by Greek sources of that era (Labridis) as one of the exclusively Albanian-speaking villages of Tsarkovista (today Dodoni). It was part of an Albanian-speaking enclave of villages (including Zermi, Krania, Papadates, Rousatsa, Derviziana, Mousiotitsa) in the upper Acheron region. From the mid 19th century the use of Greek was increasing and Albanian declining in the region.

=== World War II Massacres ===
On July 25, 1943 members of the 98. Regiment of the 1st Mountain Division entered the village and executed 136 civilians after the village was picked for a punitive attack by Feldpolizeiinspektor Paul Härtel. The attack and resulting massacre was seen as retaliation by the Nazi German troops against alleged resistance activity in the village. A second assault was carried out by the same German unit on August 27, 1943. This was in reprisal for a deadly attack on a German officer in the nearby area of Zita, and resulted in 17 more locals being murdered, raising the total number of victims to 153.

=== 21st century ===
Kostas Oikonomou (2002) described Ano and Kato Mousiotitsa as Arvanite speaking villages. In the early 21st century, Arvanitika could be heard from time to time in Mousiotitsa. Elderly people were bilingual in the community language and Greek, whereas younger residents under 40 might have understood the community language but did not use it.

== See also ==
- List of settlements in the Ioannina regional unit
- List of massacres in Greece

== Sources ==
- Baltsiotis, Lambros (2009). The Muslim Chams from their entry into the Greek state until the start of the Greco-Italian war (1913-1940): the story of a community from millet to nation [Οι μουσουλμάνοι Τσάμηδες από την είσοδό τους στο ελληνικό κράτος μέχρι την έναρξη του ελληνοϊταλικού πολέμου (1913-1940): η ιστορία μιας κοινότητας από το millet στο έθνος] (Thesis). University of Panteion.
- Kokolakis, Mihalis (2003). Το ύστερο Γιαννιώτικο Πασαλίκι: χώρος, διοίκηση και πληθυσμός στην τουρκοκρατούμενη Ηπειρο (1820–1913) [The Late Pashalik of Ioannina: Space, Administration and Population in Ottoman-ruled Epirus (1820–1913)] (in Greek). Athens, Greece: EIE-ΚΝΕ. ISBN 978-960-7916-11-2.
- Oikonomou, Kostas E. (2002). Τα οικωνύμια του νομού Ιωαννίνων. Γλωσσολογική εξέταση [The oikonyms of the prefecture of Ioannina. A linguistic examination] (PDF) (in Greek). Nomarchiaki Aftodioikisi Ioanninon. ISBN 9789608316010. Archived (PDF) from the original on 25 November 2024.
