= Ravenia =

Ravenia Ραβένια
- Community
- Location within Greece
- Coordinates: 39°29′N 20°55′E
- Country: Greece
- Administrative region: Epirus
- Regional unit: Ioannina
- Municipality: Dodoni
- Municipal unit: Agios Dimitrios

Population (2021)
  - Community: 62
- Time zone: UTC+2 (EET)
  - Summer (DST): UTC+3 (EEST)
- Vehicle registration: ΙΝ

Ravenia (Greek: Ραβένια) is a village of Epirus, Greece located 26 km south of Ioannina at an altitude of 844 m. It belongs to the municipality of Dodoni.

It belongs to a group of villages called Katsaounochoria (Κατσαουνοχώρια).

== Population ==
Historical population
Year	Pop.	±%
1981	174	—
1991	135	−22.4%
2001	107	−20.7%
2011	106	−0.9%
2021	62	−41.5%

== History ==
The settlement changed location twice. During the Byzantine Era, the population moved from the location Langada Eklissias (Λαγκάδα Εκκλησίας) and resettled to the area of Bogdora (Μπογδορά). According to oral tradition, the resettlement was made due to geological changes. After an earthquake the mountain water springs ceased as the water found other subterranean paths towards the Arachthos river.

During the beginning of the Turkish period, the settlement was moved to its current location next to the monastery of 'Koimisis tis Theotokou' and one of the incentives for the relocation must have been the nearby mountain water spring. The monastery drew the Christian population of the surrounding area and thrived between the 15th-18th centuries.

During the sixteenth century a large proportion of the male population emigrated to Moldovlachia, Moldova and Valachia, for economic reasons and had left their families in Ravenia. Due to some tragic incident between the Muslim Albanian insurgents and the families left behind, the men returned and took their families with them. Their destination is unknown today. According to oral tradition eighty seles left. Sela means saddle and one family was represented by one saddle.

The first primary school was built in 1901 with the help of a local educated man. Georgios Gkazianis had studied in Constantinople. Gkazianis raised money amongst the Greek population of Ioannina and Istanbul.

The village was burnt down by the Turks during the Balkan Wars in 1910. The residents fled south to Filippiada which was already in the hands of the Greek Army. The Greek Army set camp for a short period of time in Ravenia and fought some skirmishes against the Turks in the surrounding rugged mountainous area before it moved ahead for the last battle in Bizani and the siege of Ioannina. Ravenia became part of Greece in 1911.

In 1943 the village was burnt down by the Italian occupation forces of Mussolini and the inhabitants had to flee one more time to the peaks of Mount Xerovouni and neighbouring villages where they had family ties.

After World War II and the Greek Civil War, the school was reopened and remained open until 1982. The population decreased as the younger inhabitants left for a better life in the nearby town of Ioannina, Athens and abroad. Ravenia was connected to the national grid in 1964 and the town water system in 1967. The entire water system was renovated in 2010. The dirt track connecting the village to the National road was sealed with asphalt in 1987.

Only 5 families (62 people) actively live in Ravenia as of the 2021 Greek Census.

== See also ==
- List of settlements in the Ioannina regional unit
