= Walter Stettner Ritter von Grabenhofen =

German general (1895–1944)

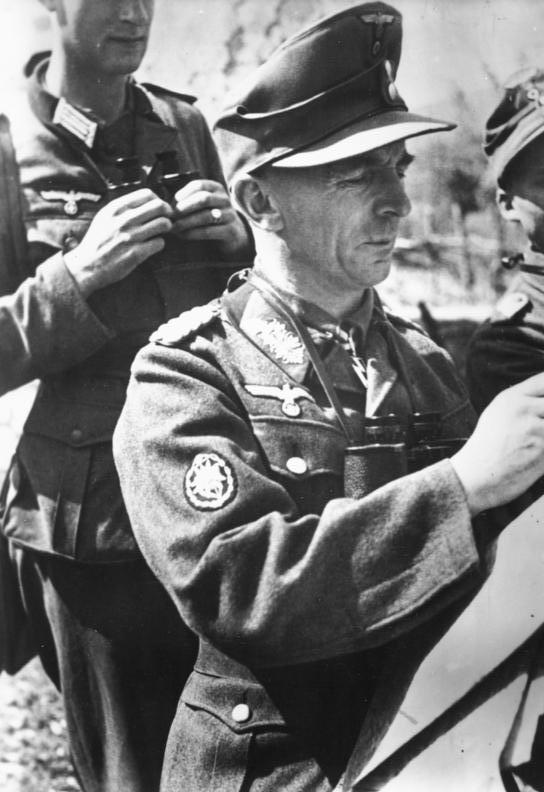
- Stettner in 1943
- Born: 19 March 1895; Munich, German Empire
- Died: 18 October 1944 (aged 49); MIA on Mount Avala near Belgrade, German-occupied Serbia
- Military career
- Allegiance: German Empire; Weimar Republic; Nazi Germany
- Branch: Army (Wehrmacht)
- Service years: 1914–1920; 1935–1945
- Rank: Generalleutnant
- Unit: 1st Mountain Division
- Conflicts: World War I; World War II; Battle of the Caucasus; World War II in Yugoslavia; Belgrade Offensive

Walter Stettner Ritter von Grabenhofen (18 March 1895 – 18 October 1944) was a German general in the Wehrmacht during World War II and a recipient of the Knight's Cross of the Iron Cross. In October 1944 he went missing in action on Mount Avala, near Belgrade in Serbia.

== Biography ==
General von Stettner came from a well-respected military family. He fought in World War I, serving with the Bavarian Leib Regiment throughout.

He started World War II as commander of a Gebirgsjäger-Regiment and fought in Poland, Norway, Yugoslavia, and the Soviet Union, where his unit advanced into the Caucasus. On 17 December 1942, he replaced Hubert Lanz as commander of the 1st Mountain Division, when the Division was retreating to the Kuban Bridgehead, and in April 1943 he was awarded the Knight's Cross of the Iron Cross for his contribution to the defence of the Bridgehead.

In April 1943, the 1st Mountain Division was transferred to Yugoslavia for anti-partisan operations. Still under Stettner's command, the division committed several war crimes in Yugoslavia and Greece, including the Massacres of Kommeno, Mousiotitsa, Lyngiades, Borovë and the Massacre of the Italian Acqui Division.

== Disappearance and aftermath ==
In October 1944, during the Soviet Belgrade Offensive, his unit was cut off and Stettner went missing in action, presumed killed on Mount Avala, near Belgrade.

He was described as a "small, meticulous man, who suffered a complex of inferiority and was driven by a tremendous sense of pride that led him to keep political opinions to himself. From his soldiers, he expected unwavering obedience to Hitler's orders. He dismissed the role of the military chaplaincy in the 1st Mountain Division. In the guidelines released for Operation "Augustus", Stettner required his soldiers to shoot on the spot any suspect who could potentially be connected to or suspected of partisan activities and to destroy all houses in their vicinity. This way of treating civilians in Epirus led to frequent frictions with his immediate superior, the devout Catholic General Hubert Lanz".

== See also ==
- List of people who disappeared

== Sources ==
- This article is based on the one in German Wikipedia, Walter Stettner Ritter von Grabenhofen.

Military offices
Preceded by Generalmajor Hubert Lanz	Commander of 1. Gebirgs Division; 17 December 1942 – 18 October 1944	Succeeded by Generalmajor August Wittmann
