= Seriziana =

Lakka Souliou, Ioannina small mountain village

Seriziana Σεριζιανά
- Community
- Location within Greece
- Coordinates: 39°18′N 20°41′E
- Country: Greece
- Administrative region: Epirus
- Regional unit: Ioannina
- Municipality: Dodoni
- Municipal unit: Lakka Souliou

Population (2021)
  - Community: 67
- Time zone: UTC+2 (EET)
  - Summer (DST): UTC+3 (EEST)

Seriziana (Greek: Σεριζιανά) is a small mountain village in the north-western Greece (500 meters above the sea level). It is part of the Lakka Souliou municipal unit in the municipality of Dodoni, Ioannina regional unit.

At its foot, the river Acheron passes by. In the ancient times, it is exactly the place that ancient Greeks believed that the doors to Hades were located. Some people tried to pass that location via canoe-kayak in the recent times and some found death, as at this specific place the river becomes very dangerous.
