= Episkopiko =

Episkopiko Επισκοπικό
- Community
- Location within Greece
- Coordinates: 39°32′22″N 20°51′17″E
- Country: Greece
- Administrative region: Epirus
- Regional unit: Ioannina
- Municipality: Dodoni
- Municipal unit: Agios Dimitrios

Population (2021)
  - Community: 272
- Time zone: UTC+2 (EET)
  - Summer (DST): UTC+3 (EEST)

Episkopiko (Greek: Επισκοπικό, before 1928: Μπάρτζι - Bartzi) is a village in northwest Greece near the city of Ioannina. Since 2010, it is part of the municipality Dodoni. The village was referred by the English historian William Martin Leake, in 1805.
