= Albrecht Lanz =

Major Albrecht Lanz
- Born: 25 February 1898; Entringen, Germany
- Died: 27 January 1942 (aged 43); Lazerett Smolensk, Soviet Union
- Relatives: Hubert Lanz (brother)
- Military career
- Allegiance: Germany
- Branch: German Army
- Rank: Oberstleutnant
- Commands: Infantry Regiment 396
- Conflicts: World War II; Battle of the Lys; Occupation of the Channel Islands; Eastern Front
- Awards: Knight's Cross of the Iron Cross

Major Albrecht Lanz (25 February 1898 – 27 January 1942) was the first Kommandant of Guernsey and Jersey in the Channel Islands in World War II and a recipient of the Knight's Cross of the Iron Cross.

== Early life ==
Lanz was born on 25 February 1898, in Entringen in the Kingdom of Württemberg of the German Empire.

== Career ==
"Now came a moment that I shall never in my life forget. Easily the proudest of this war [...] the old gentleman bowed deeply before the representatives of the German Army. The first time in the history of England that a Governor had the direct representative of his Britannic Majesty has ever bowed to the German Army."

— Book by Barry Turner

On 1 June 1940, Lanz arrived at Guernsey Airport with the Luftwaffe, as part of an attempt to discover the level of military preparedness of the islands (though they had been demilitarised, the information was kept secret until 28 June). Upon his arrival with his interpreter Major Maass. Lanz states that the moment command was transferred to him was "the proudest in this war". When Lanz went to Sark on 3 July to see Dame Sybil Hathaway, she noted that "Lanz was a tall, alert, quick-spoken officer, with dark hair and dark eyes. In civilian life he had been a Doctor of both Law and Philosophy, and I believe he came from a family of agricultural machinery manufacturers in Stuttgart [...] a fair minded man who would never trick anyone by low cunning". Ambrose Sherwill stated that he was "every inch a soldier and not very easy to get to know but absolutely straight and kindly".

Lanz was given a Knight's Cross of the Iron Cross on 4 September 1940. It was noted in Die Wehrmacht in 1940, and an American military translation revealed the following. Whilst the German forces were attacking Belgium, specifically during the crossing of the River Lys, around Theilt (potentially Thielt). The battalion was attempting to attack Gothem, a village, on the 24 May 1940, but beaten back. The battalion again tried on the 26 May through grain fields with limited visibility due to the grain, and under enemy fire, the attack was failing. Lanz organised the group and they attacked successfully, taking several enemies prisoner.

However, he left the post at the rank of Oberstleutnant and later transferred to the Eastern Front. There, it was stated of Lanz and his regiment, the 396th Infantry Regiment, "I envy the men under this wonderful leader and person. He's a man who has intelligence written all over his tanned face, which is full of humour. He has a kind word or a joke for everyone". He died on the Eastern Front on the 27 January 1942 at Lazerett in Smolensk, Soviet Union in hospital of wounds he sustained.

== Awards ==
- Knight's Cross of the Iron Cross on 4 September 1940 as Major and commander of the I./Infanterie-Regiment 396
