= Massacres of Mousiotitsa =

Mass-killings in Mousiotitsa, Nazi-occupied Greece

- Location: 39°23′N 20°49′E; Mousiotitsa, Greece (under German occupation)
- Date: 25 July and 27 August 1943
- Target: Population of the village
- Attack type: Mass murder, looting, arson
- Weapons: machine guns, hand-grenades and rifles
- Deaths: 153
- Perpetrators: Walter Stettner, Josef Salminger: 98th Regiment of the 1st Mountain Division
- Motive: Reprisals for the participation in the Greek Resistance

The Massacres of Mousiotitsa (Greek: Οι σφαγές της Μουσιωτίτσας; German: Massaker von Mousiotitsa) refer to Nazi war crimes perpetrated in the summer of 1943 by soldiers of the 1st Mountain Division in the village of Mousiotitsa, Greece, during its occupation by the Axis in World War II. Mousiotitsa endured two assaults by the same German unit, separated by a one-month period. The first took place on 25 July and the second on 27 August 1943.

== Background ==
=== Geography ===
The village of Mousiotitsa is situated 33 km south of the city of Ioannina and 55 km northwest of Arta in the Epirus region. It is located on the east slopes of Mt. Tomaros, near the springs of the Louros river. Mousiotitsa consists of two distinct neighborhoods that are two kilometers apart (i.e., Ano and Kato Mousiotitsa). According to the 1940 Greek census, the village had 816 residents who were engaged in free-range livestock farming and subsistence agriculture.

=== 1st Mountain Division transfer to Epirus ===
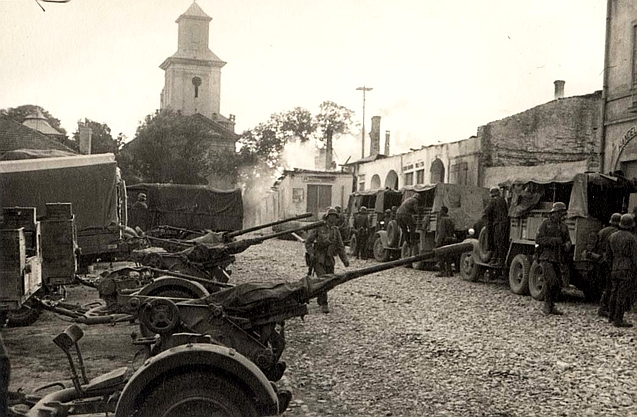
The 98th Regiment of the 1st Mt Division during the invasion of Poland, 1939

After the defeat of the Axis in North Africa, the Wehrmacht feared an Allied amphibious landing in western Greece. Hence, in June 1943 the elite 1st Mountain Division Edelweiss was transferred to Epirus from the Caucasus. Under the command of Generalleutnant Walter Stettner, the Division was tasked with countering partisan activity and was given explicit orders to act with extreme brutality. Since partisans relied upon civilians for food and intelligence, the Wehrmacht systematically used mass reprisals to terrorize local communities, labeling their population as "bandits". On 7 July 1943, Stettner issued an order stipulating that villages deemed to be of use to partisans should be wiped out and their population executed or deported. Many Division personnel, having previously fought on the Eastern Front, were accustomed to carrying out ruthless reprisals against local populations. Mousiotitsa was the first victim of a series of mop-up operations that in the coming months would result in the deaths of hundreds of civilians and the destruction of their property in villages such as Kommeno and Lingiades.

=== July 1943 in Mousiotitsa ===
By the summer of 1943, villagers from Mousiotitsa had joined the armed bands of the EDES partisan organization which harassed the German occupation forces. Soon after the arrival in the region of the 1st Mountain Division, reports of the presence of partisans west of the Arta - Ioannina road reached its headquarters. On 18 July, a force commanded by Oberst Josef Salminger advanced south towards Arta and clashed with partisans near Kopani, leaving behind 9 dead Germans. This engagement prompted Salminger to request an even harsher stance in dealing with the locals, which was ultimately approved by Stettner and hence Mousiotitsa was targeted. On 24 July, leaflets were thrown above Mousiotitsa from a low-flying German aircraft, demanding residents to refrain from abandoning their homes.

== First massacre (25 July) ==
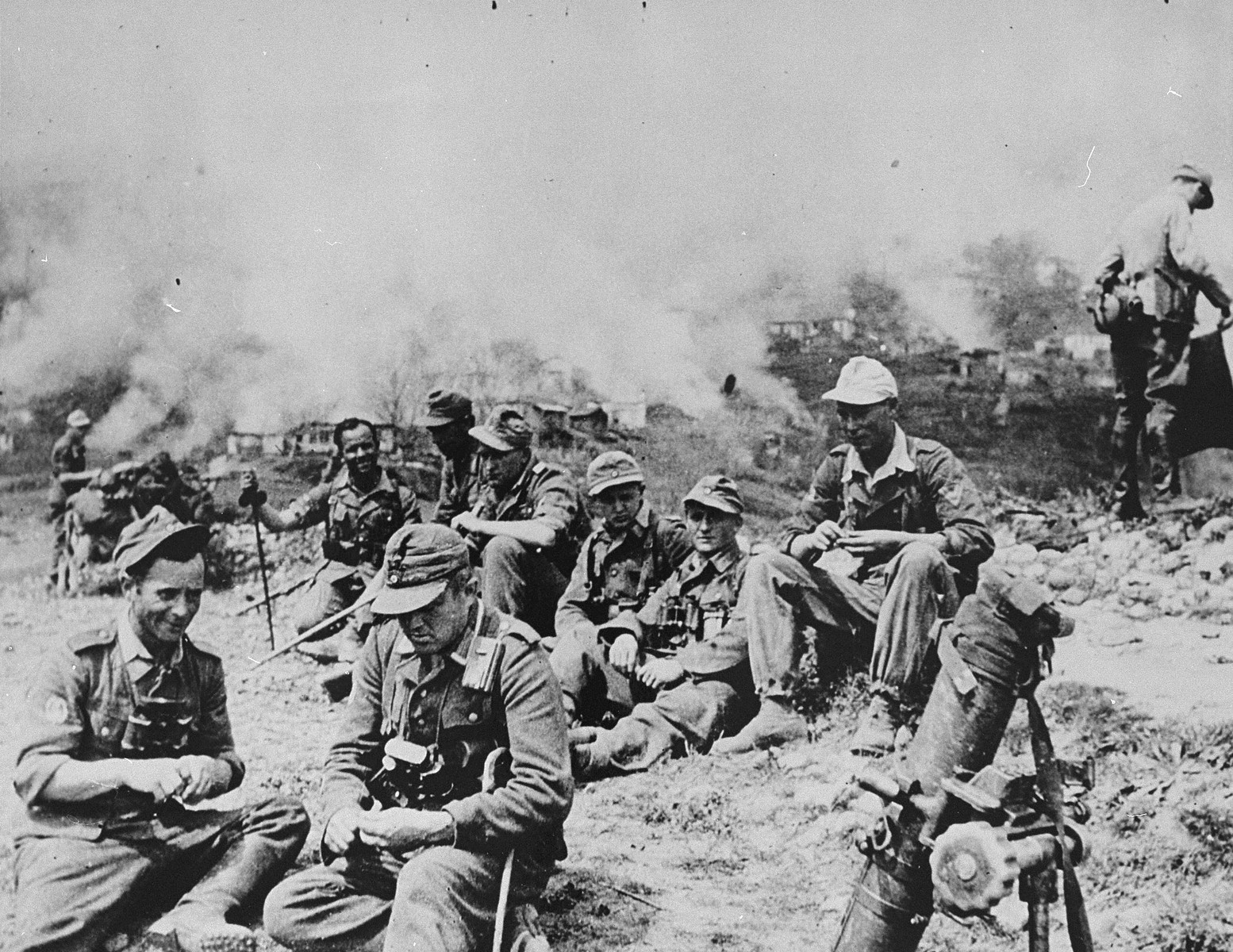
German mountain troops after destroying a village in Epirus

On Sunday 25 July, a coordinated attack was initiated by troops of the 98th Regiment of the 1st Mountain Division. Transported to Mousiotitsa on lorries, the troops were divided into four distinct groups. Oberleutnant Willibald Röser, known by the nickname "Nero of 12/98", commanded one group from the 12th Company. By encircling the village, the four groups blocked all exits and attacked the village from different directions on its periphery. During their sweeps, they captured hostages and burnt homes after looting them. The hostages were mustered in Spithari (Greek: Σπιθάρι), a plateau above the village that had served as a refuge for locals during the era of Ottoman rule. In the late afternoon, the hostages were lined up and executed with machine guns. A total of 136 civilians were killed. Due to the scarcity of men able of digging graves, the bodies of those killed at Spithari were subsequently interred in a dry well.

== Second massacre (27 August) ==
A second attack on Mousiotitsa was carried out on 27 August 1943 in reprisal for the killing of a German officer by partisans near the village. In this second attack, which was again carried out by the 98th Regiment, an additional 17 individuals who were members of two families assisting the partisans with cooking were murdered.

== Aftermath ==
The combined list of casualties from the two attacks on Mousiotitsa totals 153 individuals, among which 63 children under the age of 16. The German troops did not encounter any partisans nor any resistance in Mousiotitsa. Their official report about the events claimed that a platoon of the 12th Company led by Willibald Röser was fired upon from a detached dwelling. The building was surrounded and destroyed along with "100 bandits". The credibility of this report is disputed.

Salminger was killed in an ambush by partisans on 1 October 1943. To retaliate his death, German forces of the 1st Mountain Division attacked Lingiades on 3 October 1943 killing 92 civilians.

Röser was killed in November 1944 in Freiburg during an airstrike. Stettner went missing after mid-October 1944 near Belgrade.

Monuments commemorating the massacres have been erected in Spithari and the village itself. In remembrance of the massacres, Mousiotitsa has been declared a martyred village (Presidential Decree 399, ΦΕΚ Α 277/16.12.1998).

No reparations were paid to the families of the victims.

== See also ==
- Massacre of Kommeno
- Lyngiades massacre
- Massacre of Kalavryta
- Distomo massacre
- Viannos massacres
- Holocaust of Kedros
- War crimes of the Wehrmacht
