= Lakka Souliou =

Lakka Souliou Λάκκα Σουλίου
- Municipal unit
- Location within the regional unit

- Location within Greece
- Coordinates: 39°24′N 20°47′E
- Country: Greece
- Administrative region: Epirus
- Regional unit: Ioannina
- Municipality: Dodoni
- Districts: 14

Area
  - Municipal unit: 158.578 km^{2} (61.227 sq mi)

Population (2021)
  - Municipal unit: 1,897
  - Municipal unit density: 11.96/km^{2} (30.98/sq mi)
- Time zone: UTC+2 (EET)
  - Summer (DST): UTC+3 (EEST)
- Area code: 26540
- Website: www.lakkasouliou.gr

Lakka Souliou (Greek: Λάκκα Σουλίου) is a former municipality in the Ioannina regional unit, Epirus, Greece. Since the 2011 local government reform it is part of the municipality Dodoni, of which it is a municipal unit. The municipal unit has an area of 158.578 km^{2}. Its population was 1,897 according to the census of 2021. Lakka Souliou is a historical site in the wider area of Souli.

== History ==
=== Ancient times ===
Lakka Souliou has been inhabited since the Neolithic period, as it is testified by the fossils which were found in the region, like axes made of granite and flint, coppery and iron weapons, vessels of clay as well. There are traces of Pelasgic walls in many places of the region, like in Achladea, Bestia, Sistrouni, Alepochori and Paleochori Botsari. In addition to these, there are several acropoleis, ancient boxy tombs and coins of the ancient Epirotes found throughout Lakka Souliou. It is supposed that the plains of the region were covered by sea about 500 million years ago.

Homer mentions that the first historical people who inhabited the region were the Pelasgians in the early 3rd millennium BC, while several Greek tribes started to migrate there from Thessaly in the early 2nd millennium BC, among which the Selloi, Chaonians, Thesprotians and Molossians were included. The Thesprotians dominated upon the other tribes and they expanded eastward from their initial settlement, to the Epirus coastline and present-day Lakka Souliou was included in their possession.

In the 5th century BC, the Molossians began to strengthen and under the reign of Tharrhypas, in 429 BC, they overrode and definitely fended the Thesprotians from the region. During the reign of Tharrypas and his son Alcetas I (390 - 370 BC), the Molossians founded the Molossian League, in 385 BC, with the joining of the Chaonians and Thesprotians. That league grew to be the Epirote League in 325 BC, part of which was the region of Lakka Souliou.

The Epirotes made a treaty with Macedon and their alliance was cemented in 357 BC with the marriage of the Macedonian basileus, Philip II, to Olympias, the daughter of the basileus of Epirus, Neoptolemus I. In 286 BC, the kingdom of Epirus took control over the kingdom of Macedonia, and it expanded later to the west, in Magna Græcia, under the leadership of Pyrrhus. In the struggle of Rome against Macedon, Epirus was an alliant of the latter, but both were defeated in the battle of Pydna in 168 BC. In the same year the Roman general, Lucius Aemilius Paulus Macedonicus, ordered the sacking of 70 epirote towns, among them several towns of modern Lakka Souli, and 150,000 people were enslaved or killed. Epirus was left to bankruptcy and led to decline.

=== Byzantine era and Ottoman rule ===
During the Byzantine times, the region of Lakka Souli was part of the Byzantine Empire and saw several raids against it of foreign tribes. After the Fourth Crusade and the capture of Constantinople in 1204, it became part of the Despotate of Epirus.

In 1449, the region and whole Epirus came under the Ottoman rule. It is then that the inhabitants of the Souli area, the famous Souliotes began the ceaseless struggle against the Ottoman Turks and later, around 1600, they formed the Souliote Confederation, an autonomous confederacy dominating a large number of neighbouring villages in the remote mountainous areas of Epirus, where they could successfully resist Ottoman rule. In 1611, a peasant revolt led by Dionysius the Philosopher came close to the liberation of Ioannina. In that revolt the Lakkiotes are recorded to have taken part.

During the attacks of the Ottomans against Souli in 1732 - 1778 and 1792–1803, Lakka Souli was the "watchtower" of the Souliotes, so as Ali Pasha wanted to occupy this place because of its strategical location. After the Fall of Souli, Ali Pasha gave some lands of the region to squires: Alepochori Botsari, Paleochori Botsari and Romano to Jamali Aga and Acladea to P. Sakellariou, while Georgani and Derviziana remained in the state of Ali Pasha until his death. Epirus was finally liberated in 1913.

=== After 1913 ===
In the Greco-Turkish War (1919-1922) many Lakkiotes took part and were honored for their bravery. In 1940, the Lakkiotes were also involved in the war against the Axis powers, the defeat of the invasion of Benito Mussolini's forces to Greece and the pushing of them back to Albania, in World War II, and they fought along with Napoleon Zervas against Nazi Germany, while Lakka Souli suffered a lot during the Axis occupation of Greece.

== Municipality ==
At the 1997 Kapodistrias reform, the municipality Derviziana was formed out of 14 previously independent communities. The seat of the municipality was the village Derviziana. In 2003, this municipality was renamed to Lakka Souliou. At the 2010 Kallikratis reform, the municipality Lakka Souliou was merged into the municipality Dodoni, of which it became a municipal unit.

The communities of the municipal unit Lakka Souliou are:

- Achladies
- Alepochori
- Ardosi
- Bestia
- Derviziana
- Elafos
- Georganoi
- Palaiochori
- Pentolakkos
- Romanos
- Seriziana
- Sistrouni
- Smyrtia
- Vargiades
