= Agios Dimitrios, Ioannina =

Agios Dimitrios Άγιος Δημήτριος
- Municipal unit
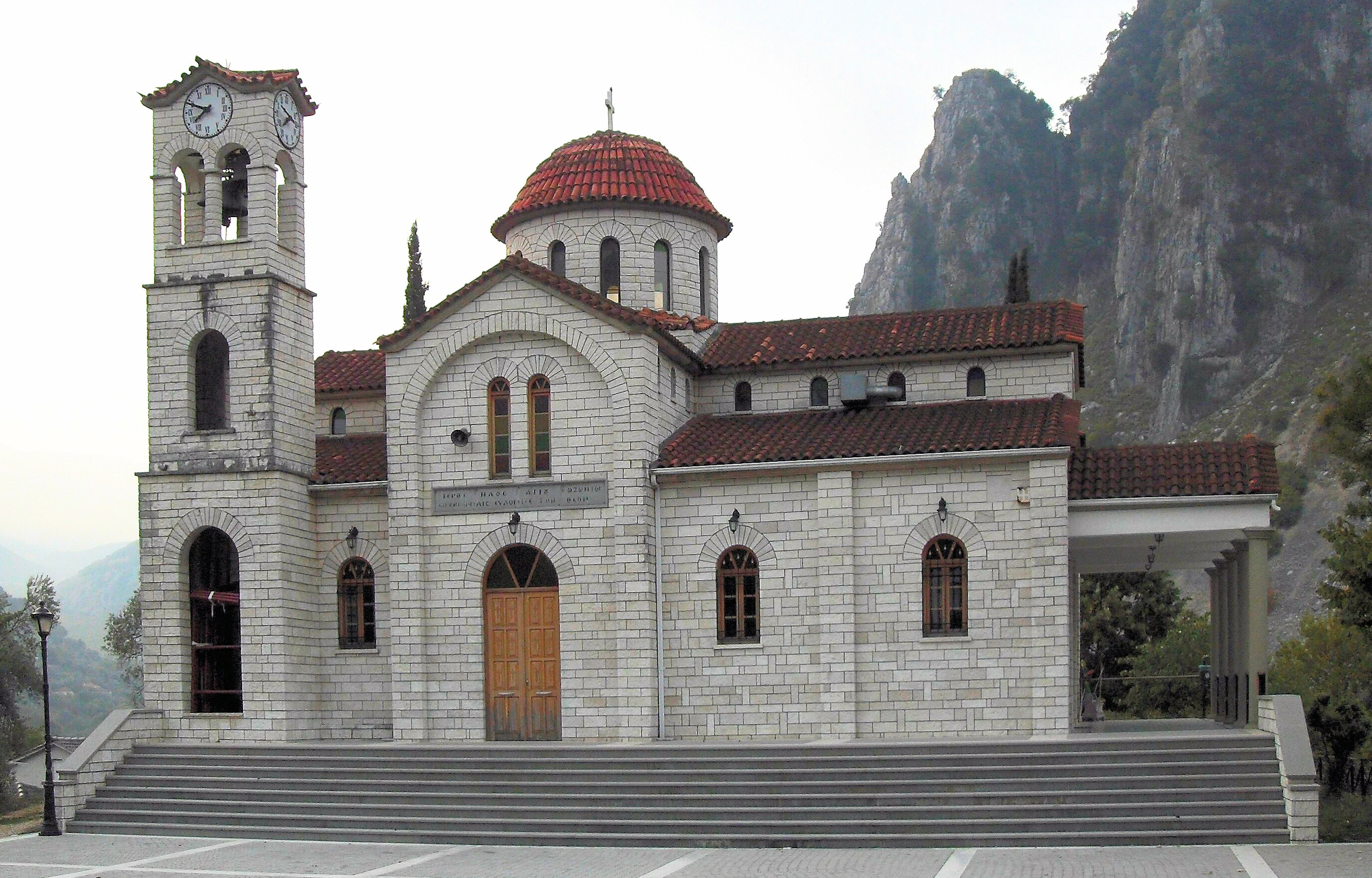
- Kouklesi church

- Location within the regional unit

- Location within Greece
- Coordinates: 39°27′N 20°53′E
- Country: Greece
- Administrative region: Epirus
- Regional unit: Ioannina
- Municipality: Dodoni

Area
  - Municipal unit: 231.473 km^{2} (89.372 sq mi)

Population (2021)
  - Municipal unit: 3,277
  - Municipal unit density: 14.16/km^{2} (36.67/sq mi)
- Time zone: UTC+2 (EET)
  - Summer (DST): UTC+3 (EEST)
- Vehicle registration: ΙΝ

Agios Dimitrios (Greek: Άγιος Δημήτριος) is a former municipality in the Ioannina regional unit, Epirus, Greece. Since the 2011 local government reform it is part of the municipality Dodoni, of which it is a municipal unit. Population 3,277 (2021), its area is 231.473 km². The seat of the municipality was in Theriakisi. The largest village is Kato Mousiotitsa which has a school, gymnasium and lyceum. The municipal unit covers the northwestern part of the Xerovouni mountains.

== Subdivisions ==
The municipal unit Agios Dimitrios is subdivided into the following communities (constituent villages in brackets):

- Agia Triada
- Avgo
- Episkopiko
- Kopani
- Kouklesi (Kouklesi, Potamia)
- Kryfovo (Kryfovo, Kato Kryfovo)
- Melia (Melia, Agia Paraskevi, Lagkiotissa)
- Mousiotitsa (Nea Mousiotitsa, Ano Mousiotitsa, Kato Mousiotitsa, Mesoura)
- Myrodafni
- Perdika (Perdika, Vasaiika)
- Pesta
- Ravenia
- Serviana (Serviana, Molyvadia, Taxiarchis)
- Sklivani (Sklivani, Agios Georgios, Agios Christoforos, Koulouraiika, Profitis Ilias, Rachi, Stavros, Chora)
- Terovo (Terovo, Rapsaioi, Chani Terovou)
- Theriakisi (Theriakisi, Agia Kyriaki, Eisodia Theotokou, Kanneta)
- Varlaam
- Vouliasta

== Population ==
Historical population
Year	Pop.	±%
1991	6,019	—
2001	5,488	−8.8%
2011	4,566	−16.8%
2021	3,277	−28.2%
