= 1st Mountain Division (Wehrmacht) =

WWII German division

- 1. Gebirgs-Division
- Active: 1938–1945
- Country: Nazi Germany
- Branch: German Army
- Type: Gebirgsjäger
- Role: Mountain warfare
- Size: Division
- Garrison/HQ: Garmisch-Partenkirchen
- Engagements: World War II

Insignia
- Identification symbol: Edelweiss

The 1st Mountain Division (German: 1. Gebirgs-Division) was an elite formation of the German Wehrmacht during World War II, and is remembered for its involvement in multiple large-scale war crimes and the propaganda climb to the summit of Mount Elbrus in August 1942. It was created on 9 April 1938 in Garmisch Partenkirchen from the Mountain Brigade (German: Gebirgs Brigade) which was itself formed on 1 June 1935.

== Poland and France ==
The 1st Mountain Division fought in the invasion of Poland in September 1939 as a part of Army Group South and distinguished itself during fighting in the Carpathians and at Lwów. On 8 September 1939 in the village of Rozdziel its soldiers committed a war crime (killing six civilians and three prisoners of war and burning houses) and attempting to execute another 250 civilians.

It subsequently took part in the Battle of France as a part of XVIII Army Corps in May–June 1940 and was selected to take part in the planned operations against the United Kingdom (Operation Sea Lion) and Gibraltar (Operation Felix) but both operations were cancelled. With Felix cancelled, the division took part in the Invasion of Yugoslavia in April 1941 as part of the 2nd Army.

== Eastern Front and Balkans ==
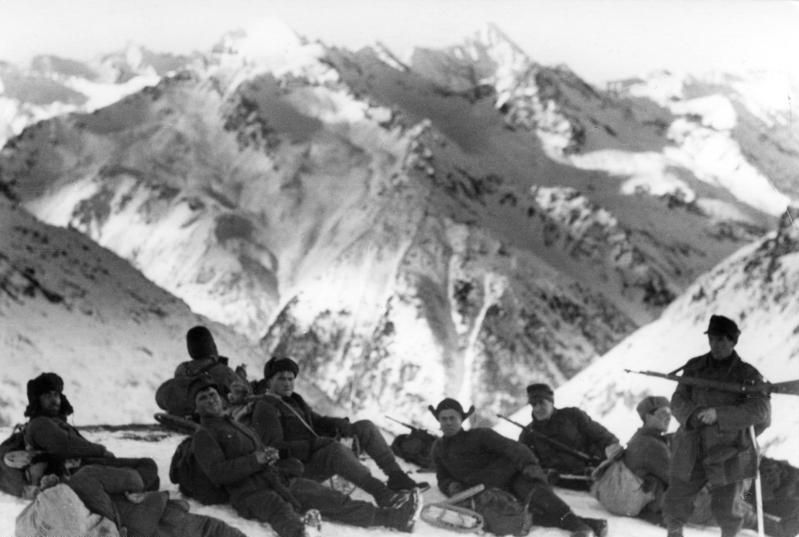
Soldiers of the 1st Mountain Division scaling the Caucasus mountains, December 1942

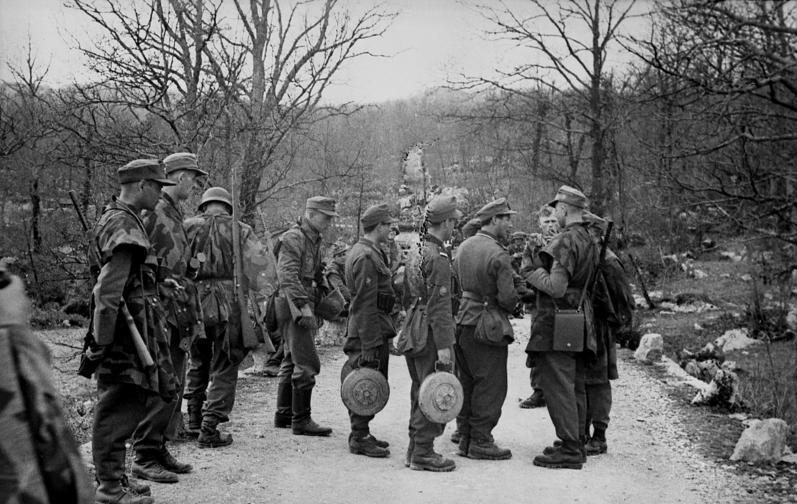
Soldiers of the 1st Mountain Division during an anti-partisan operation in Yugoslavia, 1943–44

The 1st Mountain Division participated in Operation Barbarossa, the invasion of the Soviet Union that began on 22 June 1941. On 30 June, the division captured Lviv. There, the Germans discovered several thousand bodies of prisoners the Soviet NKVD had executed because they could not be evacuated.

The 1st Mountain Division continued its advance into the Soviet Union, participating in the breakthrough of the Stalin Line and the advance to the Dniepr and Mius rivers. The division fought in the Second Battle of Kharkov in May 1942 and then participated in the offensive through southern Russia and into the Caucasus (Operation Edelweiss).

In a symbolic propaganda move, the division sent a detachment to raise the German flag on Mount Elbrus on 21 August 1942. Although the feat was widely publicized by Josef Goebbels, Hitler was furious over what he called "these crazy mountain climbers," his rage lasting for hours. However, by December 1942 with Soviet forces encircling the German 6th Army at Stalingrad, the 1st Mountain Division, as part of the 17th Army, was ordered to withdraw to the Kuban bridgehead.

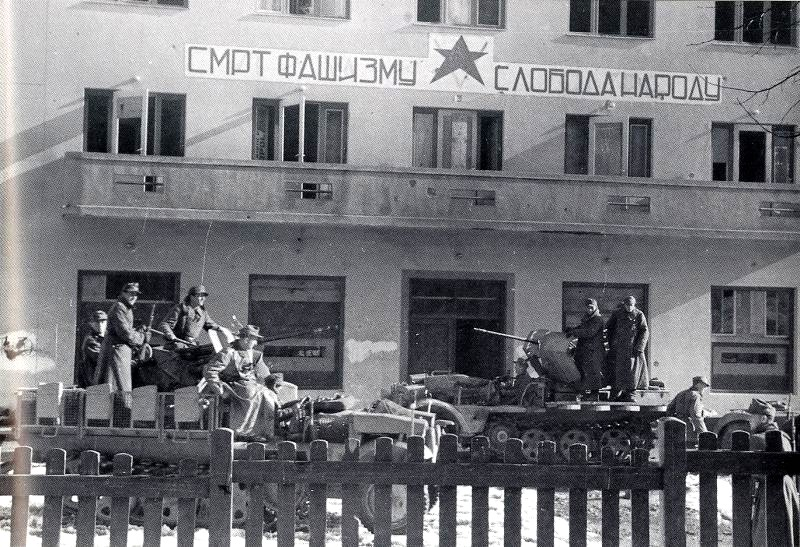
Mounted on half-tracks (armed with flak guns), men of the 1st Mountain Division are parked outside a former partisan HQ at the Hotel Čajniče (written by the partisans on the building is the slogan "Death to fascism - freedom to the people") in the Bosnian town of Tuzla, 11 November 1943

In April 1943, the division was posted to Yugoslavia, where it participated in the anti-partisan offensive named Operation Schwarz, and later Greece where it took part in anti-partisan operations. In November 1943, the division returned to Yugoslavia, where it took part in operations Kugelblitz, Schneesturm, and Waldrausch. In March 1944, the division was engaged in Operation Margarethe, the German invasion of Hungary. After Operation Rübezahl in Yugoslavia in August 1944, the division took part in defensive fighting against the Red Army in the Belgrade Offensive and suffered severe losses. During the operation, the division commander, Generalleutnant Walter Stettner Ritter von Grabenhofen, was killed in action on 17 October 1944 on Avala, a mountain near Belgrade. In late November 1944 it was transferred to Baranja, the most endangered sector of the German defense.

The division was renamed the 1. Volks-Gebirgs-Division ("1st People's Mountain Division") in March 1945. Its final major operations were during Operation Spring Awakening near Lake Balaton in Hungary against the Soviet 3rd Ukrainian Front. Two months later the division surrendered to the Americans in Austria in May 1945.

== War crimes ==
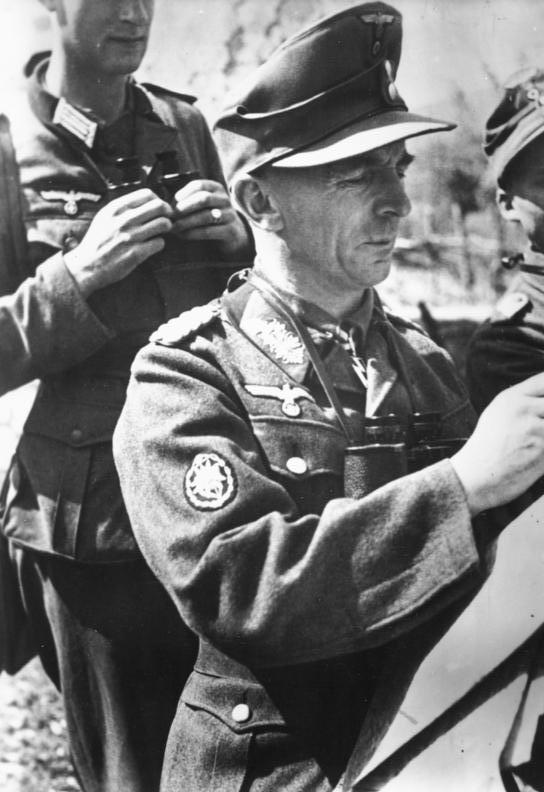
Division's commander, General Walter von Grabenhofen, in Yugoslavia, June 1943

During the invasion of Poland in September 1939, soldiers from the division assisted in the round-up of Jewish civilians from Przemyśl for forced labour, and photos of this were printed in newspapers.

During the Operation Schwarz in Yugoslavia in May–June 1943, the division and other units committed crimes against prisoners of war and civilians. In its after-action report on 10 July, the division reported that it took 498 prisoners, 411 of whom were shot.

On 6 July 1943 a unit from the division attacked the village of Borovë in Albania. All of the houses and buildings were completely burned or otherwise destroyed. Among the 107 inhabitants killed were five entire families. The youngest victim was aged four months, and the oldest 73.

On 25 July 1943, soldiers from the division attacked the village of Mousiotitsa in Greece, killing 153 civilians. On 16 August 1943, the village of Kommeno was attacked on the orders of Oberstleutnant Josef Salminger, the commander of GebirgsJäger Regiment 98. A total of 317 civilians were murdered.

The 1st Mountain Division murdered 5,200 Italian soldiers from the 33rd Infantry Division "Acqui" in September 1943 on the Greek island of Cefalonia after they had surrendered. The division also executed all officers and non-commissioned officers of the 151st Infantry Division "Perugia", who had surrendered in Albania in early October 1943.

After the killing in an ambush of Oberstleutnant Josef Salminger by Greek partisans, the commander of XXII Gebirgs-Armeekorps, General der Gebirgstruppe Hubert Lanz, ordered, on 1 October 1943, a "ruthless retaliatory action" in a 20-kilometre (12 mi) area around the place where Salminger had been attacked. In the village of Lyngiades, 92 of its 96 residents were executed.

The division's war crimes are described in H. F. Meyer's book Bloodstained Edelweiss: The 1st Mountain Division in the Second World War.

== Commanders ==
- General der Gebirgstruppe Ludwig Kübler (1 September 1939 – 25 October 1940)
- General der Gebirgstruppe Hubert Lanz (25 October 1940 – 17 December 1942)
- Generalleutnant Walter Stettner Ritter von Grabenhofen (17 December 1942 – 18 October 1944)
- Generalmajor August Wittmann (19. October 1944 – December 1944)
- Generalleutnant Josef Kübler (27 December 1944 – 10 March 1945)
- Generalleutnant August Wittmann (17 March 1945 – 8 May 1945)

== Order of battle ==
=== 1939 ===
- 98. Mountain Infantry Regiment
  - 3 Battalions
- 99. Mountain Infantry Regiment
  - 3 Battalions
- 100. Mountain Infantry Regiment
  - 3 Battalions
- 4. Panzerabwehr (anti-tank) Battalion
- 79. Mountain Artillery Regiment
  - 4 Battalions
- 54. Signals Battalion
- 54. Pioneer Battalion
- 54. Supply Troops
- Service Troops

=== 1941 ===
- 98. Mountain Infantry Regiment
  - 3 Battalions
- 99. Mountain Infantry Regiment
  - 3 Battalions
- 54. Field Medical Battalion
- 44. Panzerabwehr Battalion
- 79. Mountain Artillery Regiment
  - 4 Battalions
- 54. Signals Battalion
- 54. Pioneer Battalion
- 54. Supply Troops
- Service Troops

=== 1943 ===
- 98. Mountain Infantry Regiment
  - 3 Battalions
- 99. Mountain Infantry Regiment
  - 3 Battalions
- 44. Panzerjäger Battalion
- 79. Mountain Artillery Regiment
  - 4 Battalions
- 54. Mountain Jäger Battalion
- 54. Reconnaissance Battalion
- 54. Mountain Signals Battalion
- 79. Mountain Field Medical Battalion
- 54. Mountain Pioneer Battalion
- 54. Mountain Pack Mule Battalion
- 54. Supply Troops
- Service Troops

== Notable members ==
- Ferdinand Schörner, war criminal and the last living German field marshal, holder of the Knight's Cross with Oak Leaves, Swords and Diamonds
- Wego Chiang, son of the Chinese leader General Chiang Kai-shek, who served in I./Gebirgsjäger-Regiment 98 from 1937 to 1939, reaching the rank of leutnant before returning to China at the outbreak of World War II.
