= XXII Mountain Corps =

Mountain corps of the German Army during World War II

- XXII. Gebirgs-Armeekorps
- Active: 12 August 1943 – 8 May 1945
- Disbanded: 8 May 1945
- Country: Germany

Commanders
- Notable commanders: Hubert Lanz

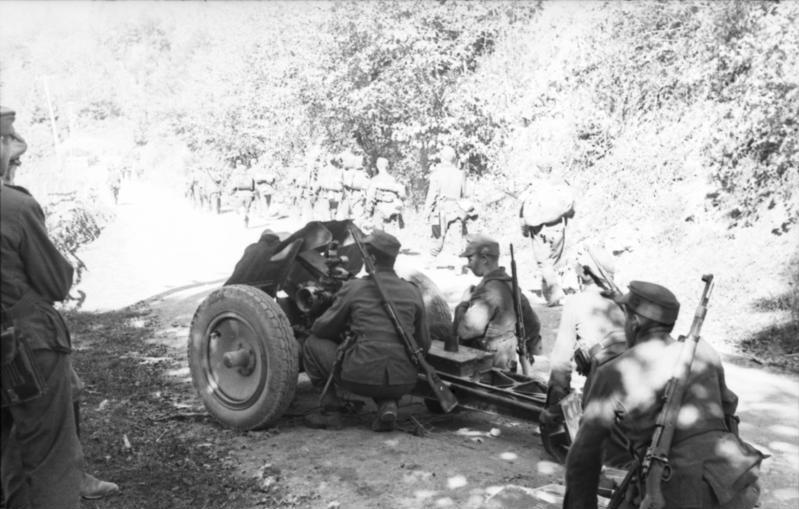

XXII Mountain Corps was a mountain corps of the German Army during World War II that fought in Greece, Yugoslavia and Hungary between 1943 and 1945.

Until September 1944, it was subordinate to Army Group E and after that to the 2nd Panzer Army.

== Commanders ==
- General der Gebirgstruppe Hubert Lanz (12 August 1943 – 8 May 1945)

== Source ==
- Lexikon der Wehrmacht
