= Lingiades massacre =

1943 mass killing of Greek civilians by occupying Nazi forces during WWII

- Location: 39.69048978211814°N 20.88892272962713°E; Lingiades, Ioannina, Greece
- Date: 3 October 1943
- Target: Population of the village
- Attack type: Mass murder, burning of village
- Deaths: 92
- Injuries: 5 (and sole survivors of the massacre)
- Perpetrator: German 1st Mountain Division
- Motive: Village was arbitrarily chosen in reprisal for the killing of a German officer by the Greek resistance

The Lingiades massacre, on 3 October 1943, was a Nazi German war crime committed by members of the 1st Mountain Division of the Wehrmacht Heer during the Axis occupation of Greece. The village of Lingiades (Greek: Λιγκιάδες), near Ioannina in northwestern Greece, was arbitrarily chosen as a target for reprisals by the Wehrmacht due to the killing of a German officer by members of the Greek Resistance. The vast majority of the victims were children, women, and elderly.

== Background ==
Greek resistance groups were active in northwestern Greece (Epirus) during World War II. On 1 October 1943, a unit of the National Republican Greek League (EDES) ambushed a German convoy near Preveza. In the firefight, the commander of Mountaineering Regiment 98, Lieutenant-Colonel Josef Salminger, was killed by Greek partisans. Salminger, an ardent Nazi, was notorious for conducting attacks against civilians, such as the massacre of Kommeno which resulted in the murder of 317 villagers.

Salminger's death prompted General Hubert Lanz, commander of the 1st Mountain Division, to order reprisals within a 20 km radius of the ambush. Lingiades, a tiny mountain village 13 kilometres northwest of Ioannina, overlooks Ioannina Lake and Ioannina from an elevation about 940 m above. The village could not be linked to resistance activity by German intelligence. It may have been chosen as a target due to its visibility from Ioannina. Its nearby destruction would likely spread terror among the local populace.

== The attack ==
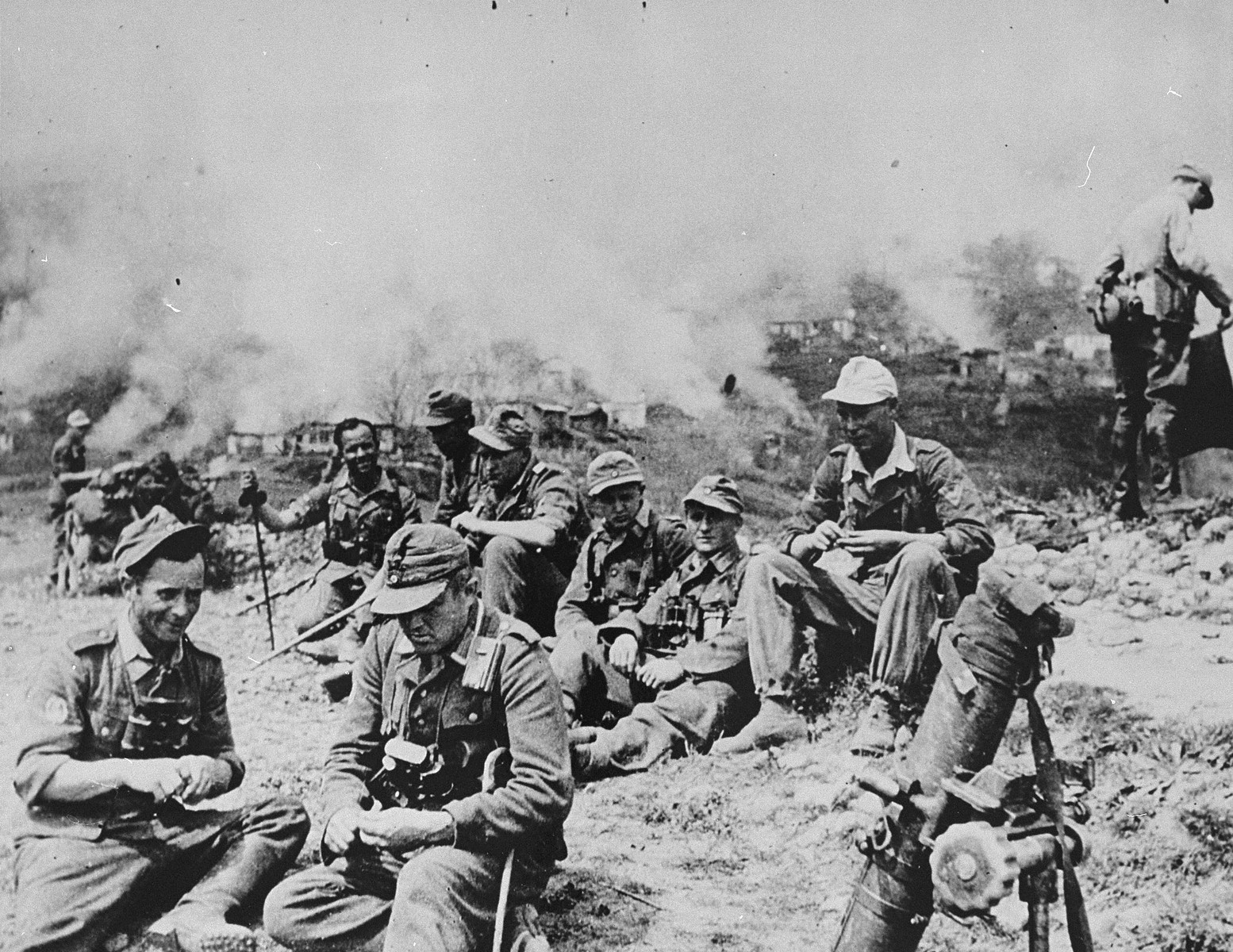
German mountain troops after destroying a village in Epirus

On Sunday, 3 October, elements of the German 79th Field Battalion commanded by Major Hans Mayr arrived in Lingiades. Of the town's 287 inhabitants, most village adults were in an neighbouring town for the walnut harvest. Villagers who could not run away were dragged by German soldiers to the central square of the village. After dwellings were searched and looted, all civilians were divided into small groups and driven into the cellars of various dwellings. There they were shot down by machine guns. Apart from the church and the village school, all buildings in the village were set on fire. The majority of the 92 victims were children, infants, women, and the aged. Thirty-two of the dead were aged between six months and 11 years. Five civilians managed to survive, two adults and three children. They feigned death among the corpses and then escaped from the burning buildings by ascending via the fireplace chimney.

== Investigation ==
No one was ever held accountable for the atrocity in Lingiades.

== Memory ==
On 7 March 2014, German President Joachim Gauck visited Lingiades together with his Greek counterpart, Karolos Papoulias. Gauck was the first German official to visit the site. He expressed his apologies for the atrocities committed by the Wehrmacht, saying, "With shame and pain I ask in the name of Germany the families of the victims for forgiveness ... I bow in front of the victims for this monstrous crime." Still, Gauck dismissed the claims for reparation payments to the victims.

== See also ==
- Massacres of Mousiotitsa
- Massacre of Kommeno

== Sources ==
- Hermann, Hans-Georg (2008). Von den Leges Barbarorum bis zum ius barbarum des Nationalsozialismus: Festschrift für Hermann Nehlsen zum 70. Geburtstag (in German). Böhlau Verlag Köln Weimar. pp. 423–425. ISBN 9783412201418.
- Kambas, Chryssoula; Mitsou, Marilisa (2015). Die Okkupation Griechenlands im Zweiten Weltkrieg: Griechische und deutsche Erinnerungskultur (in German). Böhlau Verlag Köln Weimar. ISBN 9783412224677.
- Meyer, Hermann Frank (2008). Blutiges Edelweiß: die 1. Gebirgs-Division im Zweiten Weltkrieg (in German). Ch. Links Verlag. ISBN 9783861534471.
