= Massacre of Kommeno =

Nazi war crime committed in Greece

- Location: 39°03′00″N 21°02′00″E; Kommeno, Greece (under German occupation)
- Date: 16 August 1943
- Target: Population of the village
- Attack type: Mass murder, looting, arson
- Weapons: machine guns, hand-grenades and rifles
- Deaths: 317
- Perpetrator: Walter Stettner: 98th Regiment of the 1st Mountain Division
- Motive: Reprisal for the requisitioning of food by the Greek Resistance in the village

The Massacre of Kommeno (Greek: Η σφαγή του Κομμένου; German: Massaker von Kommeno) was a Nazi war crime perpetrated by members of the Wehrmacht in the village of Kommeno, Greece, in 1943, during the German occupation of Greece in World War II.

== Background ==
=== Geography ===
Kommeno is a village in western Greece near Arta. It is located on the east bank of the Arachthos river, north of the Gulf of Ambracia. According to the 1940 census, it had 776 inhabitants engaged in agriculture and fishing.

=== 1943 in Kommeno ===
By the summer of 1943, Greek partisan organizations such as ELAS and EDES had assembled strong armed bands which frequently attacked the Axis occupation forces. As the partisans relied upon civilians for food and intelligence, the Wehrmacht applied collective responsibility to entire communities and systematically used mass reprisals to intimidate the population. The massacre of Kommeno is a typical example of this policy.

On 12 August 1943 a small food requisitioning detachment of partisans reached Kommeno. While collecting food, a two-man Wehrmacht reconnaissance team drove into the village and upon seeing the partisans, made a U-turn and drove away. Fearing reprisals, the locals spent the night in the fields and sent a delegation to the Italian commander in Arta to explain the situation. Being reassured that there wouldn't be any consequences, they returned to their homes and prepared to celebrate the Dormition of Mary on the 15th. On the evening of 15 August, a marriage had taken place in Kommeno and many people from the village and the surrounding area stayed up late celebrating.

== The massacre ==
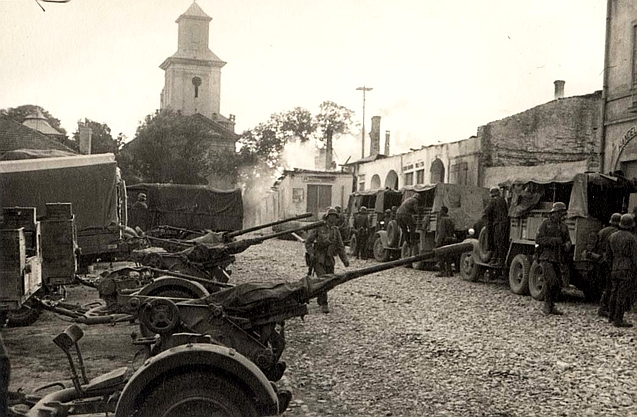
The 98th Regiment of the 1st Mt Division during the invasion of Poland, 1939

At dawn on 16 August, 120 men of the 12th Company of the 98th Regiment of the 1st Mountain Division drove to Kommeno on lorries. The group was commanded by Oberleutnant Willibald Röser, a devoted National Socialist known by the nickname "Nero of 12/98". On the previous night, the regiment commander Oberst Josef Salminger had given them a short, fierce speech alleging that they were going to wipe out a partisan nest and ordering them to spare no one. Most of the men had been fighting in the Eastern Front and they were accustomed to carrying out similar reprisals against the local population. Three weeks earlier, most of these men had taken part in the first assault against Mousiotitsa, murdering 136 civilians.

The soldiers surrounded the village from three directions, leaving unattended only the access to the Arachthos river. Houses were first attacked with grenades and as villagers awoke and tried to flee, they were indiscriminately shot at. Many women, children and elderly fell victims.

Among the first casualties was the village priest, who was killed by Röser as he begged him to spare his church fold. Several eyewitness reports described women being raped, people beaten and corpses humiliated. Around forty of the marriage guests that were still awake celebrating were also murdered.

The only escape route lay across the river and many villagers managed to cross it, either swimming or onboard small boats. After seizing livestock and looting valuables, the Germans set the village ablaze.

== Aftermath ==
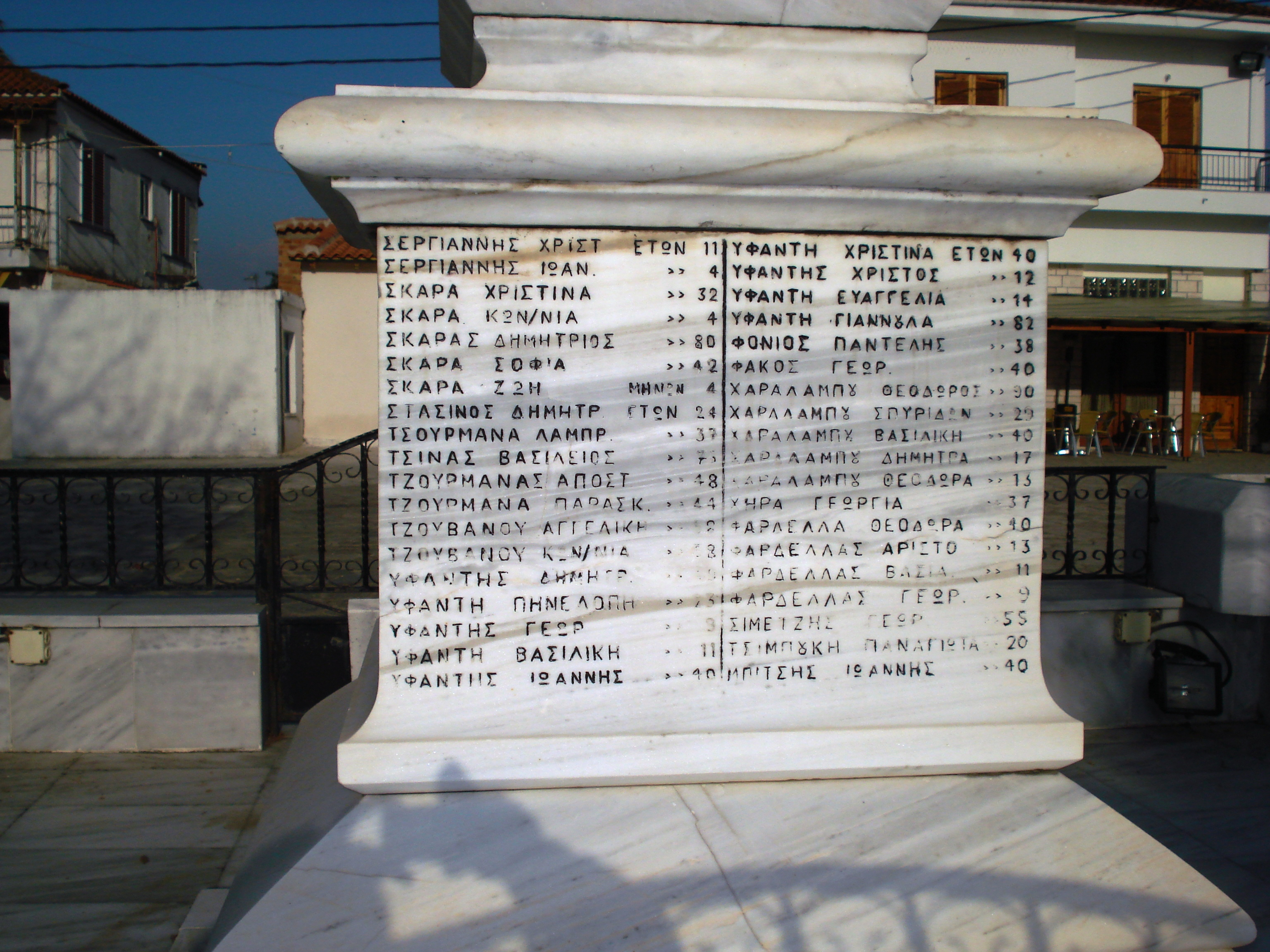
Memorial to the massacre in Kommeno, with the names and ages of those killed

The official list of casualties includes 317 victims, among which 73 children aged under ten, 20 entire families and the newlyweds. A monument commemorating the massacre has been erected in the main square.

The official Wehrmacht reports about the events in Kommeno falsely claimed that the village was in partisan hands who opened heavy fire against the Germans. It also claimed that 150 "partisans" were killed as a result.

Salminger was killed in an ambush by partisans on 1 October 1943. In reprisal, German forces of the 1st Mountain Division perpetrated the Lyngiades massacre on 3 October 1943. Röser was killed in November 1944 in Freiburg during an airstrike. The divisional commander, Generalleutnant Walter Stettner went missing after mid-October 1944 near Belgrade. No reparations were paid to the families of the victims.

== See also ==
- Massacres of Mousiotitsa
- Lyngiades massacre
- Massacre of Kalavryta
- Distomo massacre
- Viannos massacres
- Holocaust of Kedros
- List of massacres in Greece
- War crimes of the Wehrmacht
