= Lingiades =

- Community
- Location within Greece
- Coordinates: 39°41′24″N 20°53′24″E
- Country: Greece
- Administrative region: Epirus
- Regional unit: Ioannina
- Municipality: Ioannina
- Municipal unit: Perama
- Elevation: 1,020 m (3,350 ft)

Population (2021)
  - Community: 117
- Time zone: UTC+2 (EET)
  - Summer (DST): UTC+3 (EEST)

Lingiades (Greek: Λιγκιάδες) is a settlement in Ioannina regional unit, Epirus, Greece. The village is located on the southern part of the south western side of Mount Mitsikeli, above Lake Ioannina.

== Name ==
Earlier interpretations of the toponym associated it with the ancient oronym of Lygos or the ancient Epirote city of Lygos, although the linguist Kostas Oikonomou described it as untenable. Oikonomou stated the toponym is derived from the Albanian word lëngat/ë, -a, meaning 'serious long-term illness, contagious disease, epidemic'. Within the toponym, the sounds g and l underwent palatalisation, while the Albanian ë became i through Greek. The Greek suffix -ades is used in the formation of several placenames to indicate a place where a familial unit referred to in the subject is settled.

The village was established following a plague event at a previous location and resettlement of its inhabitants to the new site. Oikonomou stated the suffix's etymological role in the toponym's formation verifies historical memories preserved in oral tradition about the village.

== History ==
The village of Lingiades was established prior to 1683, near the Monastery of Agios Georgios. Dispersed people initially settled in the village; later, others came from Tsamouria (Chameria).

Local traditions stated the village was originally located at the site of Alogomantri, where it comprised 59 houses and had five churches: Agios Georgios, Agios Dimitrios, Agios Nikolaos, Prophet Elias, and Agios Minas. Following a devastating plague that killed many inhabitants, the survivors from the six remaining houses fled the site. To avoid further contagion, they established individual homes in several locations, including Katsoufli, Kravari, Marmaralona, Amygdalia, Lakko Krania, Rachi Lai, and Perperi, separated by some distance to avoid contact with each other.

The plague eventually reached these sites as well, devastating the inhabitants and their livestock. Survivors from this 'old village' (Paliochora) later left and settled at the site of the present village. In the same year, Vissarion, a native of Ioannina, arrived and chose a location to build the church of Agios Georgios. He encouraged the villagers to rebuild their homes nearby; with their assistance, the church was completed, and the population and livestock numbers gradually recovered.

== Demographics ==
The village is inhabited by Greeks.

== See also ==
- Lingiades massacre
- List of settlements in the Ioannina regional unit
