= Dodoni =

Village in Epirus, Greece

Dodoni Δωδώνη
- Municipality
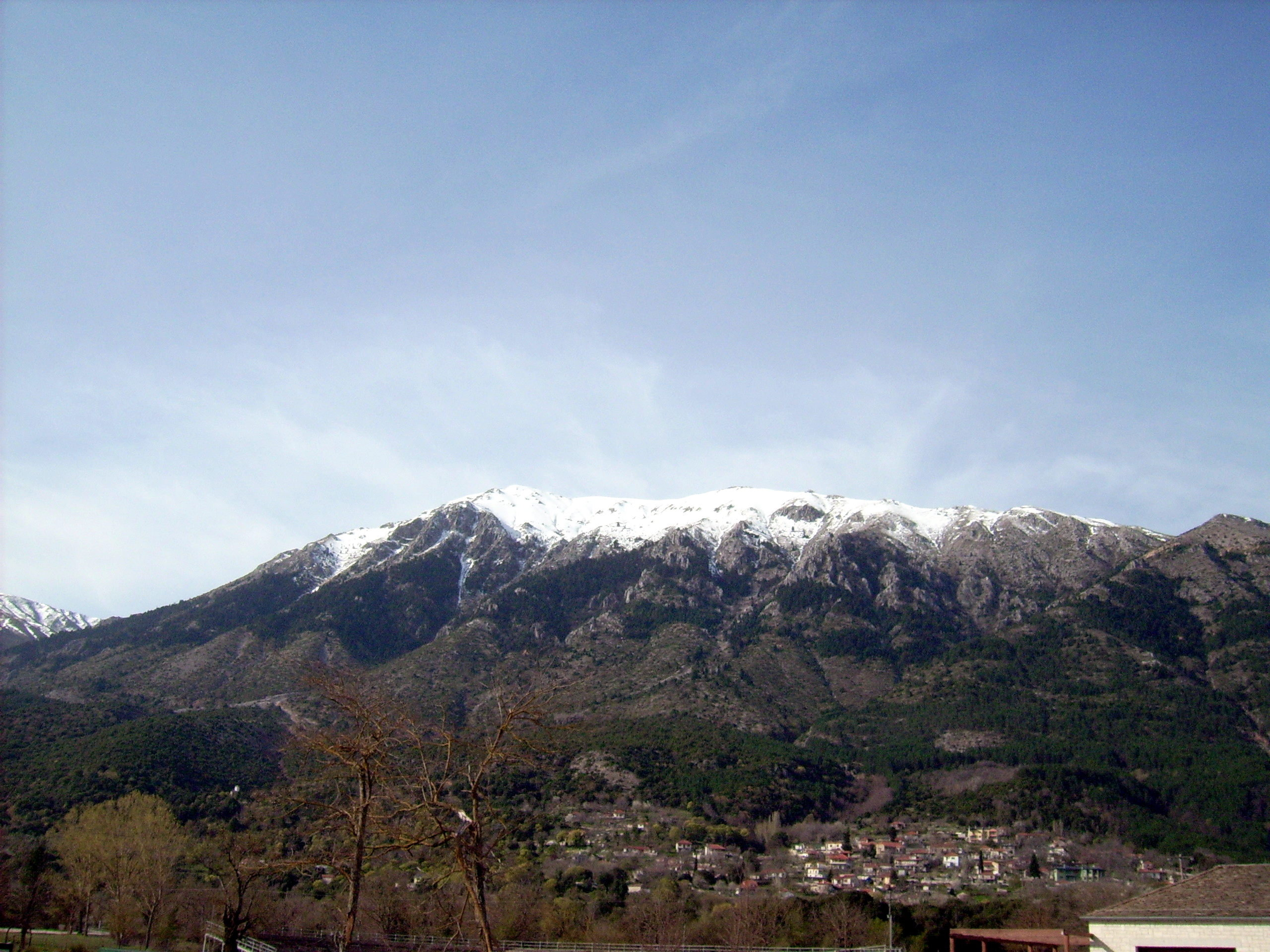
- View of Dodoni and mount Tomaros

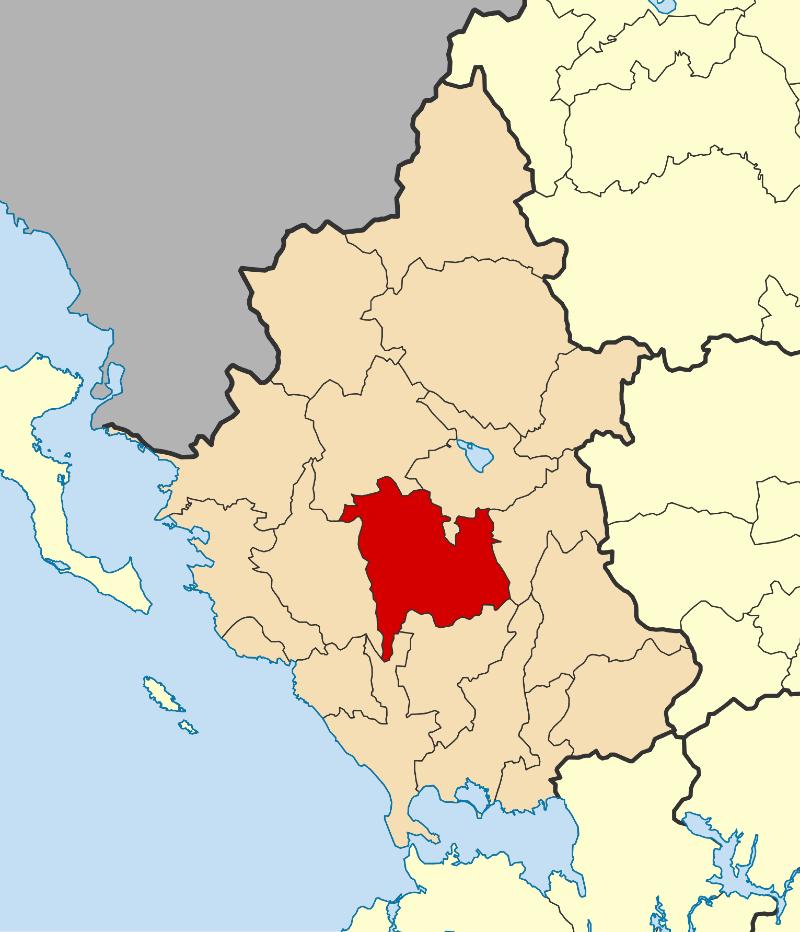

- Location within Greece
- Coordinates: 39°33′N 20°46′E
- Country: Greece
- Administrative region: Epirus
- Regional unit: Ioannina

Area
  - Municipality: 657.5 km^{2} (253.9 sq mi)
  - Municipal unit: 101.0 km^{2} (39.0 sq mi)
  - Community: 8.748 km^{2} (3.378 sq mi)

Population (2021)
  - Municipality: 7,199
  - Density: 10.95/km^{2} (28.36/sq mi)
  - Municipal unit: 937
  - Municipal unit density: 9.28/km^{2} (24.0/sq mi)
  - Community: 185
  - Community density: 21.1/km^{2} (54.8/sq mi)
- Time zone: UTC+2 (EET)
  - Summer (DST): UTC+3 (EEST)
- Vehicle registration: ΙΝ

Dodoni (Greek: Δωδώνη) is a village and a municipality in the Ioannina regional unit, Epirus, Greece. The seat of the municipality is the village Agia Kyriaki (community Theriakisi).

The modern village of Dodoni is located near the ancient city of same name and site of the ancient oracle of Dodona. Oedipus the King was shot here in 1967.

== Municipality ==
The present municipality Dodoni was formed at the 2011 local government reform by the merger of the following 4 former municipalities, that became municipal units:

- Agios Dimitrios
- Dodoni
- Lakka Souliou
- Selloi

The municipality Dodoni has an area of 657.499 km^{2}, the municipal unit Dodoni has an area of 101.016 km^{2}, and the community Dodoni has an area of 8.748 km^{2}.

== Gallery ==
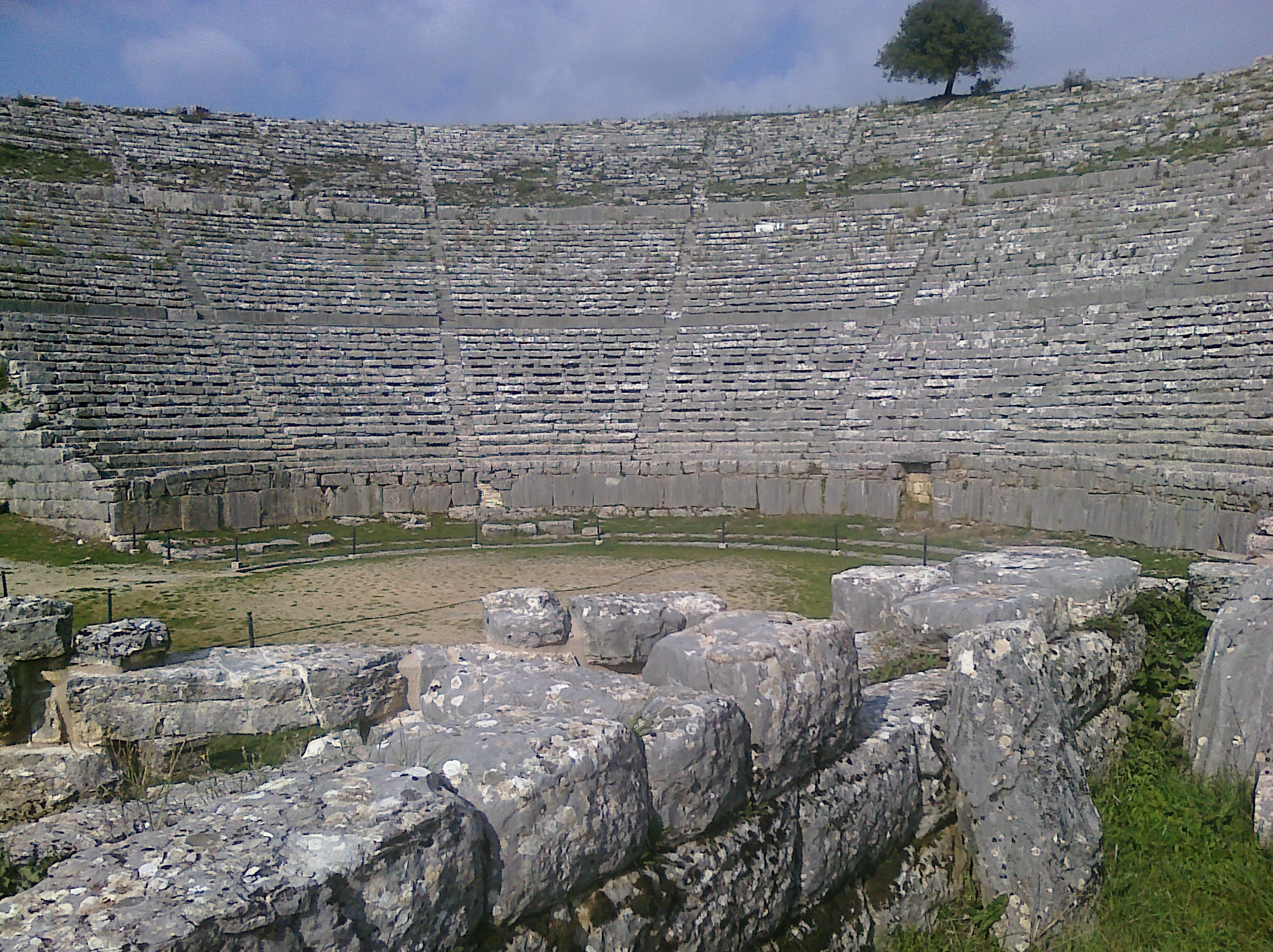
Theatre at Dodoni

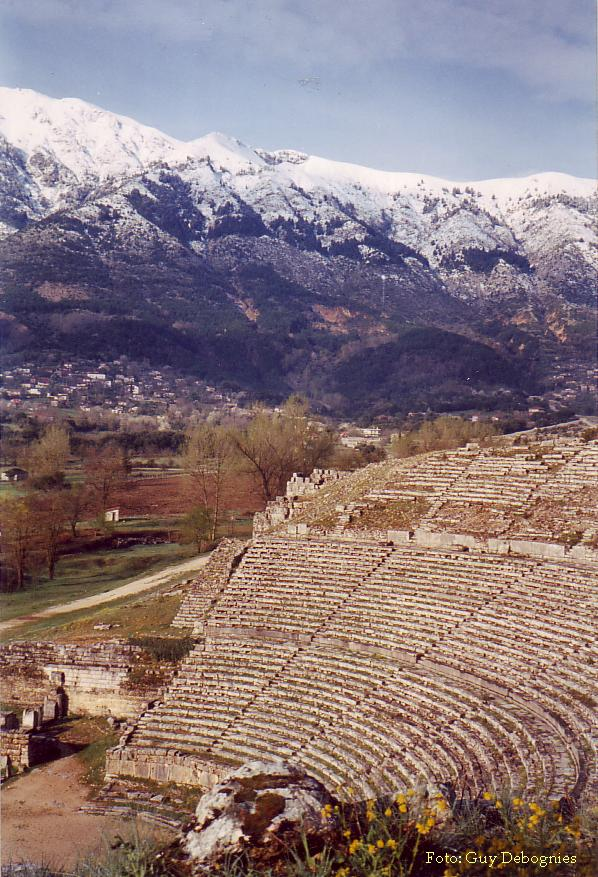
View on theatre and Mount Tomaros
