= Sergei Simonov =

Sergei Simonov is the name of:

- Sergei Simonov (firearms designer) (1894–1986), Soviet weapons designer
- Sergei Simonov (ice hockey) (1992–2016), Russian professional ice hockey player
- Sergei Simonov (footballer) (born 1983), Russian footballer
