= Justice Howard (disambiguation) =

Justice Howard (fl. 1990s–2020s) is an American photographer. Justice Howard may also refer to:

- Joseph Howard (judge) (1800–1877), associate justice of the Maine Supreme Judicial Court
- Timothy Edward Howard (1837–1916), associate justice and chief justice of the Supreme Court of Indiana

== See also ==
- Judge Howard (disambiguation)
