= Archaeological Museum of Agrinio =

Museum in Agrinio, Greece

Coordinates: 38°37′59″N 21°24′39.4″E

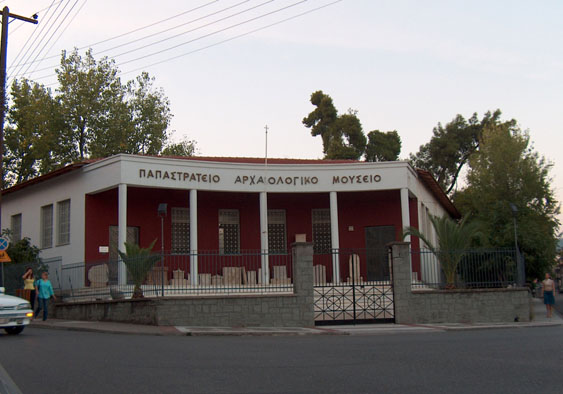

The Archaeological Museum of Agrinio (Greek: Αρχαιολογικό Μουσείο Αγρινίου, Archaiologiko Mouseio Agriniou) is a museum in the city of Agrinio in Aetolia-Acarnania, in Greece. It lies next to the Papastrateio Municipal Park and features artifacts dating back to Antiquity and Roman times from the area around Agrinio. It was constructed in 1960 through the donation of the Papastratos firm.
