= Agrinio =

City in Greece

Agrinio Αγρίνιο
- Municipality
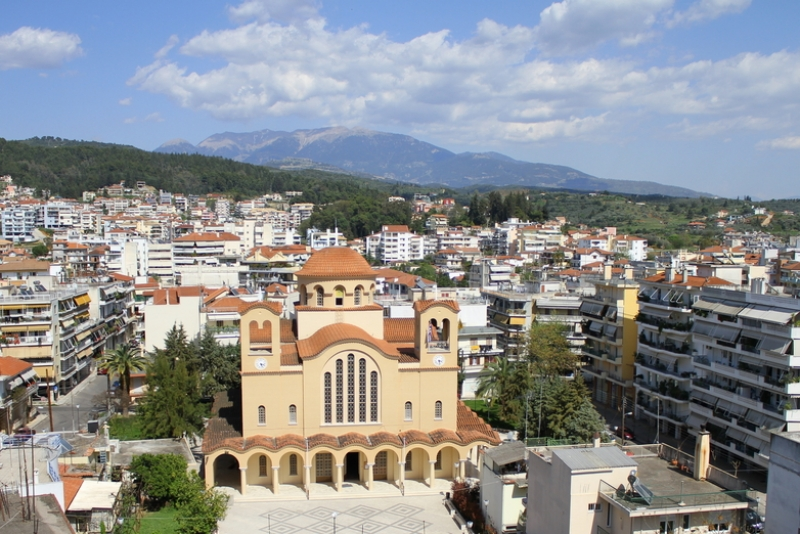
- Aerial view of the city with the Saint Christopher church in the center

- Seal

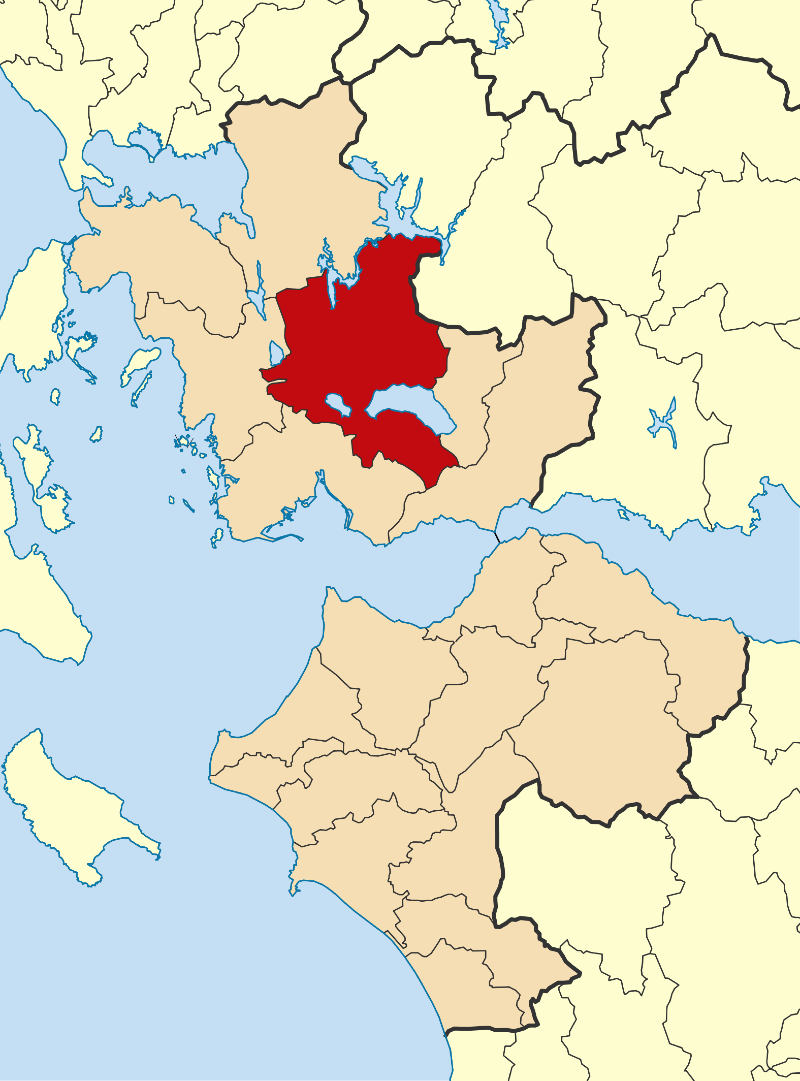

- Location within Greece
- Coordinates: 38°37′N 21°24′E
- Country: Greece
- Administrative region: Western Greece
- Regional unit: Aetolia-Acarnania

Government
  - Mayor: Georgios Papanastasiou (New Democracy; since 2014)

Area
  - Municipality: 1,229.33 km^{2} (474.65 sq mi)
  - Municipal unit: 162.73 km^{2} (62.83 sq mi)
- Elevation: 91 m (299 ft)

Population (2021)
  - Municipality: 89,691
  - Density: 72.959/km^{2} (188.96/sq mi)
  - Municipal unit: 60,609
  - Municipal unit density: 372.45/km^{2} (964.64/sq mi)
  - Community: 50,690
- Time zone: UTC+2 (EET)
  - Summer (DST): UTC+3 (EEST)
- Postal code: 301 00
- Area code: 26410
- Vehicle registration: ΑΙ
- Website: https://agrinio.gov.gr/

Agrinio (Greek: Αγρίνιο, pronounced [aˈɣrinio]) is the largest city and municipality of the Aetolia-Acarnania regional unit of Greece, as well as the second largest city in Western Greece after Patras. It is the economic center of Aetolia-Acarnania, although its capital is the town of Mesolonghi. The settlement dates back to ancient times. Ancient Agrinion was 3 kilometres (2 miles) northeast of the present city; some walls and foundations of which have been excavated. In medieval times and until 1836, the city was known as Vrachori (Βραχώρι). According to the 2021 census, the municipality of Agrinio has a population of 89,691, of whom 50,690 live within the city limits of Agrinio.

The majority of the local population was occupied for an important period of time in the tobacco industry, from the last decades of 19th till the end of the 20th century. Big tobacco companies were founded in the city, including the famous Papastratos, alongside Panagopoulos and Papapetrou. Agrinion is also agriculturally known for its production of Agrinion olives.

== History ==
=== Antiquity ===
According to mythology, the ancient city of Agrinion (or Agrinium), situated in the area of Megali Chora, was built by king Agrios, son of Portheus and a great-grandson of Aetolos (king of Plevron and Calydon) around 1600–1100 BC.

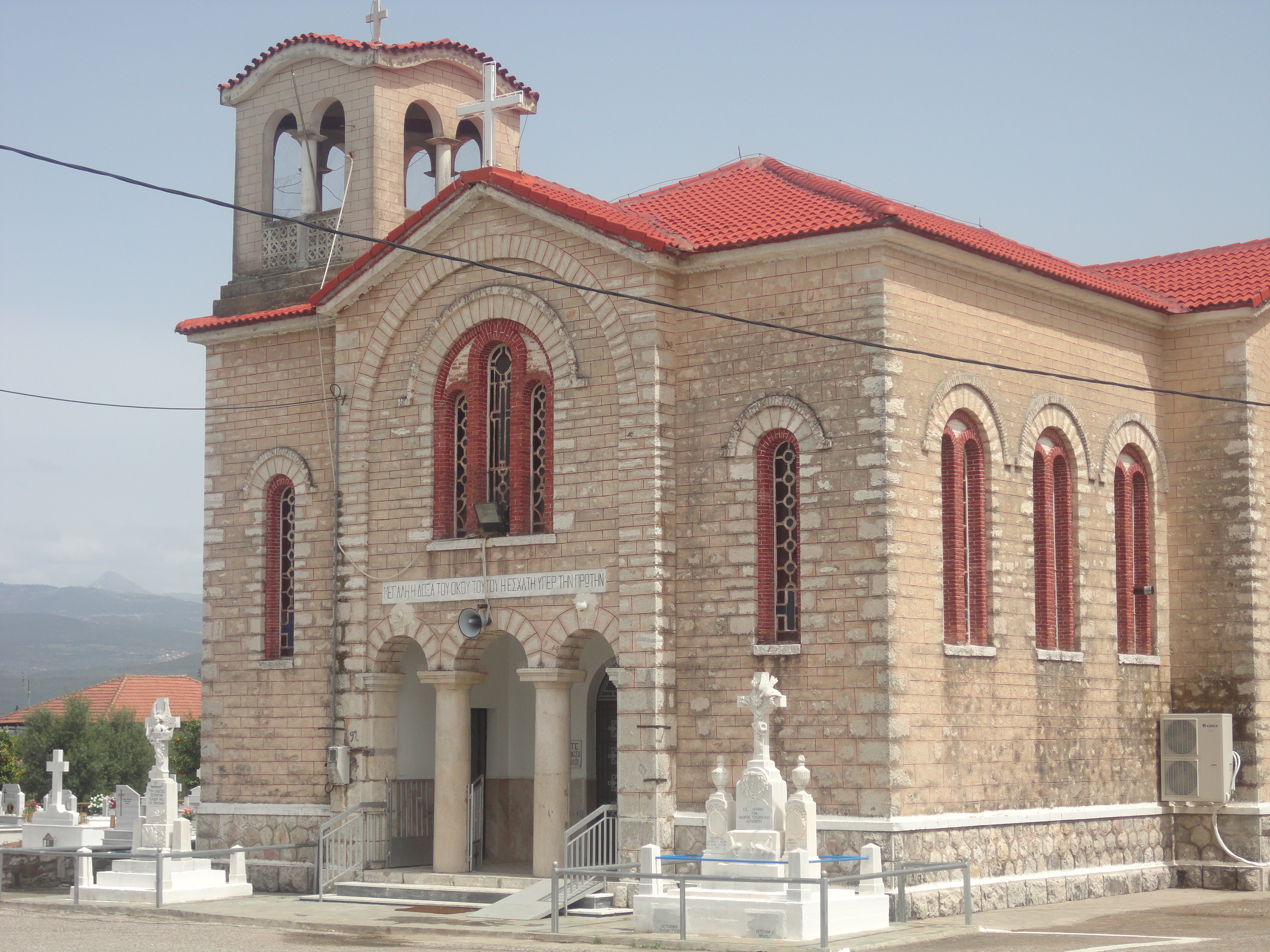
Saint John church in Dafnias, Agrinio, Greece

The town, built near the banks of river Achelous (the natural border between Aetolia and Acarnania), was claimed by both states during ancient times. Agrinio became member of the Aetolian League and it was later destroyed by Cassander in 314 BC during the League's wars against the Kingdom of Macedonia.

=== Ottoman era ===
The city reappeared during the Ottoman period with the name Vrachori and apart from its Greek population it was also inhabited by many Turks (Muslims). In 1585 it was deserted during the revolt of Theodoros Migas. At the beginning of the 18th century, it became the administrative centre of Aetolia-Acarnania (then as the sanjak of Karleli), depended on the imperial harems. Vrachori participated in the Greek Revolution and was temporarily liberated, by an army group led by Alexakis Vlachopoulos, on 11 June 1821. In August 1822, while Reşid Mehmed Pasha's (Kütahi) troops were marching towards Vrachori, its citizens decided to burn and evacuate their city, following the strategy of scorched earth. The deserted city was recaptured by the Turks. The city was finally included in the borders of the newborn Greek state permanently in 1832 with the Treaty of Constantinople (9 July 1832) and was renamed after its ancient name, Agrinion.

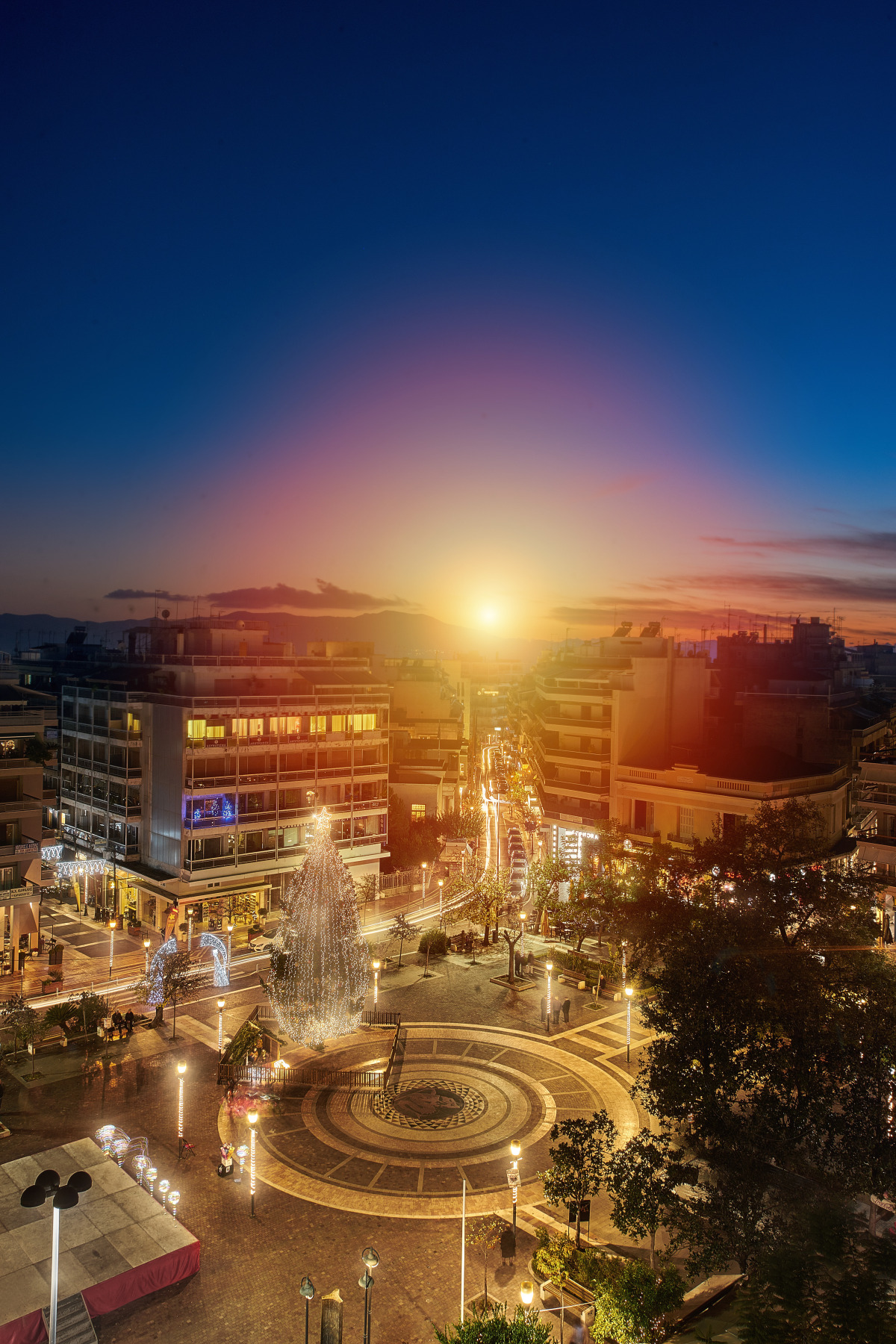
Christmas Central Square

=== Modern era ===
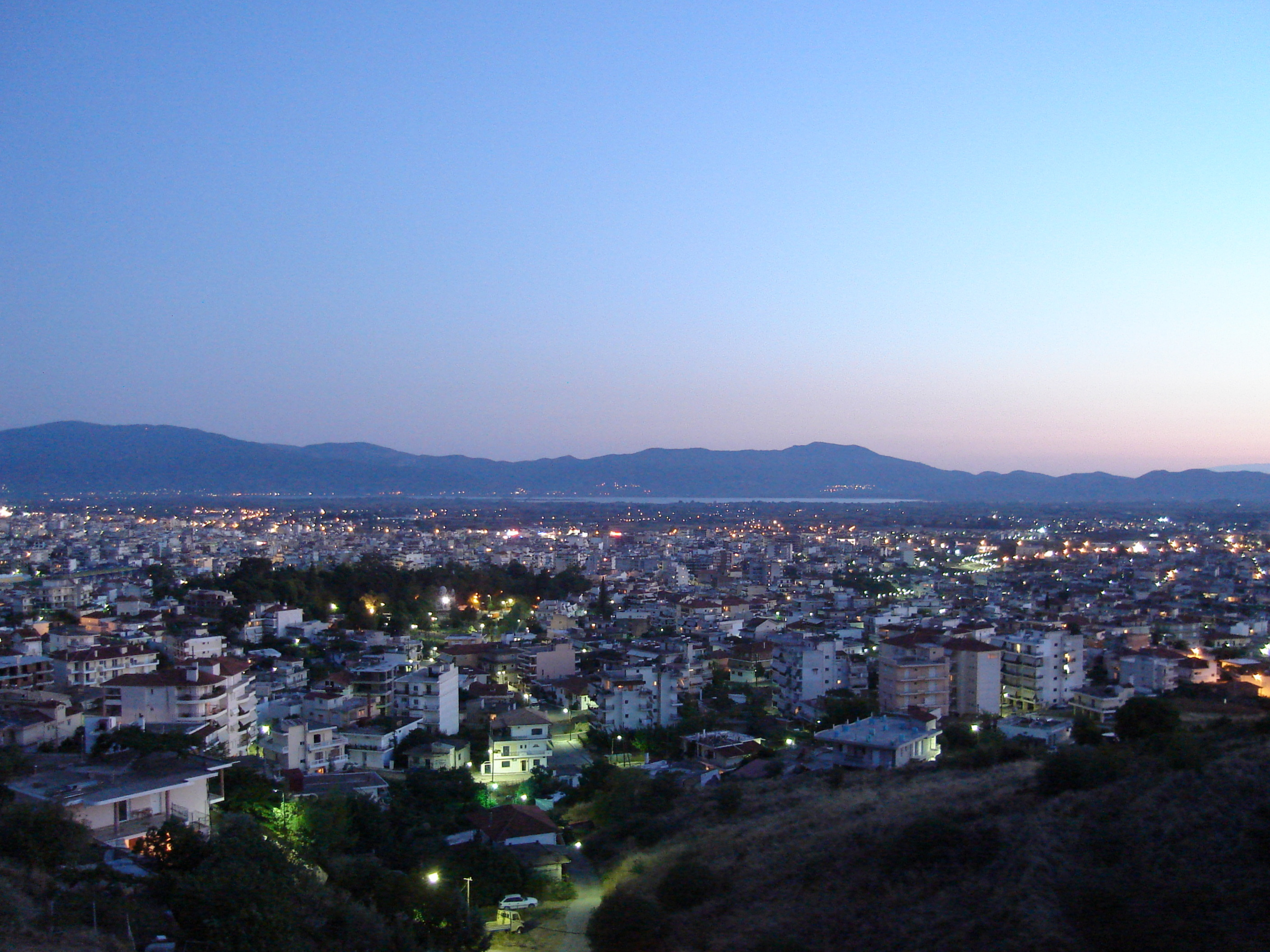
View of the city

In the years following the liberation, Agrinio went through an important growth and development, especially at the end of the 19th century and the dawn of the 20th. After the Greco-Turkish War and the Asia Minor Catastrophe, many refugees from Asia Minor (western Turkey) arrived in the city and settled in the district of Agios Konstantinos. At the same period there was an important internal immigration to Agrinio from the whole Aetolia-Acarnania region, along with immigration from the areas of Epirus and Evrytania.

During the Interwar period, in spite of economical crisis, works of infrastructure took place in the city, like the paving of streets and the installation of electricity, and a water tower was installed in 1930. At the same time excavations revealed the ancient city of Agrinion. Growth and prosperity returned after World War II and the Greek Civil War. This growth was boosted by the building of two major hydroelectric dam installations at Kremasta and Kastraki, on the north of the city. The tobacco industry and olive tree cultivation became the main income sources of the city.

== Geography ==
=== Geology ===
The area, like nearly all of Greece is prone to earthquakes. On 10 April 2007, the city was struck by several earthquakes, with their epicenter located in the nearby Lake Trichonis on the southeast of the city. The first earthquake rumbled at around 2:20 AM, the second around 6:15 AM, three earthquakes shook at 10:13, 10:14 and 10:15 AM, and the last one at around 13:45 PM, they measured between 5.0 and 5.7 on the Richter scale. Residents reported that the buildings and its glasses were shaking and rumbling. Minor damages were reported without any victims.

=== Climate ===
The climate of Agrinio is Mediterranean (Csa) according to the Köppen climate classification, with a large amount of rainfall during the winter, just as the rest of Western Greece, and high daytime temperatures during the relatively dry summer, sometimes over 40 °C (104 °F).

Climate data for Agrinio, 24 m asl (1956–2010)
Month	Jan	Feb	Mar	Apr	May	Jun	Jul	Aug	Sep	Oct	Nov	Dec	Year
Mean daily maximum °C (°F)	13.6 (56.5)	14.4 (57.9)	17.0 (62.6)	20.8 (69.4)	26.2 (79.2)	30.8 (87.4)	33.5 (92.3)	33.8 (92.8)	29.6 (85.3)	24.4 (75.9)	19.0 (66.2)	14.8 (58.6)	23.2 (73.8)
Daily mean °C (°F)	8.3 (46.9)	9.1 (48.4)	11.6 (52.9)	15.3 (59.5)	20.5 (68.9)	25.0 (77.0)	27.4 (81.3)	27.1 (80.8)	22.9 (73.2)	18.0 (64.4)	13.2 (55.8)	9.6 (49.3)	17.3 (63.1)
Mean daily minimum °C (°F)	3.4 (38.1)	3.9 (39.0)	5.6 (42.1)	8.3 (46.9)	12.4 (54.3)	15.8 (60.4)	17.7 (63.9)	17.9 (64.2)	15.1 (59.2)	11.6 (52.9)	8.0 (46.4)	5.0 (41.0)	10.4 (50.7)
Average precipitation mm (inches)	114.7 (4.52)	105.5 (4.15)	80.6 (3.17)	62.0 (2.44)	41.0 (1.61)	21.1 (0.83)	15.2 (0.60)	17.0 (0.67)	52.5 (2.07)	100.2 (3.94)	154.4 (6.08)	154.5 (6.08)	918.7 (36.16)
Average precipitation days	12.9	12.4	12.4	11.2	8.6	4.9	2.9	3.1	6.2	9.6	12.9	15.5	112.6
Average relative humidity (%)	76.2	73.8	70.4	68.0	62.7	57.2	55.1	56.3	64.3	70.9	78.6	79.1	67.7
Mean monthly sunshine hours	126.9	132.4	173.5	201.7	261.4	325.1	360.1	330.0	259.9	196.4	140.7	117.2	2,625.3
Source: HNMS, 1956-1997 sunlight

== Transportation ==
The main roads passing through Agrinio are the Greek National Road 5/E55 (Arta – Agrinio – Missolonghi) and the Greek National Road 38/E952 (Thermo – Agrinio – Karpenisi). Since 2009, the A5 motorway bypasses Agrinio to the west.

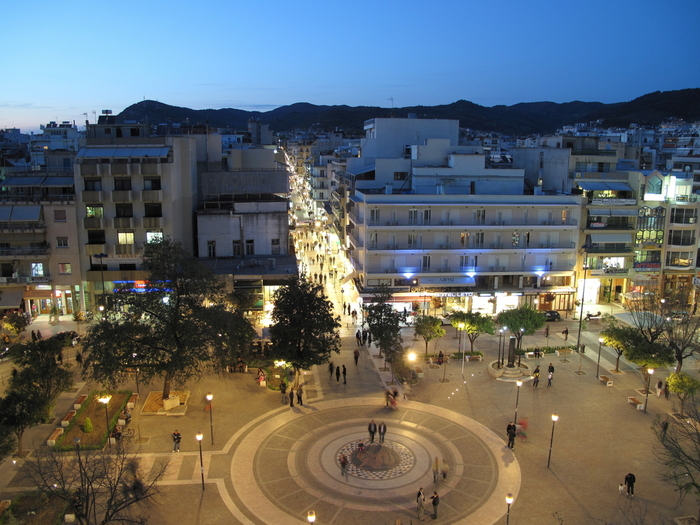
Central square

Agrinio's airport is located near the city, in the area of Dokimi. IATA code: AGQ, ICAO: LGAG. The airport hosts the Agrinion aeroclub Agrinion Aeroclub, website.

== Municipality ==
Agrinio municipality map.

Agrinio municipal unit.

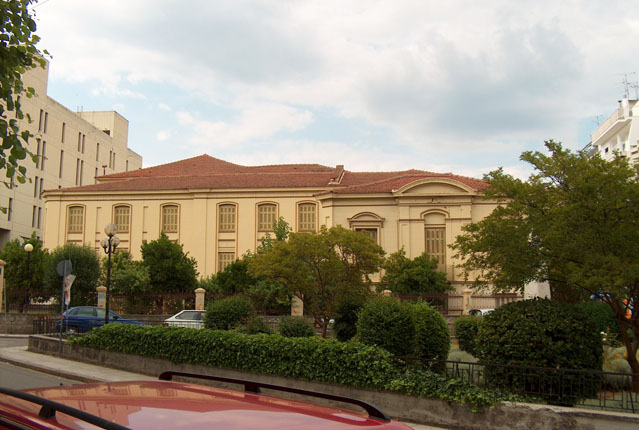
Papastratos storehouses

The extended municipality of Agrinio was formed during the 2011 local government reform by the merger of the following 10 former municipalities, that became municipal units:

- Agrinio
- Angelokastro
- Arakynthos
- Makryneia
- Neapoli
- Panaitoliko
- Parakampylia
- Paravola
- Stratos
- Thestieis

The municipality has an area of 1229.330 km^{2}, the municipal unit 162.728 km^{2}.

=== Subdivisions ===
The municipal unit (former municipality) of Agrinio consists of the following communities:

- Agios Konstantinos
- Agios Nikolaos Trichonidos
- Agrinio
- Dokimi
- Kalyvia
- Kamaroula
- Skoutesiada

The city of Agrinio consists of the main city and the outlying villages Agios Ioannis Riganas, Akropotamos, Bouzi, Giannouzi, Diamanteika, Eleftheria, Lefka, Liagkaiika, Pyrgi, Schinos and Strongylaiika.

=== City seal ===
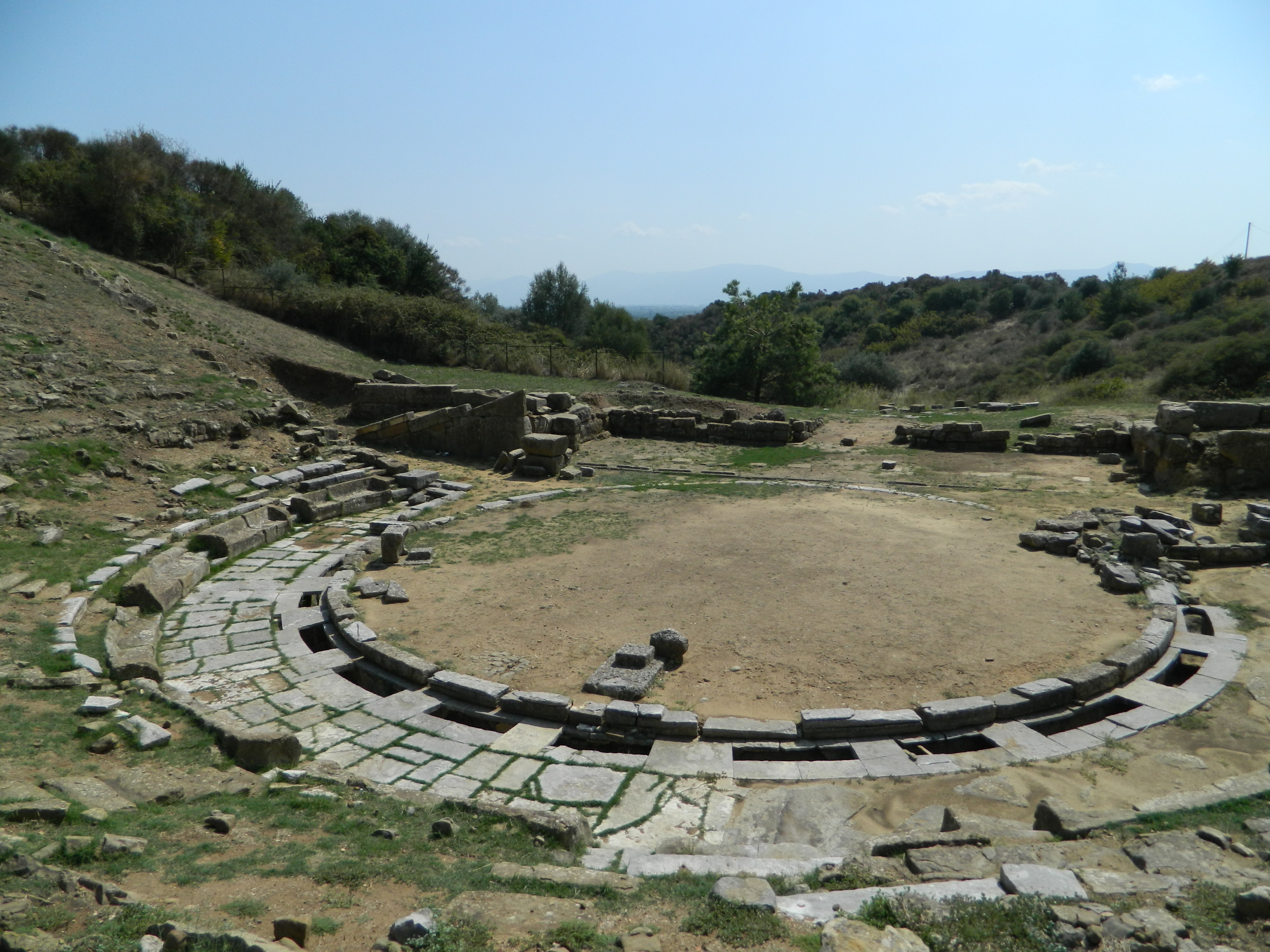
Stratos ancient theater

The city's official seal includes a characteristic moment of the ancient Greek mythology. More specifically, the seal depicts Hercules fighting the river god Achelous. According to the myth, Hercules fought against the river god for the sake of Diianira, the princess of Calydon, which both of them wanted as a wife. Despite Achelous' transformations, Hercules managed to win the battle and married the princess. According to Strabo, the myth symbolises the struggle of ancient Aetolians to control the river's power with embankments, by which the river was confined to its bed and thus the area gained large tracts of land for cultivation.

== Historical population ==
Year	Town	Municipal unit	Municipality
1971	32,190	39,667	-
1981	35,773	45,087	-
1991	39,638	52,081	-
2001	42,390	54,523	-
2011	48,645	59,329	94,181
2021	50,690	60,609	89,691

== Landmarks ==
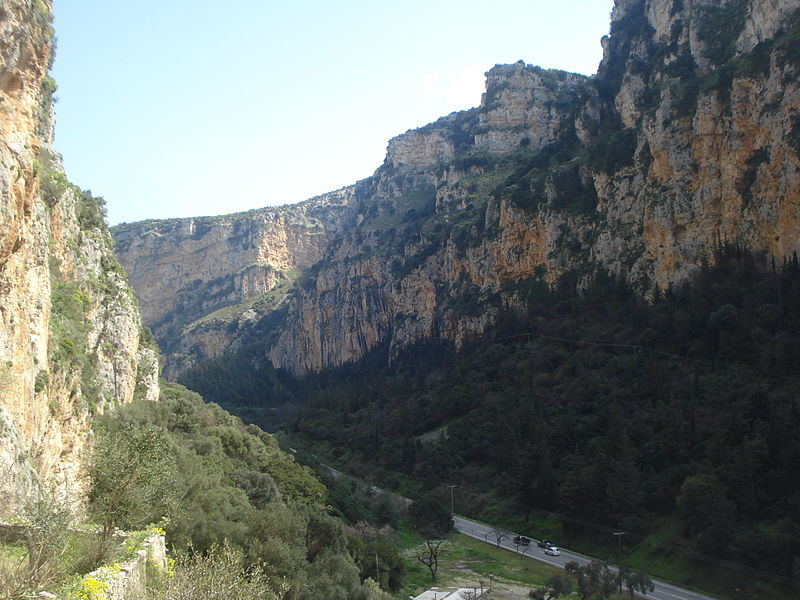
The gorge of Kleisoura.

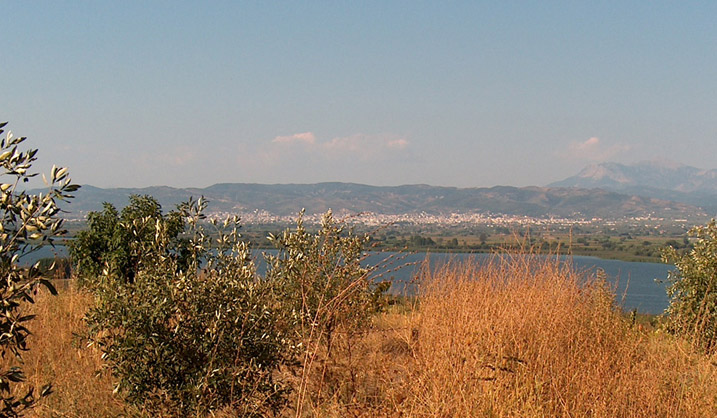
Lysimachia Lake

- The Archaeological Museum of Agrinion, located in the city center, at 1-2 Diamantis Street. website
- The neoclassical buildings of the tobacco storehouses Papastratos and Papapetrou, which date from the early 20th century.
- The Papastrateio Municipal Park.
- The Papastratios Municipal Library.
- The Dimokratias Square, the main square of the city.
- The remains of the Church of the Holy Trinity of Mavrika (8th-9th century), situated at the banks of lake Lysimachia.
- Lakes Trichonida and Lysimachia.
- The ancient city of Stratos.
- The gorge of Kleisoura, on the old national road, 15 kilometres (9 miles) south of the city.
- The hydroelectric dams of Kremasta, Kastraki and Stratos.

== Mayors ==
- Georgios Baibas (1899–1907)
- Andreas Panagopoulos (1925–1934 and 1951–1952)
- Dimitrios Votsis (1934–1941)
- Anastasios Panagopoulos (1964–1967)
- Stelios Tsitsimelis (1975–1986)
- Giannis Vainas (1986–1994)
- Thimios Sokos (1994–2006)
- Pavlos Moscholios (2006–2014)
- Georgios Papanastasiou (2014–present)

== Famous citizens ==
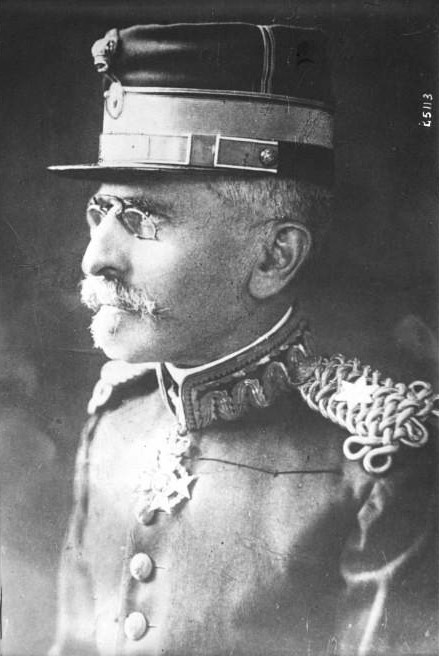
Panagiotis Danglis

- Stratos Apostolakis (1964) – footballer
- Petros Michos (1959) – footballer
- Kostas Chatzopoulos (1868–1920) – poet
- Christos Garoufalis (1959) – writer
- Katia Gerou – actress
- Panagiotis Danglis (1853–1924) – general and politician
- Filipos Darlas (1983) – footballer
- Maria Dimadi (1907–1944) – member of EAM
- Petros Fyssoun (1933) – actor
- Panos Kaponis (Caponis) (1947) – poet & writer
- Christos Kapralos (1909–1993) – artist
- Michalis Kousis (1953–2005) – Marathon runner
- Aristidis Moschos (1930–2001) – musician
- Pythagoras Papastamatiou (1930–1979) – writer
- Thodoros (1931–2018) – sculptor
- Evangelos Papastratos (1910–1988) – industrialist and benefactor of Agrinio
- Loukia Pistiola – actress
- Yiannis Yfantis (1949) – poet
- Kostis Maraveyas (1974) – singer and composer
- Spiros and Eleni Tsiknia – Benefactors of Agrinio
- Aristovoulos Kois – Greek army officer

== Sporting teams ==
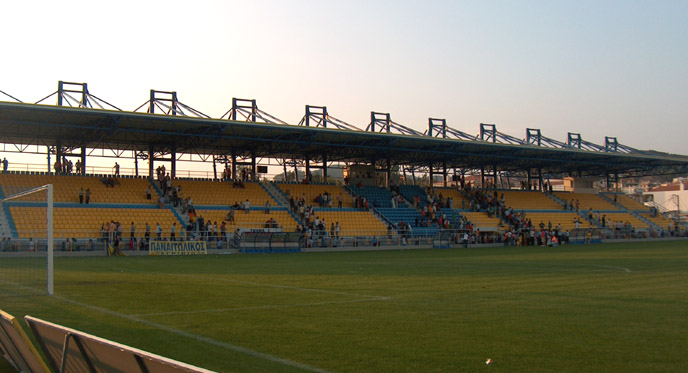
Panetolikos Stadium

- Panetolikos – Super League Greece
- Panagriniakos – Gamma Ethniki
- Gymnastiki Etairia Agriniou (G.E.A.)
- A.O. Agriniou
- Ionikos 80 Volleyball
- Nautikos Omilos
- Asteras Agriniou

== Gallery ==
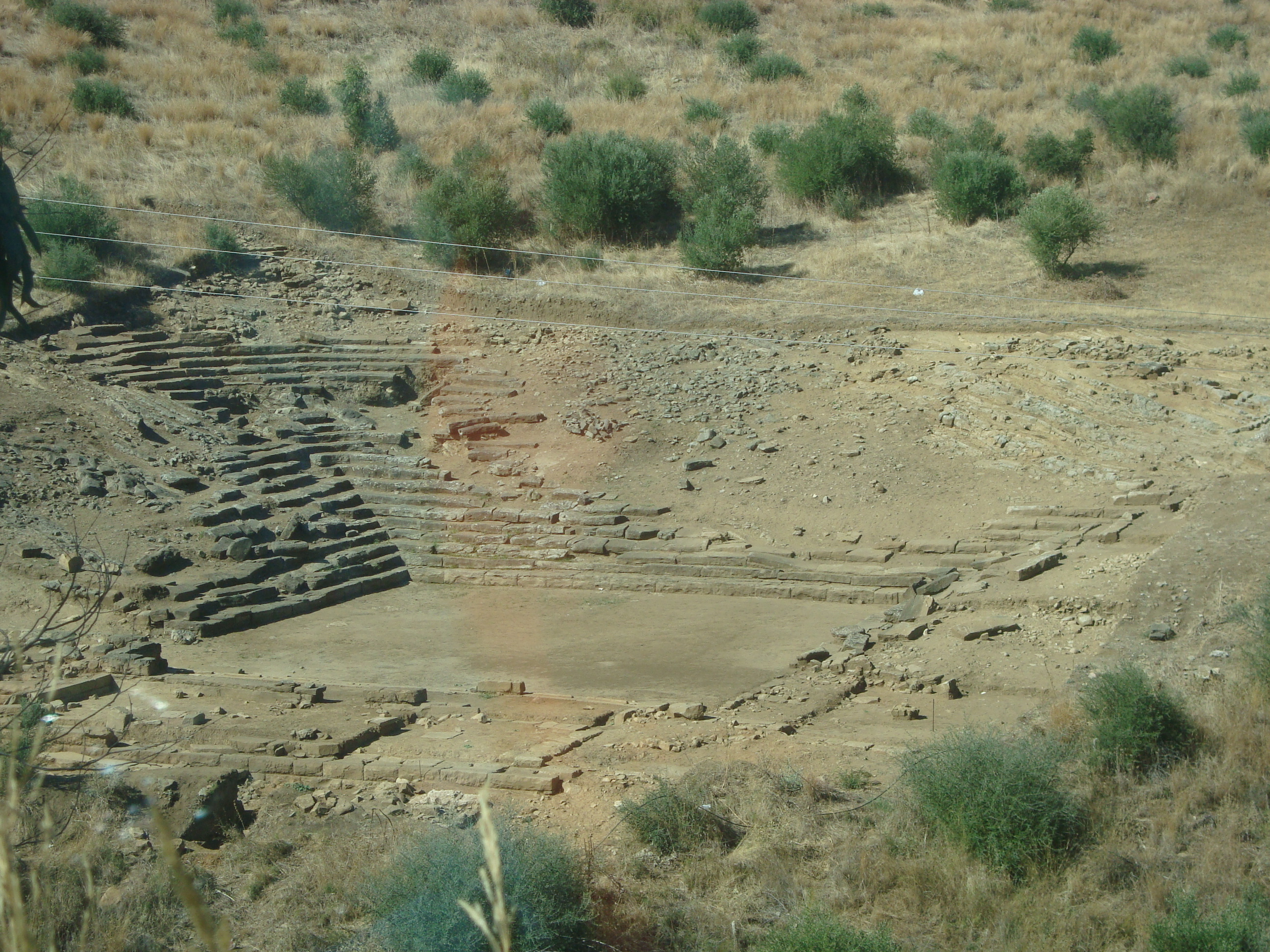
The ancient theatre of Calydon near Evinochori

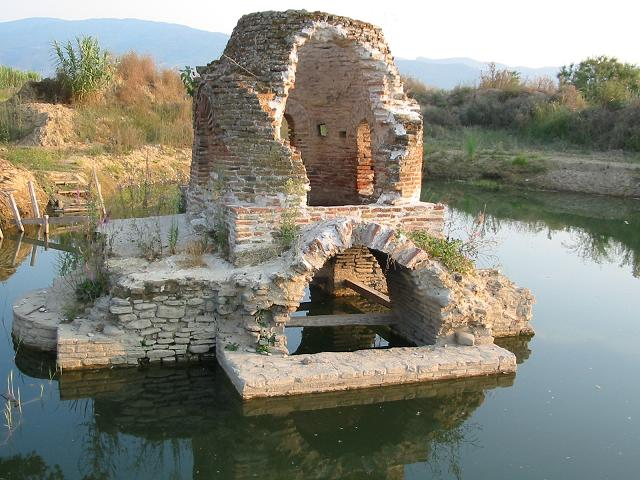
Agia Triada Maurika Byzantine church

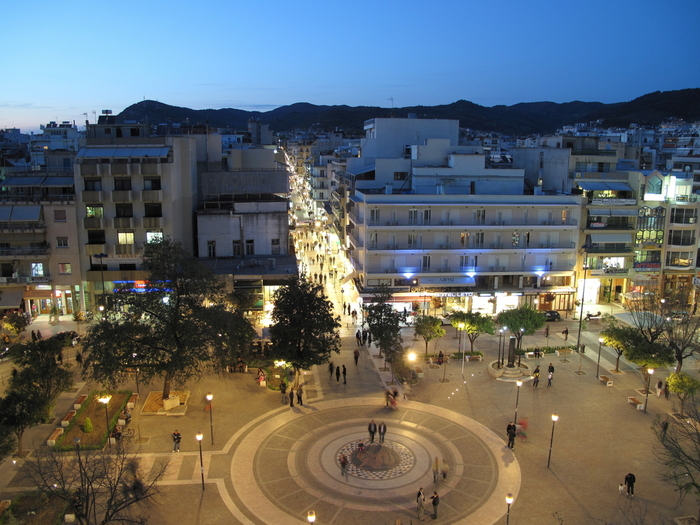
Central square, Κεντρική Πλατεία Αγρινίου (Dimokratias square)

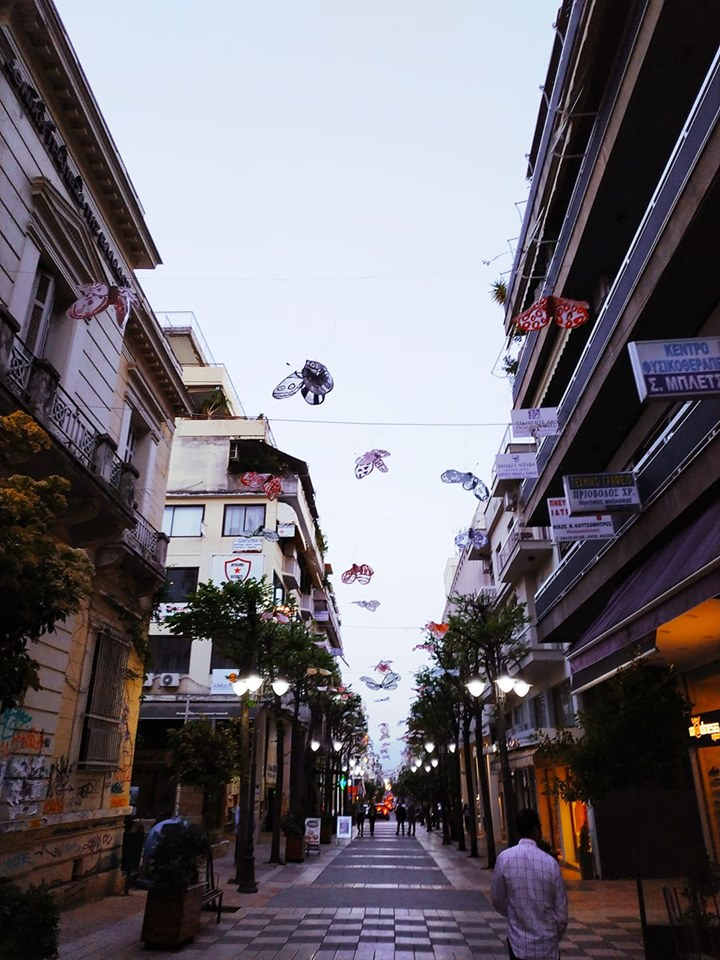
Charilaou Trikoupi street

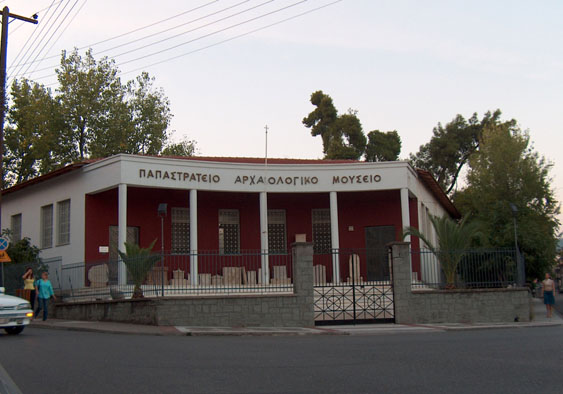
Agrinio Archaeological museum

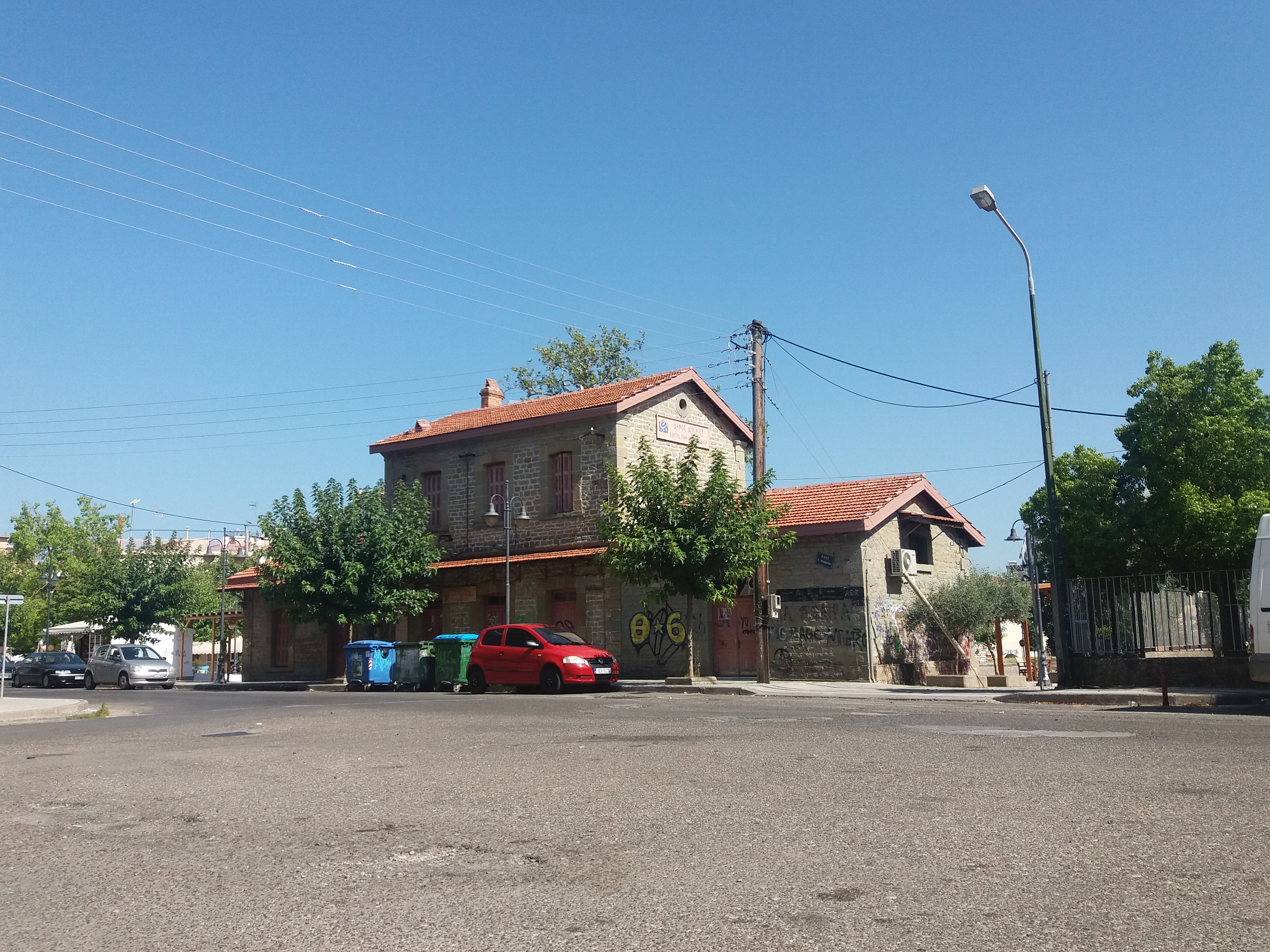
Old railway station

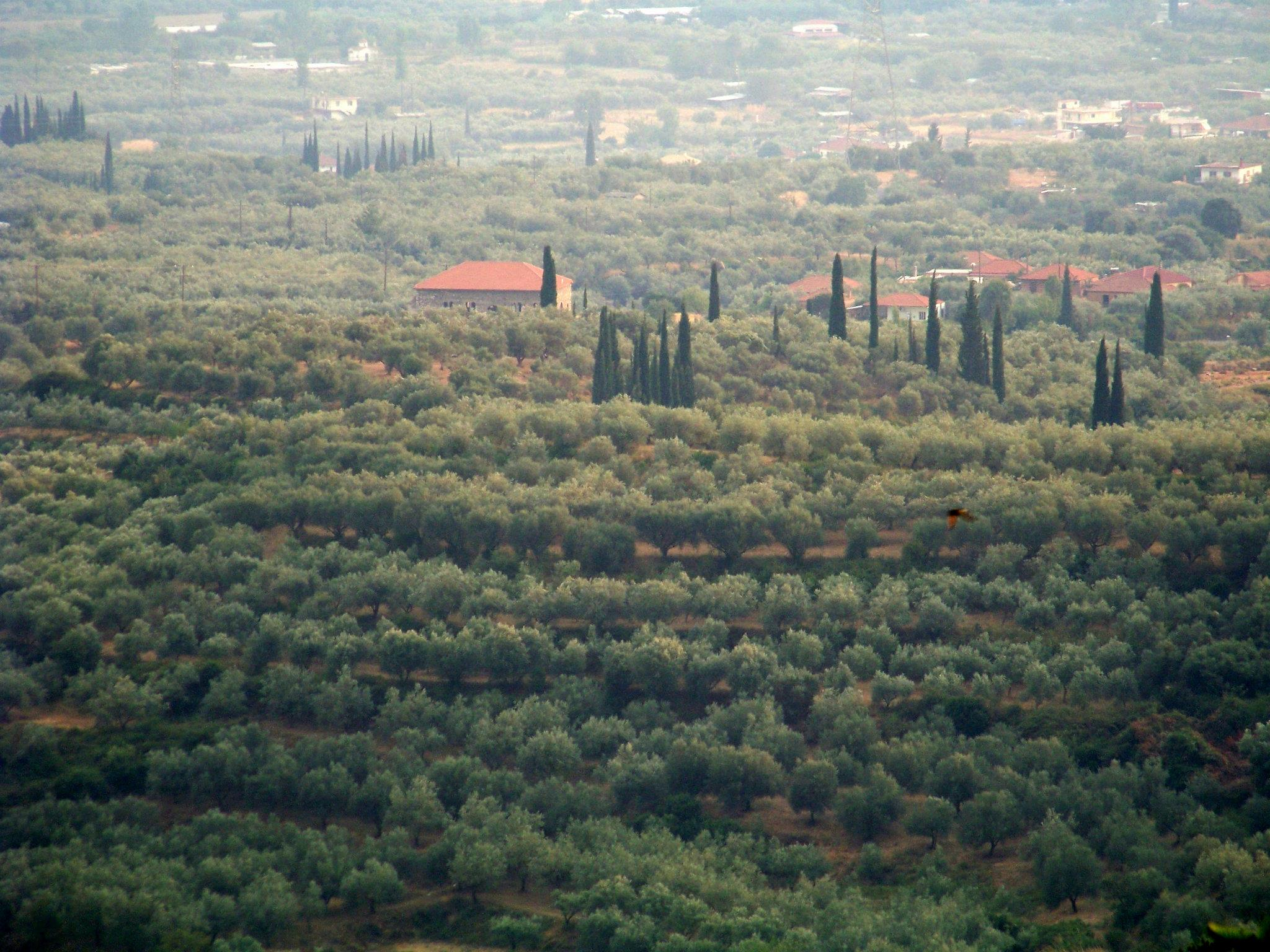
Rural area in the municipality of Agrinio

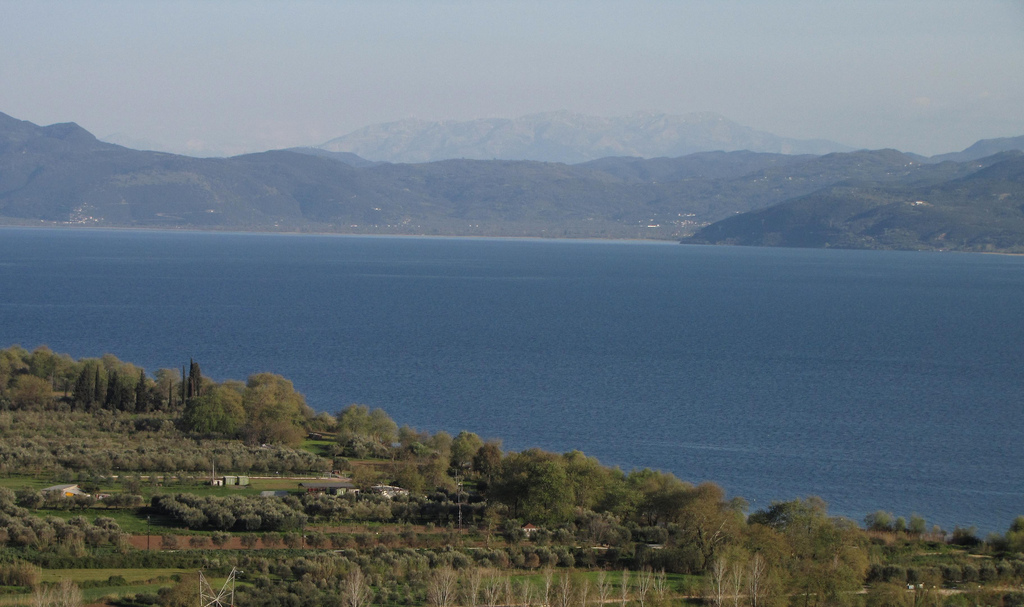
Trichonida Lake

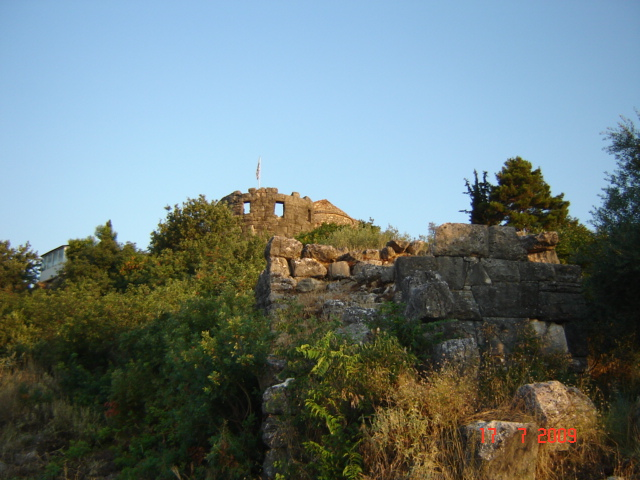
Voukatio castle, Paravola

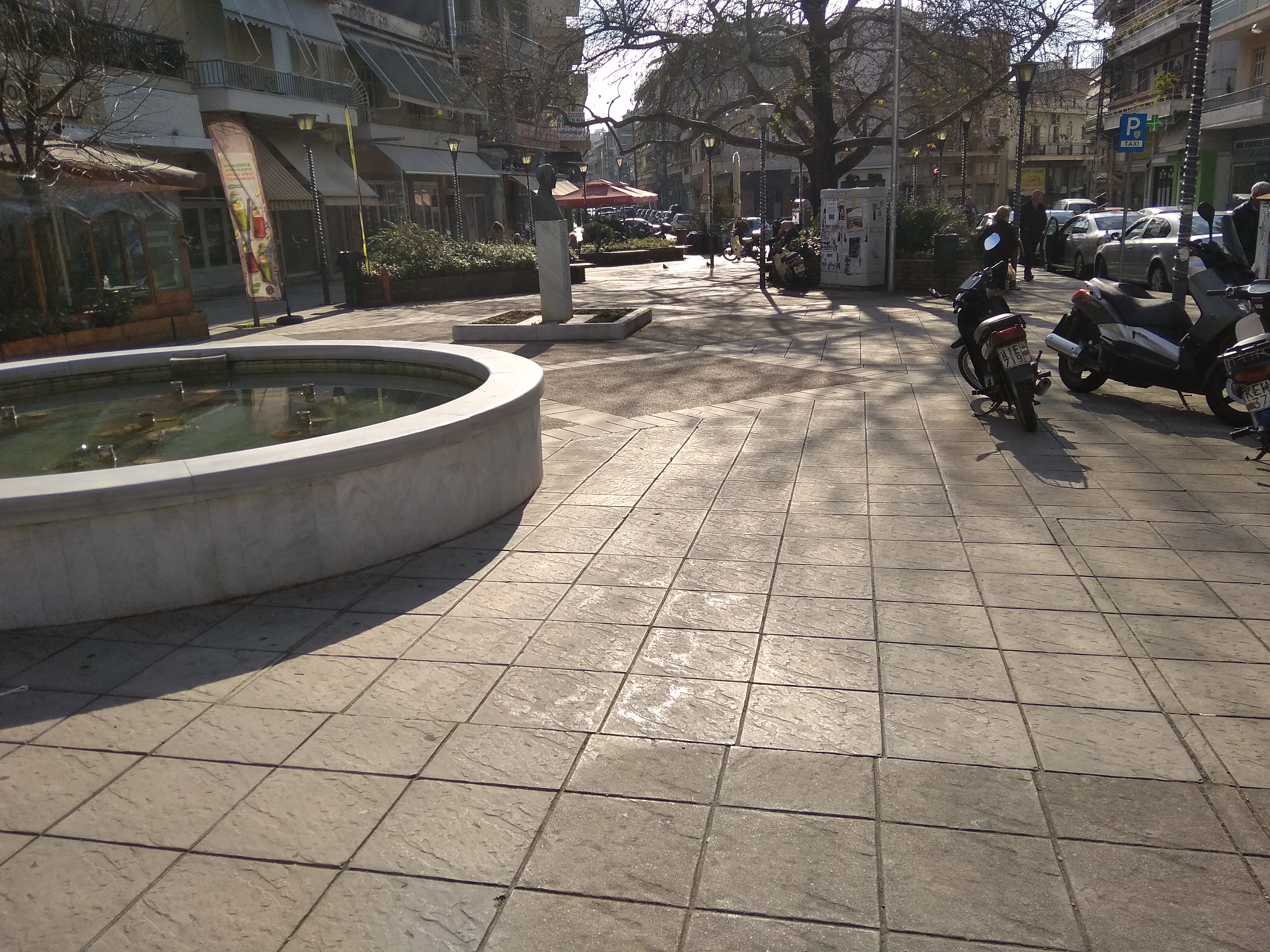
Hatzopoulou Square

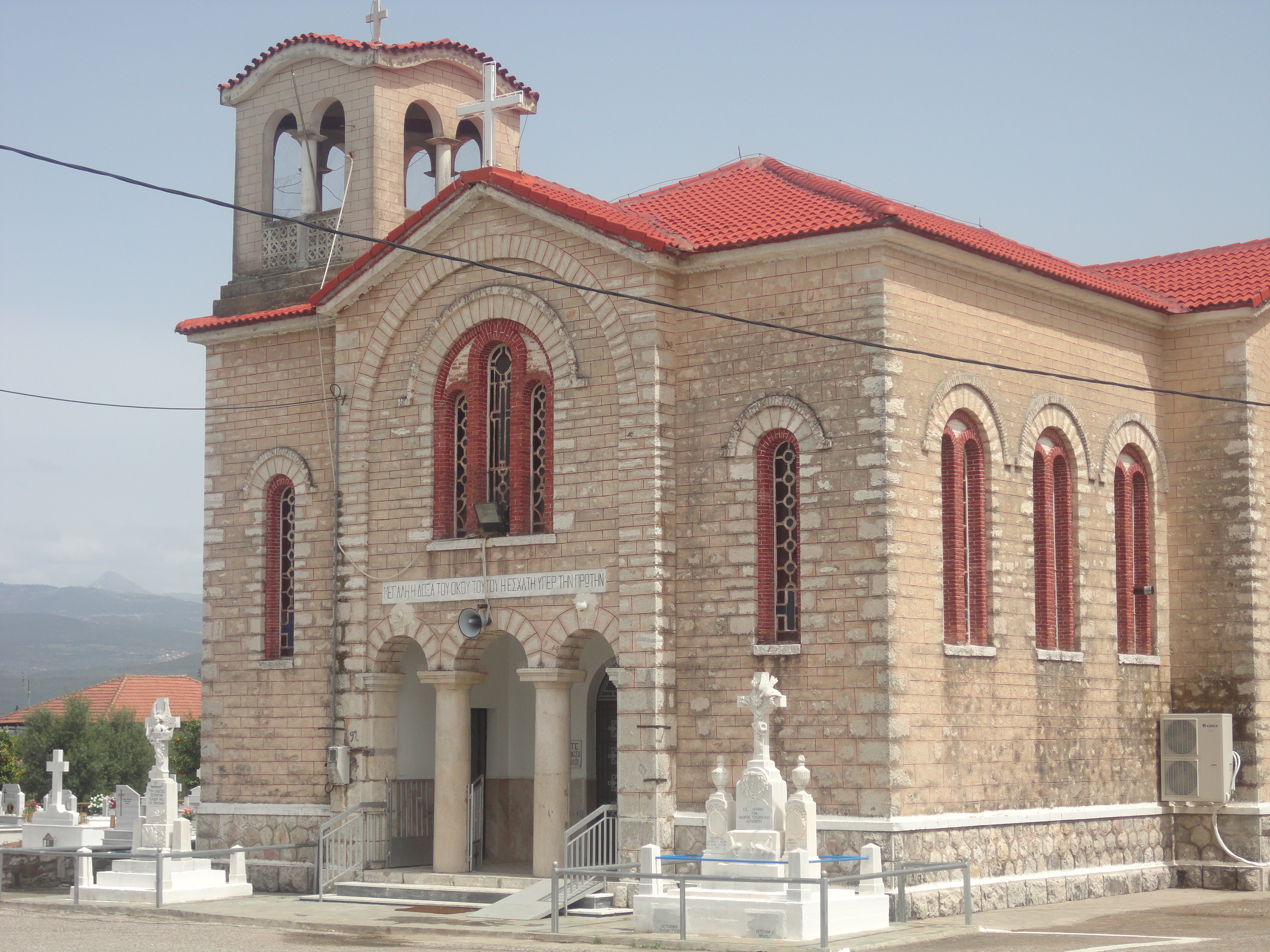
Saint John church, Dafnias

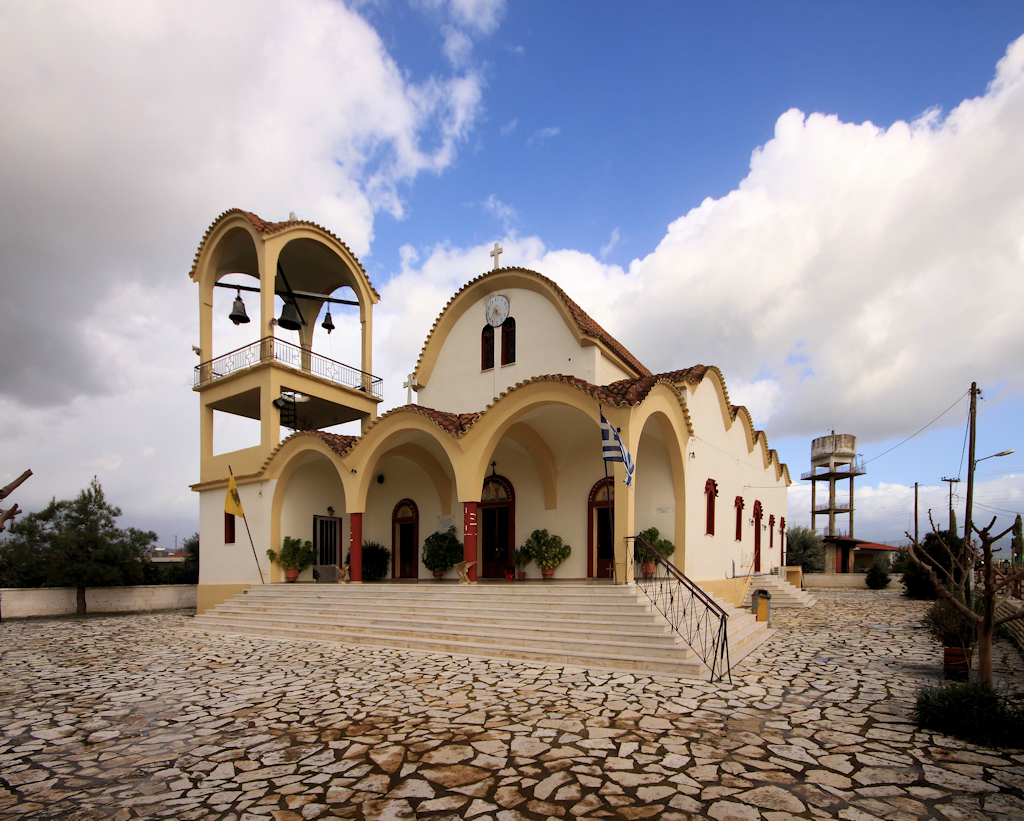
Annunciation church

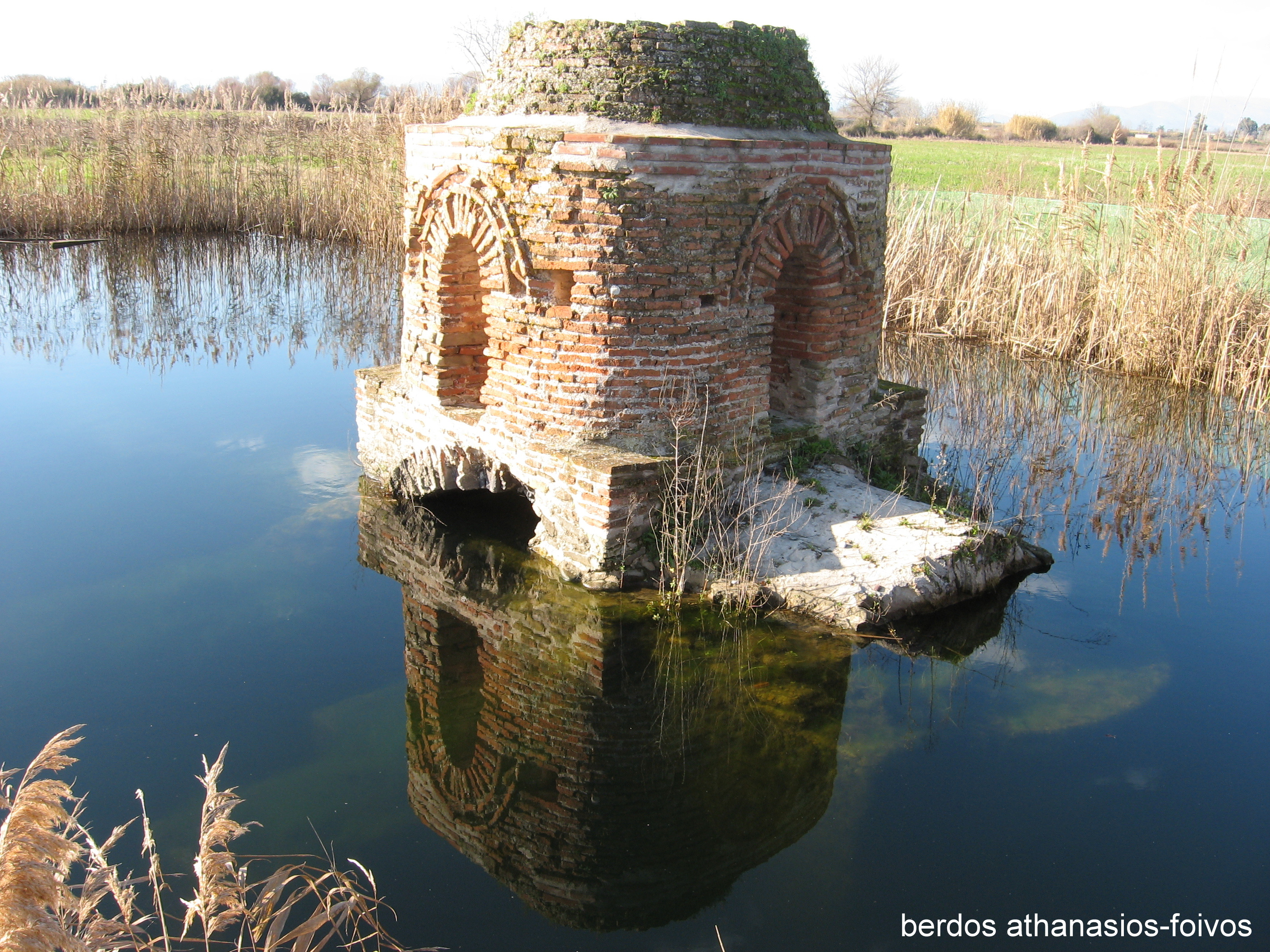
Agia Triada Maurika (another angle)

== See also ==
- List of settlements in Aetolia-Acarnania
- List of ancient Greek cities
