= Judge Howard =

Judge Howard may refer to:

- Alex T. Howard Jr. (1924–2011), judge of the United States District Court for the Southern District of Alabama
- Clinton Woodbury Howard (1864–1937), judge of the United States District Court for the Western District of Washington
- George Howard Jr. (1924–2007), judge of the United States District Court for the Eastern and Western Districts of Arkansas
- Jeffrey R. Howard (born 1955), judge of the United States Court of Appeals for the First Circuit
- Joseph C. Howard Sr. (1922–2000), judge of the United States District Court for the District of Maryland
- Malcolm Jones Howard (born 1939), judge of the United States District Court for the Eastern District of North Carolina
- Marcia Morales Howard (born 1965), judge of the United States District Court for the Middle District of Florida

== See also ==
- Justice Howard (disambiguation)
