= Dimokratias Square (Agrinio) =

Square in Agrinio, Greece

Coordinates: 38.6248°N 21.4095°E

Dimokratias Square (Greek: Πλατεία Δημοκρατίας, Plateia Dimokratias, "Democracy Square") is the central square of the city of Agrinio.

The square was created in 1879 when Michail Bellos (Μιχαήλ Μπέλλος) was mayor, and was long named Bellou Square (Πλατεία Μπέλλου) after him. On Good Friday 1944, the German occupation authorities hung Avraam Anastasiadis, Panos Soulos and Christos Salakos from the square's lamp-posts. Today, three roads leading to the square are named after them.
