= Evangelos Papastratos =

Evangelos Papastratos (Greek: Ευάγγελος Παπαστράτος, 1910 – 1998) was a Greek businessman born in the city of Agrinio in Aetolia-Acarnania, Greece.

Although the youngest of his brothers, he was the first in his family to become involved with the tobacco trade. Along with his brother Sotirios he founded the Papastratiou Brothers firm, one of the biggest tobacco companies in Greece until the rise in foreign cigarette imports in the 1970s and the 1980s. Papastratos also wrote a book called I douleia kai o kopos tis (Η δουλειά και ο κόπος της).
