= Papastratos =

Greek tobacco company

Papastratos Παπαστράτος ΑΒΕΣ
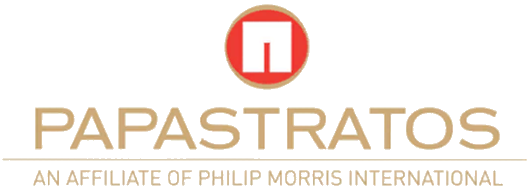
- Type: Subsidiary
- Industry: Tobacco
- Founded: 1930; 96 years ago
- Founder: Evangelos Papastratos
- Headquarters: Aspropyrgos, Athens, Greece
- Area served: Greece, East Europe
- Products: Cigarettes
- Number of employees: 800 (2015)
- Parent: Philip Morris International

Papastratos (Greek: Παπαστράτος Ανώνυμη Βιομηχανική Εταιρεία Σιγαρέττων) is a Greek tobacco company and is the largest manufacturer and distributor of cigarettes in Greece. The company was formed in 1930 by Evangelos Papastratos with its first factory located in Piraeus. Its second factory opened in 1933 in Berlin but was forced to close in 1936 under pressure from the Nazi regime. In 1937, the company opened its third factory in Cairo, which closed in 1955.

In its heyday the company was one of the largest industrial producers in Greece. Whole communities (such as Agrinio) flourished from the tobacco plantations supplying Papastratos factories.

The company began a co-operation with Philip Morris in 1975 and was purchased by it in 2003. In 2009, a new factory was inaugurated in the area of Aspropyrgos, an investment of more than €100 million, with a production capacity of 20 billion cigarettes annually. Papastratos S.A. owns a tobacco warehouse facility at Agrinio as well.

Cigarette brands produced by Papastratos include Assos International and Old Navy.
