= Sergei Simonov (ice hockey) =

Russian ice hockey player

- Born: July 25, 1992 Novokuznetsk, Russia
- Died: January 7, 2016 (aged 23) Nizhny Tagil, Russia
- Height: 5 ft 9 in (175 cm)
- Weight: 185 lb (84 kg; 13 st 3 lb)
- Position: Centre
- Shot: Left
- VHL team Former teams: HC Lipetsk; Metallurg Novokuznetsk (KHL)
- NHL draft: Undrafted
- Playing career: 2010–2016

Sergei Sergeevich Simonov (Russian: Сepгeй Сepгeeвич Симoнoв; July 25, 1992 – January 7, 2016) was a Russian professional ice hockey player. He played with HC Lipetsk of the Russian Hockey League.

Simonov played three games with Metallurg Novokuznetsk of the Kontinental Hockey League during the 2010–11 season. He died after spleen surgery on January 7, 2016, at the age of 23.
