= Justice Howard =

American photographer

- Born: San Francisco
- Known for: Photography

Justice Howard (born in San Francisco, California) is an American photographer whose work includes shooting erotica, pin-up and celebrities. Her work has appeared in over 50 hardcover books and in thousands of magazines including Vogue Paris, Esquire, Easyriders, Playboy, Cosmopolitan, People, In Touch Weekly, Skin Two, and a 25-page spread in Bound by Ink, as well as being displayed in over 60 art gallery exhibits and numerous museum shows. She has also been featured in DankLook's "On Women in Black and White Fine Art Photography." Her photography features themes of female empowerment, freedom, and inner strength. She was previously a model before "graduating to photography" and training under a German master photographer. Her work has been compared to that of Annie Leibovitz and Herb Ritts.

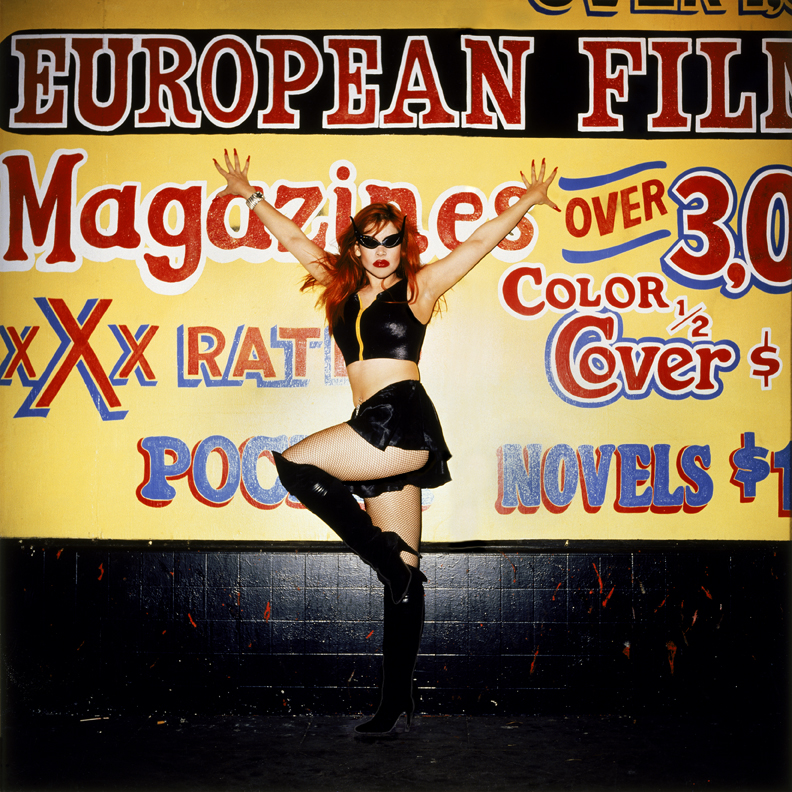

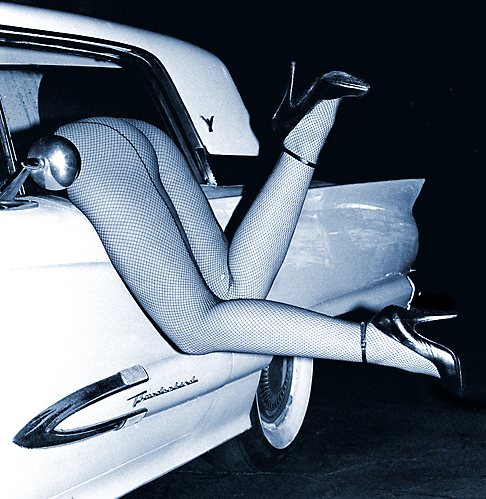

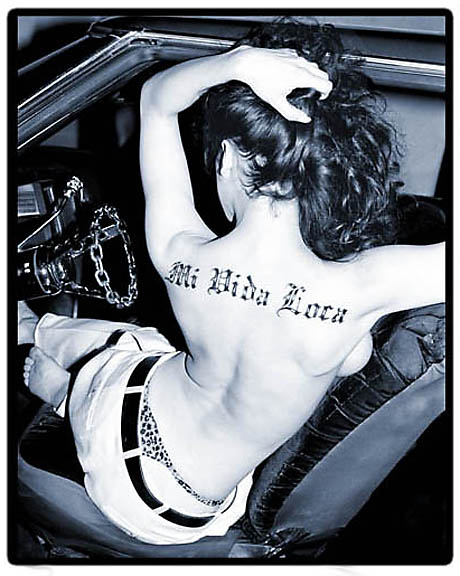

== Photography ==
Howard is credited as the last photographer to capture living photographs of country musician Waylon Jennings before his death in 2002. The photoshoot was arranged by ex-Hells Angels President Sonny Barger, a mutual friend of both Howard and Jennings, and took place just before a performance by the singer at the New Orleans casino in Las Vegas about four months prior to his death. Howard has also shot many other musicians including Dave Navarro, Marilyn Manson, Billy Idol, Willie Nelson, Steve Jones, Estelle Asmodelle and Dick Dale, as well as pin-up icon and cult classic actress Mamie Van Doren, then in her 70s. The Lord Balfour Hotel in Miami, Florida, showcases 64 of her images in 30-foot wall murals, and has rugs designed from her photographs. Tattoo Bar in Washington DC, which while not owned by Howard, is filled with her art. She was rated one of the top 10 tattoo photographers in the world by Rank My Tattoos and in 2013 released a Lady Ink calendar, which has been described as the "glamour calendar with a downtown edge". She has had over 25 calendars to her credit.

Her first camera was a Pentax Spotmatic II that was very basic, followed by a Nikon camera that Howard "fell in love with". She started out as primarily a fetish photographer at a time when fetish photography was not yet well known, before moving on to incorporate other styles into her work. Howard's work has been described as "more modern works of art than mere photographs", and is known internationally. Her portfolio includes over two million images, and one of her collector-owned fine art photographs was appraised at $40,000.

== Influences ==
Howard cites Helmut Newton as a major influence of her work, a statement she has made in multiple interviews; she has also been called the "female Helmut Newton". Additionally, she is influenced by the work of Robert Mapplethorpe and Mark Seliger.

== Gallery and museum work ==
In 1995 Howard had her first one-woman gallery show in Los Angeles, "Black & White & Brutal", which presented her "fetish and kink-oriented imagery" to a receptive audience. Since then she has had over 60 art gallery exhibitions, including a downtown LA show titled "Sharp Edges" with crime writer John Gilmore, in which all the art was stuck to the walls with custom knives. An exhibition of her work titled 'Alice in Thunderland' opened in early 2011 at the World Erotic Art Museum in Florida marking a graduation of Howard's work from art galleries to museums. Her work is also featured on the walls of the Lord Balfour Hotel in South Beach, Florida. Sixty-four of its rooms house Howard art, and the rooms have been decorated to match the colors in her photographs. 30-foot murals grace the rooms and some rooms showcase easel-based art within the master suites.

- HARDCOVER BOOKS

Howard's Photography has been published in:

(2023) Sinister Party (A Horror Compendium) published by Asylum Publications ((ISBN 979-8-9878152-0-5)) https://www.asylumpublications.com/store/sinister-party-by-justice-howard (2023) Diary of a Hitman...available in hardcover on Amazon https://www.amazon.com/Diary-Hitman-around-darkness-Justice-ebook/dp/B08K3SF7H4/ref=sr_1_1?crid=1KX8AKX3V1BJJ&keywords=diary+of+a+hitman+justice&qid=1684378421&sprefix=diary+of+a+hitman+justice%2Caps%2C774&sr=8-1 (2018) Voodoo – Conjure & Sacrifice – hardcover by Schiffer Publishing ISBN 9780764355189 https://www.amazon.com/Justice-Howards-Voodoo-Conjure-Sacrifice/dp/076435518X/ref=sr_1_1?crid=YY3MZ0FK223I&keywords=voodoo+justice+howard&qid=1684378590&sprefix=voodoo+justice+howard%2Caps%2C208&sr=8-1

- (2017) Renegades – The Photography of Justice Howard – SOLD OUT - hardcover ISBN 978-0-7643-5224-9
- (2017) Sonny: 60 Years Hells Angels- Sonny Barger Retrospective – Serious Publishing, France
- (2015) Revelations – The Photography of Justice Howard – hardcover by Schiffer Publishing ISBN 9780764347986
- (2016) TERRIBLE THINGS - My story of serial killer GJ Schaefer hardcover on Amazon
- (2013) Tattoo Art' – Flametree Press ISBN 978-0-85-775603-9
- (2010) Star Guitars – Voyageur Press. ISBN 0-7603-3821-3
- (2006) Van Gogh's Ear: The Celebrity Edition – Gazelle Distribution Trade. ISBN 978-2-914853-07-1
- (2002) Sex: Take a Walk on the Wild Side: Masterpieces of Erotic Fantasy Photography – Thunder's Mouth Press. ISBN 978-1-56025-363-1
- (2002) Blonde: Masterpieces of Photography – Thunder's Mouth Press. ISBN 978-1-56025-417-1
- (2001) Hell's Angel: The Life and Times of Sonny Barger and the Hell's Angels Motorcycle Club – Harper Paperbacks. ISBN 978-0-06-093754-6
- (2001) Julie Strain's Greatest Hits – Heavy Metal Magazine. ISBN 978-1-882931-71-2
- (2000) Fetish Photo Anthology Volume 3 – Glitter. ASIN B003VKRMQQ
- (2000) Extreme: Photo Anthology of Extreme Lifestyles – Glitter. ASIN B00106XH44
- (1997) Fetish Photo Anthology Volume 2 – Secret magazine. ASIN B001DJ84KU

== Personal life ==
Howard once choreographed a show in Las Vegas that was awarded Best Number in Show after opening night review. She is a supporter of the charity organization Children of the Night and provides her time teaching the children photography as well as raising money through charity shows featuring her work. She works for eight fashion and lifestyle magazines both in U.S. and Europe, and she also works out of her studio in Hollywood.'
