= Luigi Silori =

Italian literary critic

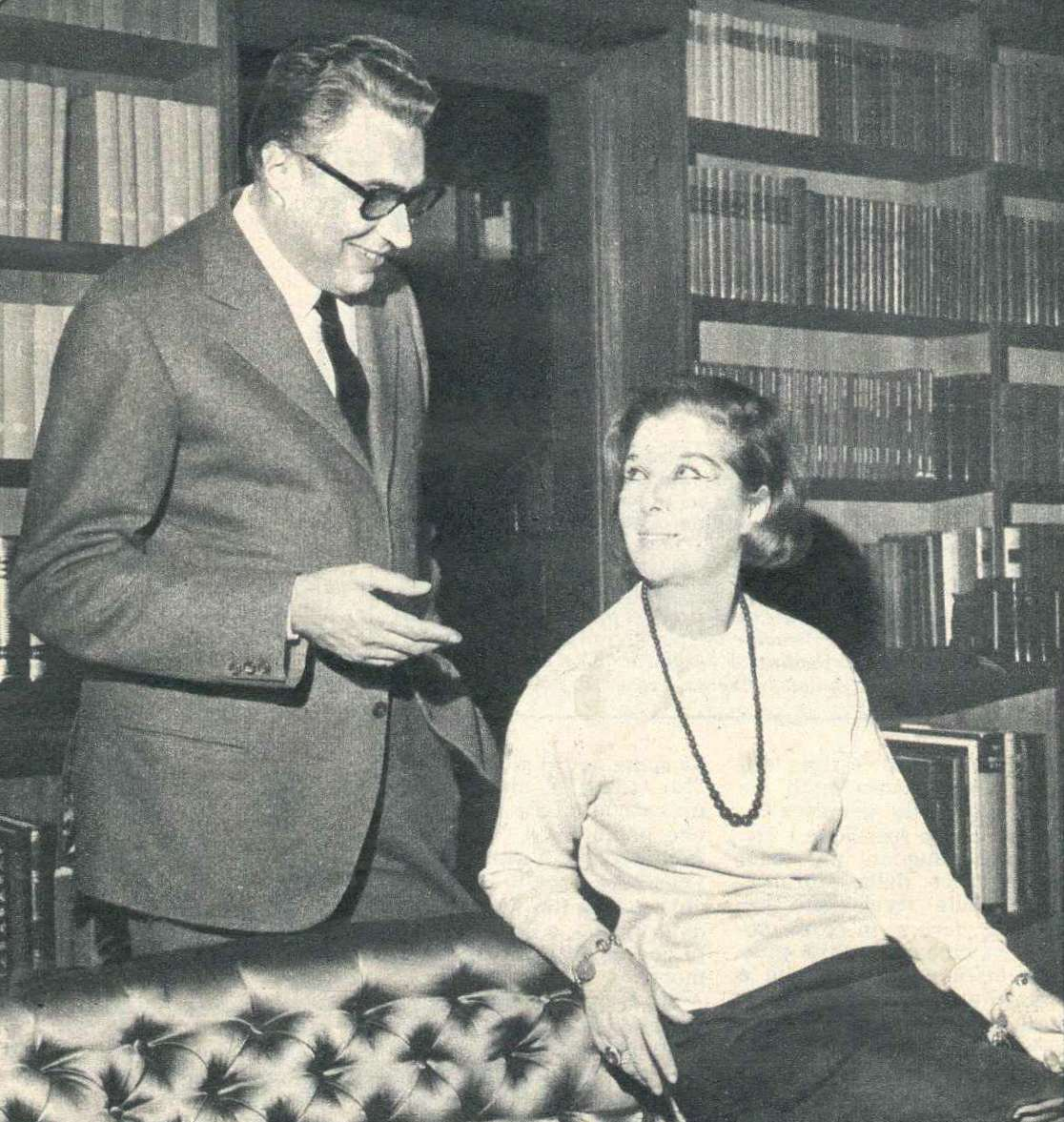
- Luigi Silori with Italian actress Elsa De Giorgi
- Born: Luigi Silori; 19 November 1921; Rome, Italy
- Died: 9 July 1983 (aged 61); Rome, Italy
- Occupations: short story writer, literary critic, television personality, playwright

Luigi Silori (19 November 1921 – 9 July 1983) was an Italian literary critic, novelist, playwright, and a popular radio and television personality in the 1950s and 1960s.

Descended from an old Umbrian family, at the beginning of his university studies Silori was called to military service and spent four years in the Italian army during World War II. Silori served in the ill-fated Acqui Division, and was a survivor of the Cephalonia Massacre. After 1945, he graduated in Literature and started to write novels and theatrical texts. In 1954 he began appearing on both television and radio, and became very popular in Italy as "the man who introduced the books on TV".

== Biography ==
=== Early life and education ===
Luigi Silori was born in Rome in 1921, an only son. His father, Fernando, was a landowner in Stifone, and a descendant of an old family from Narni. His mother, Antonietta Pacchelli, was a school teacher, who graduated in Rome in 1901, when such a thing was very uncommon for a woman in Italy. She was also a piano teacher and writer.

Silori lived in an old house in Rome's middle-class Quartiere Trieste. After primary school, he attended a distinguished grammar school, the classical gymnasium Torquato Tasso, where he had brilliant classmates, like the actor Vittorio Gassman (who was his friend for decades) and the theater director Luigi Squarzina.

=== World War II ===
At the beginning of 1941, when he was still 19 years old, Silori was called up to serve as a gunnery lieutenant of the Italian Army in Greece with the 33rd Mountain Infantry Division "Acqui", which occupied the island of Cephalonia during the Greco-Italian War. Following the Italian surrender on 8 September 1943, thousands of soldiers from the division were murdered on the islands during Operation Achse, in what became known as the Cephalonia Massacre, one of the largest prisoner of war massacres during the war and one of the largest-scale German atrocities to be committed by Wehrmacht troops. Silori was one of the few officers who, by the end, had not been gunned down by the Wehrmacht, and he was subsequently deported to Germany and sent to the concentration camp at Meppen-Fullen.

=== Last years and death ===
Silori died in Rome on 9 July 1983, aged 61. He left behind his wife Daisy, after 38 years of marriage, and his only son Fernando, aged 27.
