= Luigi Gherzi =

Italian general (1889–1943)

- Born: 27 September 1889; Lu Monferrato, Kingdom of Italy
- Died: 22 September 1943 (aged 53); Kefalonia, Greece
- Military career
- Allegiance: Kingdom of Italy
- Branch: Royal Italian Army
- Rank: Brigadier General
- Commands: 68th Infantry Regiment "Legnano"
- Conflicts: Italo-Turkish War; World War I; World War II; Greco-Italian War; Yugoslav Front; Battle of Kefalonia
- Awards: Gold Medal of Military Valor (posthumous)

Luigi Edoardo Alfredo Gherzi (27 September 1889 – 22 September 1943) was an Italian general during World War II.

== Biography ==
He was born in Lu Monferrato, province of Alessandria, on 27 September 1889, the son of farmer Alberto Gherzi and Savina Borghino. After graduating as an accountant, he enlisted in the Royal Italian Army, taking part in the Italo-Turkish War and then in the First World War. In the late 1930s, with the rank of colonel, he assumed command of the 68th Infantry Regiment "Palermo", stationed in Novara, which in 1939 was renamed 68th Infantry Regiment "Legnano", part of the 58th Infantry Division "Legnano", and transferred to Legnano.

At the outbreak of World War II, the regiment was kept in reserved on the western front, and in March 1941, it left for the Greek front, where it fought under Gherzi's command until May of the same year. Later in 1941, he assumed the position of Chief of Staff of the 26th Infantry Division "Assietta", and in 1942 he was transferred to the Territorial Defense Command of Florence, with responsibility for coastal defence. On 1 July 1942, he was promoted to Brigadier General and on 21 July he assumed the command of the infantry of the 154th Infantry Division "Murge", stationed in Yugoslavia. In February 1943, while he was acting commander of the Division, he suffered a serious defeat in Herzegovina at the hand of the partisans, which destroyed the 259th Infantry Regiment, and was therefore replaced by General Bartolomeo Pedrotti and subjected to an investigation. On 7 June 1943, he assumed command of the divisional infantry of the 33rd Infantry Division "Acqui", with headquarters on the island of Kefalonia.

At the time of the signing of the armistice of Cassibile, on 8 September 1943, he was at his command in Argostoli, where the divisional command was also located. With the worsening of relations with the Germans the divisional commander, General Antonio Gandin, decided to separate the two commands, transferring them to two distinct locations, for security reasons. Gandin moved to the village of Razata, while Gherzi moved to Kokkolata, near Kerameies. During the subsequent fighting between the Italian and German troops, on 22 September 1943 his command was attacked with mortars and surrounded by German soldiers who broke inside it; Lieutenant Colonel Sebastiano Sebastiani, who had tried to draw his service pistol, was shot dead on the doorstep, while General Gherzi, his adjutant Lieutenant Guido Dal Monte, and four other officers were captured. They were taken out of the building and shot in the back on the edge of the nearby anti-tank ditch, together with second lieutenants Alberto Drago and Alfredo Porcelli. Eyewitnesses reported that at the moment of the execution Gherzi turned and uncovered his chest, shouting "Long live Italy, long live the King". He was posthumously awarded the Gold Medal of Military Valor, and his remains, exhumed in 1944, were reburied in Novara.
