= Hartwig von Ludwiger =

Nazi German general during World War II

- Born: 29 June 1895
- Died: 3 or 5 May 1947 (aged 51); Belgrade, Yugoslavia
- Military career
- Allegiance: German Empire; Weimar Republic; Nazi Germany
- Branch: German Army
- Service years: 1914–1945
- Rank: Generalleutnant
- Commands: 704th Infantry Division; 104th Jäger Division; XXI Army Corps
- Conflicts: World War I Silesian Uprisings; World War II: Battle of France; Operation Barbarossa; Battle of Moscow; Crimean Campaign; World War II in Yugoslavia
- Awards: Knight's Cross of the Iron Cross with Oak Leaves

Hartwig von Ludwiger (29 June 1895 – 3 or 5 May 1947) was a German general in the Wehrmacht of Nazi Germany during World War II. Ludwiger was responsible for numerous atrocities committed throughout the Balkans. After the war, he was charged with war crimes in Yugoslavia, convicted, and executed.

== World War I and interwar period ==
Hartwig von Ludwiger was born in Beuthen, Silesia, in 1895. He had two brothers, both of whom were killed during World War II. Ludwiger was called to the Prussian Army on 17 (or 19) August 1914, shortly after the outbreak of World War I, as an officer candidate. He fought in World War I with the 11th Grenadier Regiment, after being commissioned a Leutnant on 30 July 1915. Ludwiger served in various platoons and companies as commander and participated in several well-known battles of the Great War in the Western Front – the battle of Champagne, the battle of Arras, the battle of Somme, the battle of Flandres and the battle of Maas – earning the Iron Cross 1st Class for his bravery. He was also wounded in action several times and was awarded the Wound Badge in Silver.

After the capitulation of the German Empire in 1918, he was retained in the Reichswehr. During the early 1920s, he took part in the suppression of the Silesian Uprisings. He was promoted to Oberleutnant in July 1925 and Hauptmann in 1930. He served in various infantry regiments, and as part of the military mobilization following Adolf Hitler's rise to power, he was named commander of the 3rd Battalion of the 28th Infantry Regiment in 1936, with the rank of Major.

== World War II ==
=== France and Soviet Union ===
On 1 March 1940, Ludwiger was appointed commander of the 83rd Infantry Regiment of the 28th Infantry Division, with which he took part in the Invasion of France. Following Operation Barbarossa, he was awarded the Knight's Cross of the Iron Cross on 15 July 1941, and was promoted to Oberst on 1 September 1941. Due to the heavy casualties his regiment (and the division as a whole) suffered while fighting in the Battle of Moscow, the 28th Infantry Division was moved to occupied France to refit as a Jäger division on 1 December. The 28th Jäger Division was sent back to the front in southern Ukraine, where it participated in the Battle of the Kerch Peninsula in the Crimea and in the Strait of Kerch. During his award ceremony, he met his future superior, Hubert Lanz, and his future subordinate Harald von Hirschfeld.

=== Yugoslavia ===
Ludwiger was posted as commander of the 704th Infantry Division in Yugoslavia on 20 February 1943. The division was later (1 April 1943) renamed to 104th Jäger Division and Ludwiger assumed his post on 3 March 1943, while within the next month, he was promoted to Generalmajor.

Ludwiger was quite active in the anti-Partisan operations. In particular, he was placed in command of a unit consisting mainly of the 724th Jäger Regiment and a Bulgarian regiment, designated Kampfgruppe von Ludwiger (Battle Group von Ludwiger). Aided by the Italian Taurinense Division, Kampfgruppe Ludwiger was tasked with the obliteration of armed guerrillas in the area of Montenegro, mainly Chetniks and Tito's communist partisans. This campaign was launched on 20 May under the codename Operation Schwarz. But, as partisans deliberately avoided open battles with the well-equipped German forces (at least in Ludwiger's sector), the overall action of the Kampfgruppe returned rather poor results. Subsequently, the unit was dissolved on 9 June and Ludwiger with his staff returned to Požarevac.

Of course, Ludwiger didn't quit his activities concerning the suppression of partisans. But with chances of extermination of the partisan forces themselves being slim, in the meanwhile Ludwiger launched a terror campaign against the civilian population. Specifically, he implemented the typical 50:1 reprisals ratio, which ordered the execution of 50 civilian hostages for every German killed by partisan activity. As a result, in two months' time, from 1 April to 1 June, Ludwiger's superior, supreme commander of Military District Serbia, General Paul Bader, was virtually flooded with Ludwiger's requests for reprisals, but he nevertheless authorized them. In total, 500 civilians were killed in reprisals for the murder of 8 German soldiers and 2 Serbian mayors from partisans, while numerous villages were looted and torched.

=== Greece ===
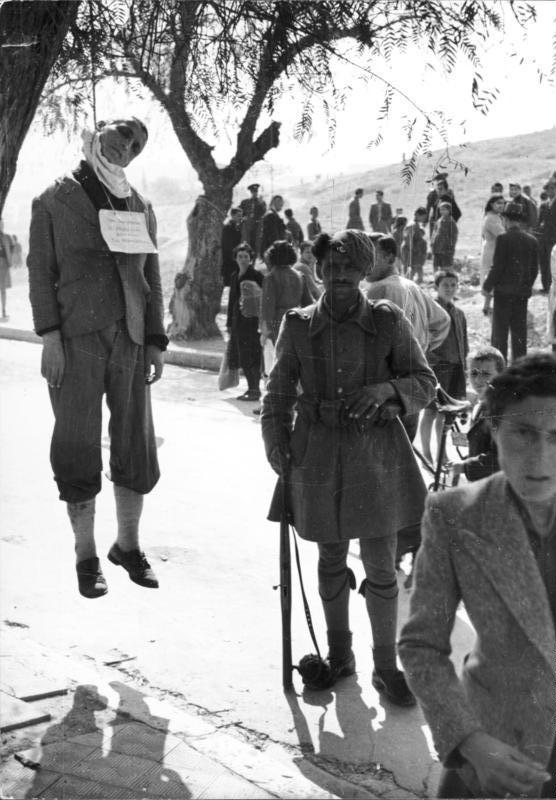
The body of a hanged man, guarded by a man of the collaborationist Security Battalions, in public view, Greece 1943

On the morning of July 10, 1943, a German military unit—consisting of a column of 120 officers and soldiers, 14 vehicles, and 3 motorcycles—set out from Agrinio to establish a presence in Thermo. The column was commanded by Captain Bettler. Resistance fighters laid an ambush near the village of Myrtia; in the ensuing battle, 117 Germans were killed, 2 were taken prisoner, and 1 managed to escape. Ludwiger, installing his headquarters in Agrinio, applied to carry out his usual reprisal tactics against civilians, but this time his request was rejected from the staff of Army Group "E", as the Germans initially tried to maintain good relations with the Greek population. Despite this, German forces razed a village near Nafpaktos and executed 12 "suspicious gangsters".

After the Allied invasion of Sicily, Italian forces signed an armistice with the Allied troops. The Germans were prepared for this possibility and launched Operation Achse to forcibly disarm Italian troops in southern France and the Balkans. The 1st Company of the 724th Battalion of Ludwiger's division was ordered to disarm the Italian garrison in Kefalonia along with the 1st Mountain Division, something that resulted in one of the largest executions of POWs to be committed during World War II: the massacre of the Acqui Division in September 1943.

Ludwiger was promoted to Generalleutnant on 1 January 1944. As of August 1944, Ludwiger's forces continued the reprisals against the Greek population, now aided by SS divisions. Ludwiger wrote in his report that

With the permanent destruction of the villages in all the areas they passed from, but mainly with the decisive burning of the communistic centre of Karpenisi, the partisans were deprived from numerous possible shelters.

Ludwiger and the surviving elements of his division, which had suffered heavy casualties in the Balkans, were captured towards the end of the war. His successor in command of 104th Jäger Division, Generalleutnant Friedrich Stephan was captured as well and was shot in Ljubljana along with three other generals without trial from Yugoslav partisans in early June.

== Trial and conviction ==
After being held in a POW camp, Ludwiger was put on trial before a Yugoslavian court-martial in Belgrade (during the 6th Process of the Yugoslav war crimes trials of German officials) between 27 March and 4 April 1947, along with several German officers, such as Generalmajor Hans Gravenstein and SS-Brigadeführer und Generalmajor der Waffen-SS Karl von Oberkamp, all of whom received the death penalty. Ludwiger was specifically indicted for

[...] Harassment, torture and murder of POWs and prisoners of the People's Liberation Army, for torching, looting, kidnapping of non-combatants to concentration camps and violent crimes against women and children.

Found guilty of the charges, he was sentenced to death on 1 April 1947. He was executed in a prison at Belgrade; The exact date varies according to the source - possibly on 3 or 5 May, and less plausibly on 25 April. (Note: In H. F. Meyer's Blutiges Edelweiß, citing the study Zur Geschichte der deutschen Kriegsgefangenen des Zweiten Weltkrieges. Die deutschen Kriegsgefangenen in Jugoslawien 1949-1953 by German historian Kurt W. Böhme, the date of the execution is 3 May, and by firing squad. According to Walther-Peer Fellgiebel (p. 57), Ludwiger was "hanged" on 5 May. Like other German officers executed in Yugoslavia after World War II, the exact place and way of execution is obscure.)

== Awards ==
- Knight's Cross of the Iron Cross
  - Knight's Cross of the Iron Cross on 15 July 1941 as Oberstleutnant and commander of Infanterie-Regiment 83
  - 163rd Oak Leaves on 23 December 1942 as Oberst and commander of Jäger-Regiment 83

== Sources ==
- Angolia, John R.; Roger, James Bender (1981). On the field of honor: a history of the Knight's Cross bearers (volume 2).
- Fellgiebel, Walther-Peer (2000) [1986]. Die Träger des Ritterkreuzes des Eisernen Kreuzes 1939–1945 — Die Inhaber der höchsten Auszeichnung des Zweiten Weltkrieges aller Wehrmachtteile [The Bearers of the Knight's Cross of the Iron Cross 1939–1945 — The Owners of the Highest Award of the Second World War of all Wehrmacht Branches] (in German). Friedberg, Germany: Podzun-Pallas. ISBN 978-3-7909-0284-6.
- Fellgiebel, Walther-Peer. "Elite of the Third Reich:The Recipients of the Knight's Cross of the Iron Cross 1939-1945: A Reference", Helion and Company Limited 2003
- Meyer, Hermann Frank (2009). Blutiges Edelweiß: Die 1. Gebirgs-division im zweiten Weltkrieg (vol. 1) (in Greek). Athens, Greece: Estia's Bookstore. ISBN 978-960-05-1423-0.
- Meyer, Hermann Frank (2009). Blutiges Edelweiß: Die 1. Gebirgs-division im zweiten Weltkrieg (vol. 2) (in Greek). Athens, Greece: Estia's Bookstore. ISBN 978-960-05-1425-4.
- Scherzer, Veit (2007). Die Ritterkreuzträger 1939–1945 Die Inhaber des Ritterkreuzes des Eisernen Kreuzes 1939 von Heer, Luftwaffe, Kriegsmarine, Waffen-SS, Volkssturm sowie mit Deutschland verbündeter Streitkräfte nach den Unterlagen des Bundesarchives [The Knight's Cross Bearers 1939–1945 The Holders of the Knight's Cross of the Iron Cross 1939 by Army, Air Force, Navy, Waffen-SS, Volkssturm and Allied Forces with Germany According to the Documents of the Federal Archives] (in German). Jena, Germany: Scherzers Militaer-Verlag. ISBN 978-3-938845-17-2.
- Thomas, Franz (1998). Die Eichenlaubträger 1939–1945 Band 2: L–Z [The Oak Leaves Bearers 1939–1945 Volume 2: L–Z] (in German). Osnabrück, Germany: Biblio-Verlag. ISBN 978-3-7648-2300-9.

Military offices
Preceded by Oberst Wilhelm von Altrock	Commander of 83. Infanterie-Regiment; 1 March 1940 – 30 June 1942	Succeeded by none converted to 83. Jäger-Regiment
Preceded by none	Commander of 83. Jäger-Regiment; 1 July 1942 – 4 January 1943	Succeeded by Oberst Bernhard Ueberschär
Preceded by Generalleutnant Hans Juppe	Commander of 704. Infanterie Division; 20 February 1943 – 1 April 1943	Succeeded by none converted to 104. Jäger Division
Preceded by none	Commander of 104. Jäger Division; 1 April 1943 – May 1943	Succeeded by Oberst Ludwig Steyrer
Preceded by none	Commander of Kampfgruppe von Ludwiger; 20 May 1943 – 9 June 1943	Succeeded by disbanded
Preceded by Oberst Ludwig Steyrer	Commander of 104. Jäger Division; May 1943 – 29 April 1945	Succeeded by Generalleutnant Friedrich Stephan
Preceded by General der Gebirgstruppe Hubert Lanz	Deputy Commander of XXII. Gebirgs-Armeekorps; 11 January 1944 – 24 February 1944	Succeeded by General der Gebirgstruppe Hubert Lanz
Preceded by General der Gebirgstruppe Hubert Lanz	Deputy Commander of XXII. Gebirgs-Armeekorps; 7 March 1944 – 5 May 1944	Succeeded by General der Gebirgstruppe Hubert Lanz
Preceded by General der Infanterie Ernst von Leyser	Commander of XXI. Gebirgs-Armeekorps; 29 April 1945 – 8 May 1945	Succeeded by disbanded
