= Captain Corelli's Mandolin (film) =

2001 film by John Madden

- Theatrical release poster
- Directed by: John Madden
- Screenplay by: Shawn Slovo
- Based on: Captain Corelli's Mandolin by Louis de Bernières
- Produced by: Tim Bevan; Eric Fellner; Mark Huffam; Kevin Loader
- Starring: Nicolas Cage; Penélope Cruz; John Hurt; Christian Bale; David Morrissey; Irene Papas
- Cinematography: John Toll
- Edited by: Mick Audsley
- Music by: Stephen Warbeck
- Production companies: StudioCanal; Working Title Films
- Distributed by: United Kingdom, Ireland, Australia, New Zealand and Japan; Miramax Films (through Buena Vista International); France; BAC Films; International; Universal Pictures (though United International Pictures)
- Release dates: 4 May 2001 (UK); 20 June 2001 (France); 17 August 2001 (US)
- Running time: 129 minutes
- Countries: France; United Kingdom; United States
- Languages: English; Greek; German; Italian
- Budget: $57 million
- Box office: $62.1 million

Captain Corelli's Mandolin is a 2001 war film directed by John Madden. It is based on the 1994 novel Captain Corelli's Mandolin by Louis de Bernières. The film pays homage to the thousands of Italian soldiers executed at the Massacre of the Acqui Division by German forces in Cephalonia in September 1943, and to the people of Cephalonia who were killed in the 1953 Ionian earthquake. The novel's protagonists are portrayed by actors Nicolas Cage and Penélope Cruz.

== Plot ==
Greece's Ionian Islands are occupied by the Italian Army when it brings a large garrison along with a few Germans to the tranquil island of Cephalonia, whose inhabitants surrender immediately. Captain Antonio Corelli, an officer of the Italian 33rd Acqui Infantry Division, has a jovial personality and a passion for the mandolin and trains his battery of men (who have never fired a shot) to choral sing. Initially, he alienates a number of villagers, including Pelagia, the daughter of the village doctor. She is an educated and strong-willed woman. At first offended by the Italian soldier's behaviour, she slowly warms to Corelli's charm, and mandolin playing, as they are forced to share her father's home after the doctor agrees to put him up in exchange for medical supplies.

When Pelagia's fiancé, Mandras, a local fisherman, heads off to war on the mainland, the friendship between Antonio and Pelagia grows. Her beauty and intelligence have captured Corelli's heart, and his fondness for the village's vibrant community has caused him to question his reasons for fighting. Corelli and his battery of musical troops become a part of the villagers' lives, but the moment is fleeting. As the war draws closer, Antonio and Pelagia are forced to choose between their allegiances and love for one another.

The Italian government surrenders to the Allies, and the Italian troops happily prepare to return home. However, their erstwhile allies, the Germans, insist on disarming them, intemperately and violently. The Greeks are also exposed to the brutality of the incoming Germans and arrange with the Italians to use their arms in a brief but futile resistance. For this, the German High Command has thousands of Italian troops shot as traitors. Corelli survives when one of his soldiers shields him from the fusillade of the German executioners' bullets with his body and falls dead on top of him. Mandras finds Corelli, still alive among the pile of massacred soldiers and takes him to Pelagia and the doctor for treatment and recovery, and then to a boat to escape the island. As a result of Pelagia's questioning, Mandras admits that he rescued Corelli from the heap of dead soldiers because he wanted to rekindle their love. But it does no good and tears the couple part. Earlier, on one of Mandras's return visits to Cephallonia, he admits to Pelagia that he never replied to her many love letters because he is illiterate.

In 1947, Pelagia receives a parcel from Italy containing a record of the tune Corelli wrote for her, but no note. An earthquake destroys much of the village including the doctor's house, but island life continues, and, soon after, Corelli returns to Pelagia.

== Cast ==
- Nicolas Cage as Captain Antonio Corelli
- Penélope Cruz as Pelagia
- John Hurt as Dr. Yiannis
- Christian Bale as Mandras
- David Morrissey as Captain Günther Weber
- Irene Papas as Drosoula
- Piero Maggio as Carlo
- Gerasimos Skiadaressis as Mr. Stamatis
- Aspasia Kralli as Mrs. Stamatis
- Michael Yannatos as Kokolios
- Dimitris Kaberidis as Father Arsenios
- Pietro Sarubbi as Velisarios, The Strongman
- Viki Maragaki as Eleni, Pelagia's friend
- Joanna-Daria Adraktas as Young Lemoni
- Ira Tavlaridis as Older Lemoni
- Katerina Didaskalou as Lemoni's mother
- Emilios Chilakis as Dimitris
- Panagis Polichronatos as Partisan
- Patrick Malahide as Colonel Johannes Barge
- George Kotanidis as Mayor
- Alberto the mischievous village cat, played by himself

== Production ==
In autumn 1994, producer Kevin Loader bought a copy of Captain Corelli's Mandolin by Louis de Bernières, and was immediately interested in adapting it to film. The British Loader and director Roger Michell did not think a $25 million production would be financed in the United Kingdom, and after sending the script to the US believed that Hollywood studios and agencies did not understand the novel. According to Loader, these groups were "put off by large sections of the novel concerning Mussolini, a cat and chapters called L'Omosessuale." The two then decided to go to Working Title Films on the basis that it was a European production company, a proposition accepted by executive Tim Bevan.

As Cage was not a musician, he learned how to play a mandolin for the role. In every scene in which Corelli plays the instrument, Cage was actually playing the mandolin. According to de Bernières, Cage was in a bad mood throughout filming due to going through a divorce with his then-wife Patricia Arquette, and would fly back to California every week.

== Reception ==
=== Box office ===
The film grossed $13.8 million in the United Kingdom. The film opened at number six at the US box office, taking in $7,209,345 in its opening weekend and went on to gross $25,543,895 in the United States and Canada. It grossed an additional $22.8 million internationally for a total of $62,112,895 worldwide against a cost of $57 million.

=== Critical response ===
On Rotten Tomatoes, the film has an approval rating of 28% based on reviews from 118 critics, with an average rating of 4.5/10. The website's critical consensus reads: "The cinematography is gorgeous, but the movie plays it fast and loose with history and the novel it was adapted from. Mostly, the movie fails because the romance between the leads strains credulity and the story is largely uninvolving." On Metacritic, the film has a weighted average score of 36 out of 100, based on reviews from 33 critics, indicating "generally unfavorable" reviews.

Derek Elley of Variety praised the beautiful on-location shoot, but was critical of the film and wrote that it "Strikes too many false notes on the dramatic side to add up to a satisfying emotional experience." Roger Ebert of the Chicago Sun-Times gave the film 2 out of 4, and suggested the film might have worked better with subtitles, pointing out the absurdity of one scene "where something is said in English pronounced with one accent, and a character asks, What did he say? and he is told -- in English pronounced with another accent."
