= 104th Jäger Division =

704th Infantry Division 104th Jäger Division
- German: 704. Infanterie-Division; German: 104. Jäger-Division
- Divisional insignia
- Active: 1941 – 1945
- Country: Nazi Germany
- Allegiance: Adolf Hitler
- Branch: Infantry
- Size: Division
- Engagements: World War II

104th Jäger Division was an infantry division of the Germany Army in World War II. It was formed in April 1943, by the redesignation of the 704th Infantry Division, which was itself formed in April 1941. The division served in German-occupied Yugoslavia in May 1941 where it took part in anti-partisan and security operations in the Independent State of Croatia. In April 1943, it was reorganized and redesignated the 104th Jäger Division and took part in the Battle of the Sutjeska in June 1943. Following the Italian surrender, elements from the division took part in the murder of thousands of Italians from the 33 Infantry Division Acqui in September 1943, on the Greek island of Cefalonia in one of the largest-scale German atrocities to be committed by German Army troops instead of the Waffen SS.

The division surrendered to the Yugoslav Army at Celje in Slovenia in May 1945. Many of the division's survivors, including the commander General Friedrich Stephan, were executed by the Yugoslavs after they had surrendered.

== Background ==
The main purpose of the German jäger divisions was to fight in adverse terrain where smaller, coordinated formations were more facilely combat capable than the brute force offered by the standard infantry divisions. The jäger divisions were more heavily equipped than the mountain divisions, but not as well armed as larger infantry formations. In the early stages of the war, they were the interface divisions fighting in rough terrain and foothills as well as urban areas, between the mountains and the plains. The jägers (it means hunters in German), relied on a high degree of training and slightly superior communications, as well as their not inconsiderable artillery support. In the middle stages of the war, as the standard infantry divisions were downsized, the Jäger structure of divisions, with two infantry regiments, became the standard table of organization.

== Commanders ==
- Generalmajor Heinrich Borowski (22 April 1941 – 15 August 1942)
- Generalleutnant Hans Juppe (15 August 1942 – 20 February 1943)
- Generalleutnant Hartwig von Ludwiger (20 February – 30 April 1943)
- Oberst Ludwig Steyrer (May 1943)
- General der Infanterie Hartwig von Ludwiger (May 1943 – 29 April 1945)
- Generalleutnant Friedrich Stephan (29 April – 8 May 1945)

== Area of operations ==
- Germany (April 1941 – May 1941)
- Yugoslavia (May 1941 – June 1943)
- Greece (June 1943 – September 1944)
- Yugoslavia (September 1944 – May 1945)

== Order of battle ==
- Jäger Regiment 724
- Jäger Regiment 734
- Reconnaissance Battalion 104
- Artillery Regiment 654
- Pionier Battalion 104
- Panzerjäger Battalion 104
- Signals Battalion 104
- Reserve Battalion 104
- Versorgungseinheiten 104
