= Harald von Hirschfeld =

German military officer

- Born: 11 July 1912; Weimar, German Empire
- Died: 18 January 1945 (aged 32); Dukla Pass, Germany (modern-day Prešov, Slovakia)
- Military career
- Allegiance: Nazi Germany
- Branch: Heer
- Service years: 1935–1945
- Rank: Generalleutnant (posthumously)
- Commands: 78. Volksgrenadier-Division
- Conflicts: Annexation of Austria; Annexation of the Sudetenland: World War II; Eastern Front; Invasion of Poland; Operation Barbarossa; Battle of Uman; Battle of Kiev; Battle of Rostov; Second Battle of Kharkov; Battle of the Caucasus; Battle of Dukla Pass (DOW); Mediterranean Theater; Cephalonia Massacre
- Awards: Knight's Cross of the Iron Cross with Oak Leaves

Harald von Hirschfeld (10 July 1912 – 18 January 1945) was a general in the Wehrmacht of Nazi Germany who commanded the 78. Volksgrenadier-Division during World War II. He was a recipient of the Knight's Cross of the Iron Cross with Oak Leaves.

Hirschfeld, the son of a Mecklenburg merchant, was largely educated and trained abroad, in South America, Spain, London, and Paris and was fluent in Italian and Spanish. He joined the Wehrmacht in 1935 and served most of his career in the 1st Mountain Division (1. Gebirgs-Division): in 1938 he was the Adjutant of the 2nd battalion; in August 1940, he took command of the 7th company; in August 1942 he led the 2nd company and in October 1943 he served as the commander of the 98th Mountain Regiment.

In September 1943, as a colonel in the 1st Mountain Division, he played a major role in the massacre of the Acqui Division, the murder of 5,155 Italian prisoners of war of the 33 Mountain Infantry Division Acqui in Cephalonia.

On 15 January 1945, he was promoted to Generalmajor. On that day he was officially put in command of the 78th Sturm Division, which he had unofficially led since 26 September 1944. He was the Wehrmacht's youngest general officer. On 18 January 1945, shortly after the start of the major Soviet winter offensive, Hirschfeld was severely wounded during a Soviet low-level aerial attack near the Dukla Pass and died the same day en route to the field hospital. He was posthumously promoted to lieutenant general on 10 February 1945. Hirschfeld was married to Sylvina von Dönhoff, who later married the former fighter pilot Adolf Galland.

== Awards and decorations ==
- Anschluss Medal (8 November 1938)
- Iron Cross (1939) 2nd Class (1 November 1939) & 1st Class (28 June 1941)
- Wound Badge (1939) Black (23 July 1941), Silver (23 September 1941) & Gold (2 October 1941)
- Infantry Assault Badge (25 July 1941)
- Order of the Crown (Romania) with Swords on Ribbon 5th Class (1 November 1941)
- Eastern Front Medal (1 August 1942)
- Knight's Cross of the Iron Cross with Oak Leaves
  - Knight's Cross on 15 November 1941 as Oberleutnant and chief of the 7./Gebirgsjäger-Regiment 98
  - Oak Leaves on 23 December 1942 as Hauptmann and leader of the 11./Gebirgsjäger-Regiment 98

Military offices
Preceded by Generalmajor Alois Weber	Commander of 78. Volksgrenadier-Division; 1 December 1944 – 18 January 1945	Succeeded by Generalmajor Wilhelm Nagel
