= Friedrich Stephan (soldier) =

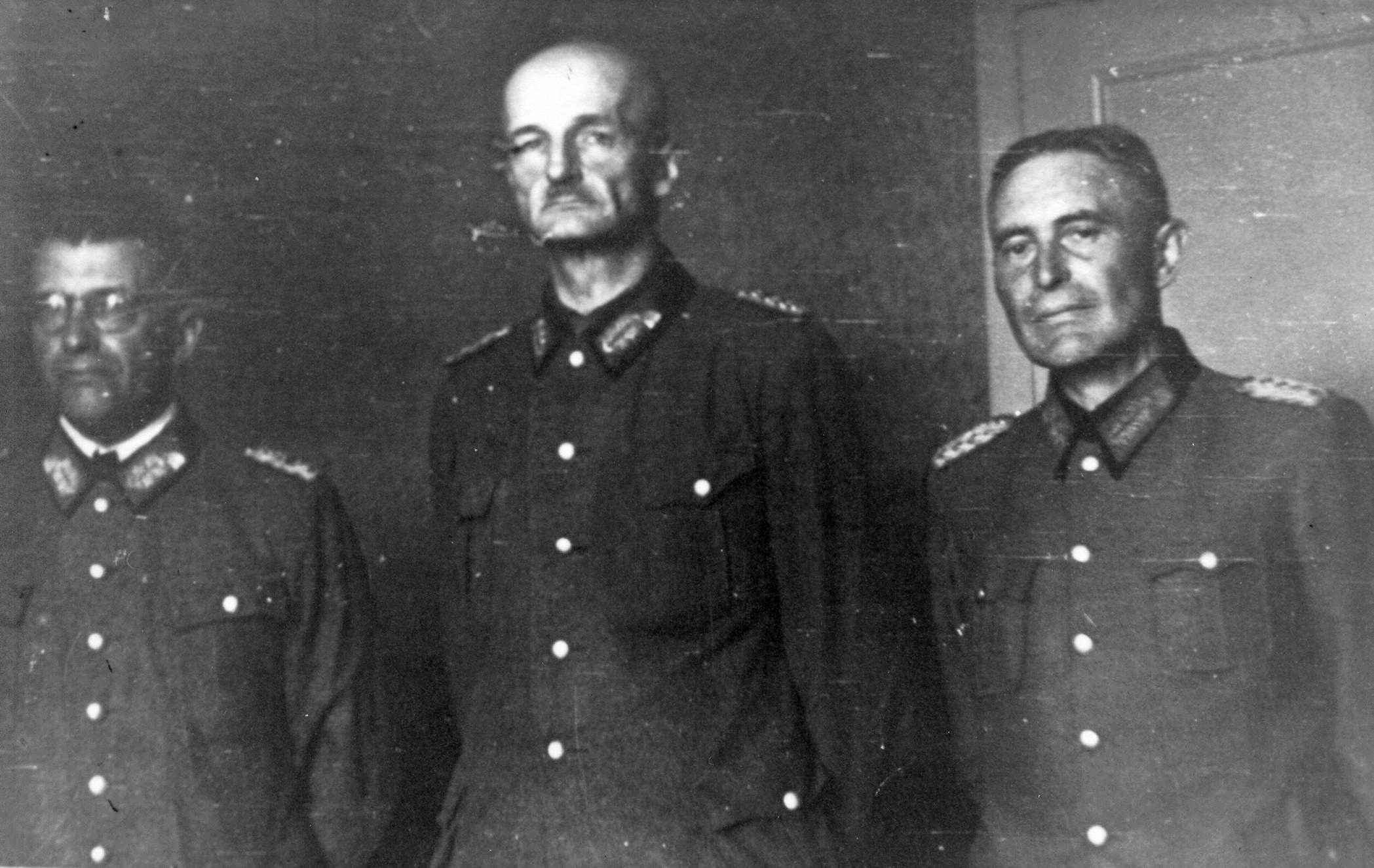
(left to right) Friedrich Stephan, Werner von Erdmannsdorff, and Heinz Kattner.

Friedrich Stephan (Danzig, 26 January 1892 – Ljubljana, 5 June 1945) was a Generalleutnant in the Wehrmacht of Nazi Germany during World War II.

== Biography ==
His mother was from the family Mengele. He served in the first world war with his uncle Stephan Mengele. He commanded the 267th Infantry Division (January 1942 – June 1943) on the Eastern Front.

Between September 1944 and February 1945 he was Kampfkommandant of the Belgrade area and led anti-partisan operations. On 29 April 1945, he became the last commander of the 104th Jäger Division. He was taken prisoner by the Yugoslav Partisans and shot on 5 June 1945 in Ljubljana, together with generals Gustav Fehn (XV Mountain Corps), Werner von Erdmannsdorff (LXXXXI Corps) and Heinz Kattner (Feldkommandant of Sarajevo).

== Sources ==
- Lexikon-der-wehrmacht

Military offices
Preceded by Generalmajor Karl Fischer	Commander of 267th Infantry Division; 24 January 1942 – 8 June 1943	Succeeded by Generalleutnant Otto Drescher
Preceded by Generalleutnant Hartwig von Ludwiger	Commander of 104th Jäger Division; 29 April – 8 May 1945	Succeeded by None
