= Massacre of the Acqui Division =

World War II massacre

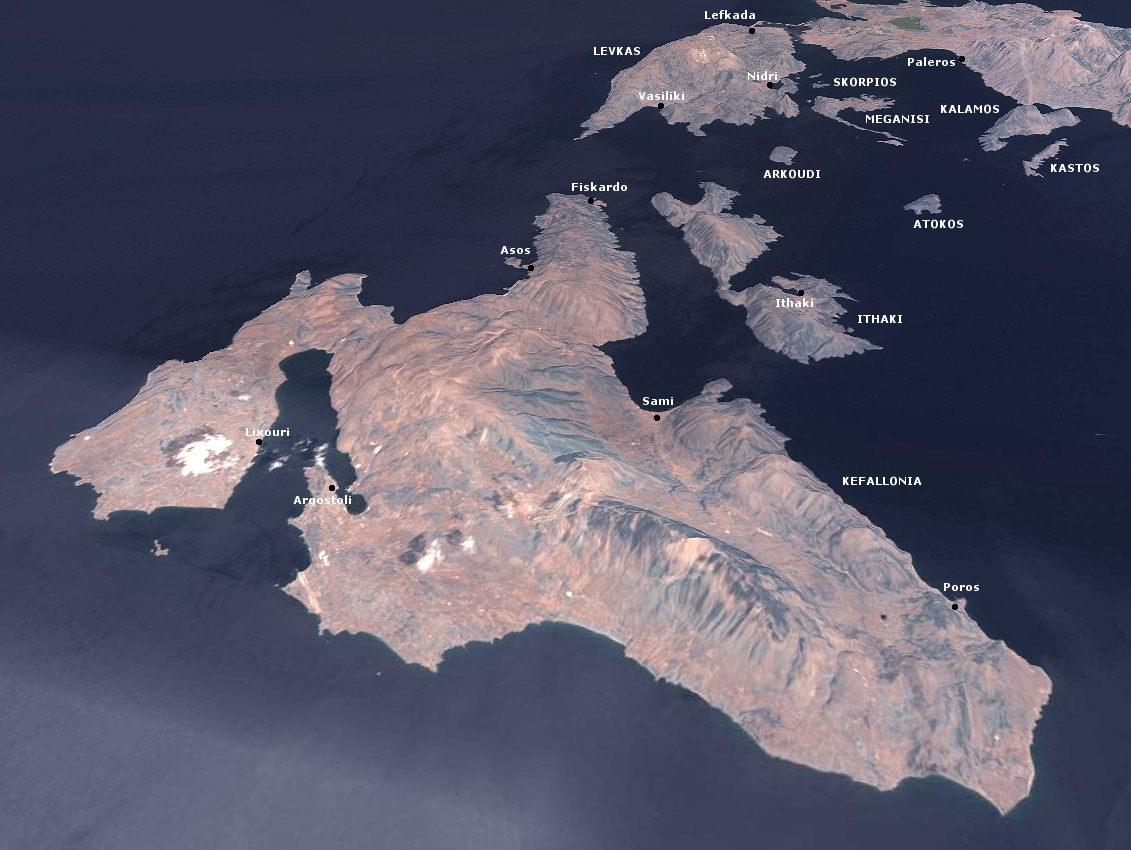
- The island of Cephalonia
- Location: 38.25°N 20.59°E; Cephalonia, Ionian Islands, Kingdom of Greece
- Date: 21–26 September 1943
- Attack type: Mass murder; Summary execution
- Deaths: 6,470 killed: 1,315 killed in action against German forces (300 German soldiers were killed in action prior to the surrender of the Italians); 5,155 prisoners of war executed (including General Antonio Gandin); Approximately another 3,000 POWs drowned after their transport ships were sunk by Allied aircraft and sea mines, amounting to 9,500 Italian soldiers being killed, of the 12,000 strong division
- Victim: (Kingdom of Italy) Royal Italian Army: 33rd Infantry Division "Acqui"
- Perpetrators: (Nazi Germany) German Army: 1st Mountain Division; 104th Jäger Division; Gen. Hubert Lanz; Lt. Col. Johannes Barge; Maj. Harald von Hirschfeld

The Massacre of the Acqui Division, also known as the Cephalonia massacre, was a war crime by German soldiers against POWs of the Italian 33rd Infantry Division "Acqui" on the island of Cephalonia, Greece, in September 1943, following the Armistice of Cassibile during the Second World War. About 5,000 soldiers were executed, and around 3,000 more drowned.

Following the decision of the Italian government to negotiate a surrender to the Allies in 1943, the German Army tried to disarm the Italians during Operation Achse. On 13 September the Italians of the Acqui resisted, and fought the Germans on the island of Cephalonia. By 22 September the last of the Italian resistance surrendered after running out of ammunition. A total of 1,315 Italians were killed in the battle, 5,155 were executed by 26 September, and 3,000 drowned when the German ships taking the survivors to concentration camps were sunk by the Allies. It was one of the largest prisoner of war massacres of the war, along with the Katyn massacre carried out by the Soviet Union, and it was one of many atrocities committed by the 1st Mountain Division (German: 1. Gebirgs-Division).

== History ==
=== Background ===
General Antonio Gandin, commander of the Acqui Division

After the fall of Greece in April and May 1941, the country had been divided in occupation zones, with the Italians getting the bulk of the mainland and most islands. The Acqui Division had been the Italian garrison of Cephalonia since May 1943, and consisted of 11,500 soldiers and 525 officers. It was composed of two infantry regiments (the 17th and the 317th), the 33rd artillery regiment, the 27th Blackshirt Legion with the XIX Blackshirt Battalion and support units. Furthermore, its 18th Regiment was detached to garrison duties in Corfu. The Acqui also had naval coastal batteries, torpedo boats and two aircraft. From 18 June 1943, it was commanded by the 52-year-old General Antonio Gandin, a decorated veteran of the Russian Front where he earned the German Iron Cross.

The Germans decided to reinforce their presence throughout the Balkans, following Allied successes and the possibility that Italy might seek accommodation with the Allies. On 5–6 July Lt Colonel Johannes Barge arrived with 2,000 men of the 966th Fortress Grenadier Regiment, including Fortress-Battalions 810 and 909 and a battery of self-propelled guns and nine tanks.

After Italy's armistice with the Allies in September 1943, General Gandin found himself in a dilemma: one option was surrendering to the Germans – who were already prepared for the eventuality and had begun disarming Italian garrisons elsewhere – or trying to resist. Initially, Gandin requested instructions from his superiors and began negotiations with Barge.

On 8 September 1943, the day the armistice was made public, General Carlo Vecchiarelli, commander of the 170,000-strong Italian army occupying Greece, telegrammed Gandin his order, essentially a copy of General Ambrosio's promemoria 2 from Headquarters. Vecchiarelli's order instructed that if the Germans did not attack the Italians, the Italians should not attack the Germans. Ambrosio's order stated that the Italians should not "make common cause" with the Greek partisans or even the Allies, should they arrive in Cephalonia.

In the case of a German attack, Vecchiarelli's order was not very specific because it was based on General Pietro Badoglio's directive which stated that the Italians should respond with "maximum decision" to any threat from any side. The order implied that the Italians should defend themselves but did not explicitly state so. At 22:30 of the same day Gandin received an order directly from General Ambrosio to send most of his naval and merchant vessels to Brindisi immediately, as demanded by the terms of the armistice. Gandin complied, thus losing a possible means of escape.

To make matters even more complicated Badoglio had agreed, after the overthrow of Mussolini, to the unification of the two armies under German command, in order to appease the Germans. Therefore, technically, both Vecchiarelli and Gandin were under German command, even though Italy had implemented an armistice agreement with the Allies. That gave the Germans a sense of justification in treating any Italians disobeying their orders as mutineers or francs-tireurs, which, at that time, the laws of war considered unlawful combatants subject to execution on capture.

At 9:00 hours on 9 September, Barge met with Gandin and misled him by stating that he had received no orders from the German command. The two men liked each other and they had things in common as Gandin was pro-German and liked Goethe. Indeed, Gandin's pro-German attitude was the reason he had been sent by General Ambrosio to command the Acqui Division: fearing he might side with the Germans against the evolving plot to depose Mussolini, Ambrosio wanted Gandin out of Italy. Both men ended their meeting on good terms, agreeing to wait for orders and also that the situation should be resolved peacefully.

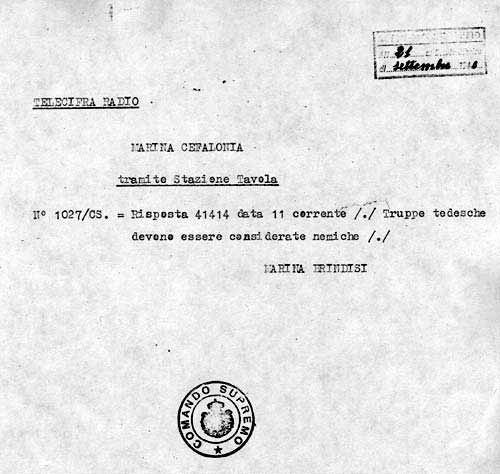
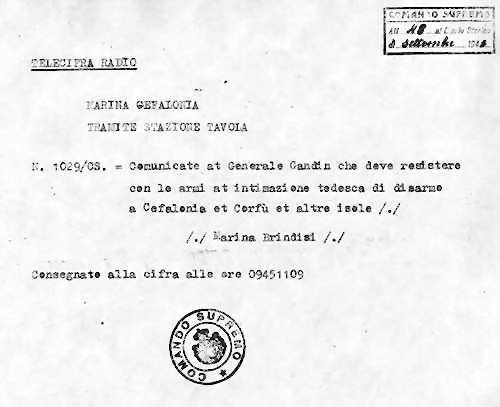
The two orders (1027/CS and 1029/CS) received by Gandin from the Italian Comando Supremo, ordering him to resist the German forces.

On 11 September, the Italian High Command sent two explicit instructions to Gandin, to the effect that "German troops have to be viewed as hostile" and that "disarmament attempts by German forces must be resisted with weapons". That same day Barge handed Gandin an ultimatum, demanding a decision given the following three options:

1. Continue fighting on the German side
2. Fight against the Germans
3. Hand over arms peacefully

Gandin brought Barge's ultimatum to his senior officers and the seven chaplains of the Acqui for discussion. Six of the chaplains and all of his senior officers advised him to comply with the German demands while one of the chaplains suggested immediate surrender. However, Gandin could not agree to join the Germans because that would be against the King's orders as relayed by Badoglio. He also did not want to fight them because, as he said, "they had fought with us and for us, side by side". On the other hand, surrendering the weapons would violate the spirit of the armistice. Despite the orders from the Italian GHQ, Gandin chose to continue negotiating with Barge.

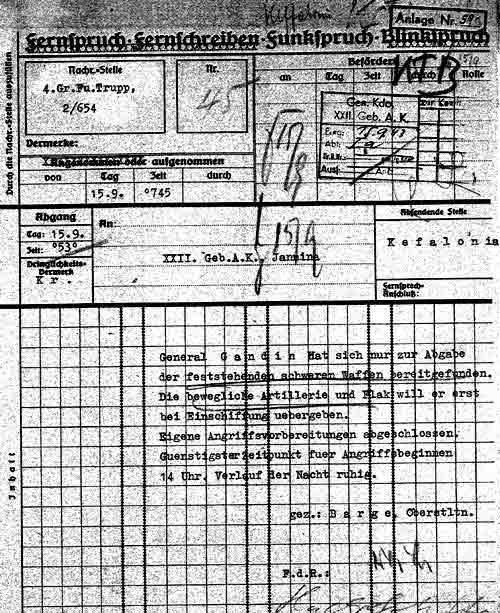
Barge's telegram to his superiors, reporting Gandin's decision to hand over only heavy weaponry, and the German troops' readiness to attack

Gandin finally agreed to withdraw his soldiers from their strategic location on Mount Kardakata, the island's "nerve centre", in return for a German promise not to bring reinforcements from the Greek mainland and on 12 September, he informed Barge that he was prepared to surrender the Acqui's weapons, as Lt Colonel Barge reported to his superiors in the XXII Mountain Corps. However, Gandin was under pressure not to come to an agreement with the Germans from his junior officers who were threatening mutiny. The Acqui's detached regiment on Corfu, not commanded by Gandin, also informed him at around midnight 12–13 September, by radio communication, that they had rejected an agreement with the Germans. Gandin also heard from credible sources that soldiers who had surrendered were being deported and not repatriated.

On 13 September, a German convoy of five ships approached the island's capital, Argostoli. Italian artillery officers, on their own initiative, ordered the remaining batteries to open fire, sinking two German landing craft and killing five Germans.

Under these circumstances, that same night, Gandin presented his troops with a poll, essentially containing the three options presented to him by Barge:

1. Join the Germans
2. Surrender and be repatriated
3. Resist the German forces

The response from the Italian troops was in favour of the third option by a large majority but there is no available information as to the exact size of the majority, and therefore on 14 September Gandin reneged on the agreement, refusing to surrender anything but the division's heavy artillery and telling the Germans to leave the island, demanding a reply by 9:00 the next day.

=== Battle with the Germans ===
As the negotiations stalled, the Germans prepared to resolve the crisis by force and presented the Italians with an ultimatum which expired at 14:00 on 15 September.

On the morning of 15 September, the German Luftwaffe began bombarding the Italian positions with Stuka dive-bombers. On the ground, the Italians initially enjoyed superiority, and took about 400 Germans prisoner. On 17 September however, the Germans landed the "Battle Group Hirschfeld", composed of the III./98 and the 54th Mountain Battalions of the German Army's elite 1st Mountain Division, together with I./724 Battalion of the 104th Jäger Division, under the command of Major Harald von Hirschfeld. The 98th Gebirgsjäger Regiment, in particular, had been involved in several atrocities against civilians in Epirus in the months preceding the Acqui massacre.

At the same time, the Germans started dropping propaganda leaflets calling upon the Italians to surrender. The leaflets stated:

"Italian comrades, soldiers and officers, why fight against the Germans? You have been betrayed by your leaders!... LAY DOWN YOUR ARMS!! THE ROAD BACK TO YOUR HOMELAND WILL BE OPENED UP FOR YOU BY YOUR GERMAN COMRADES".

Gandin repeatedly requested help from the Ministry of War in Brindisi, but he did not get any reply. He even went so far as sending a Red Cross emissary to the Ministry, but the mission broke down off the coast of Apulia and when it arrived three days later at the Italian High Command in Brindisi, it was already too late. In addition, 300 planes loyal to Badoglio were located at Lecce, near the southernmost point of Italy, well within range of Cephalonia, and were ready to intervene. But the Allies would not let them go because they feared they could have defected to the German side. Furthermore, two Italian torpedo boats, already on their way to Cephalonia, were ordered back to port by the Allies for the same reasons.

Despite help for the Italians from the local population, including the island's small ELAS partisan detachments, the Germans enjoyed complete air superiority and their troops had extensive combat experience, in contrast with the conscripts of Acqui, who were no match for the Germans. In addition, Gandin had withdrawn the Acqui from the elevated position on Mount Kardakata and that gave the Germans an additional strategic advantage. After several days of fighting, at 11:00 on 22 September, following Gandin's orders, the last Italians surrendered, having run out of ammunition and having lost 1,315 men. According to German sources, the losses were 300 Germans and 1,200 Italians. 15 Greek partisans were also killed fighting alongside the Acqui.

=== Massacre ===
Major Harald von Hirschfeld, commander of the Gebirgsjäger troops on Cephalonia

The massacre started on 21 September, and lasted for one week. After the Italian surrender, Hitler had issued an order allowing the Germans to summarily execute any Italian officer who resisted "for treason", and on 18 September, the German High Command issued an order stating that "because of the perfidious and treacherous behaviour [of the Italians] on Cephalonia, no prisoners are to be taken." The Gebirgsjäger soldiers began executing their Italian prisoners in groups of four to ten. The Germans first killed the surrendering Italians, where they stood, using machine-guns. When a group of Bavarian soldiers objected to this practice they were threatened with summary execution themselves. After this stage was over, the Germans marched the remaining soldiers to the San Teodoro town hall and had the prisoners executed by eight member detachments. General Gandin and 137 of his senior officers were summarily court-martialled on 24 September and executed, their bodies discarded at sea. The divisional infantry commander, General Luigi Gherzi, had already been executed on 22 September, immediately after his capture, while the fighting was still ongoing.

Padre Romualdo Formato, one of the seven chaplains of the Acqui Division

Romualdo Formato, one of Acqui's seven chaplains and one of the few survivors, wrote that during the massacre, the Italian officers started to cry, pray and sing. Many were shouting the names of their mothers, wives and children. According to Formato's account, three officers hugged and stated that they were comrades while alive and now in death they would go together to paradise, while others were digging through the grass as if trying to escape. In one place, Formato recalled, "the Germans went around loudly offering medical help to those wounded. When about 20 men crawled forward, a machine-gun salvo finished them off." Officers gave Formato their belongings to take with him and give to their families back in Italy. The Germans, however, confiscated the items and Formato could no longer account for the exact number of the officers killed.

The executions of the Italian officers were continuing when a German officer came and reprieved Italians who could prove they were from South Tyrol as that region had been annexed by Hitler as a German province after 8 September. Seeing an opportunity, Formato begged the officer to stop the killings and save the few officers remaining. The German officer responded and told Formato that he would consult with his commanding officer. When the officer returned, after half an hour, he informed Formato that the killings of the officers would stop. The number of Italian surviving officers, including Formato, totaled 37. After the reprieve the Germans congratulated the remaining Italians and offered them cigarettes. The situation remained unstable, however. Following the reprieve, the Germans forced twenty Italian sailors to load the bodies of the dead officers on rafts and take them out to sea. The Germans then blew up the rafts with the Italian sailors on board.

Alfred Richter, an Austrian and one of the participants in the massacre, recounted how a soldier who sang arias for the Germans in the local taverns was forced to sing while his comrades were being executed. The singing soldier's fate remains unknown. Richter stated that he and his regiment comrades felt "a delirium of omnipotence" during the events. Most of the soldiers of the German regiment were Austrians.

According to Richter the Italian soldiers were killed after surrendering to the soldiers of the 98th Regiment. He described that the bodies were then thrown into heaps, all shot in the head. Soldiers of the 98th Regiment started removing the boots from the corpses for their own use. Richter mentioned that groups of Italians were taken into quarries and walled gardens near the village of Frangata and executed by machine gun fire. The killing lasted for two hours, during which time the sound of the shooting and the screams of the victims could be heard inside the homes of the village.

The bodies of the ca. 5,000 men who were executed were disposed of in a variety of ways. Bodies were cremated in massive wood pyres, which made the air of the island thick with the smell of burning flesh, or moved to ships where they were buried at sea. Others, according to Amos Pampaloni, one of the survivors, were executed in full sight of the Greek population in Argostoli harbour on 23 September 1943 and their bodies were left to rot where they fell, while in smaller streets corpses were decomposing and the stench was insufferable to the point that he could not remain there long enough to take a picture of the carnage. Bodies were thrown into the sea, with rocks tied around them. In addition, the Germans had refused to allow the Acqui soldiers to bury their dead. A chaplain set out to find bodies, discovering bones scattered all over.

The few soldiers who were saved were assisted by locals and the ELAS organisation. One of the survivors was taken heavily wounded to a Cephalonian lady's home by a taxi driver and survived the war to live in Lake Como. An additional three thousand of the survivors in German custody drowned, when the ships Sinfra, Mario Roselli and Ardena, transporting them to concentration camps, were sunk by Allied air raids and sea mines in the Adriatic. These losses and similar ones from the Italian Dodecanese garrisons were also the result of German policy, as Hitler had instructed the local German commanders to forgo "all safety precautions" during the transport of prisoners, "regardless of losses". In a book review published by Corriere della Sera, other estimates of the Italian soldiers massacred at Cephalonia range between 1,650–3,800.

=== Aftermath ===
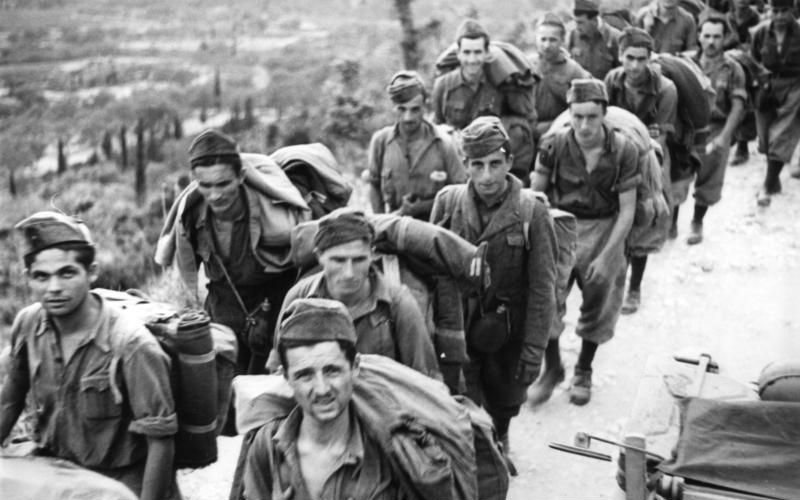
Italian soldiers taken prisoner by the Germans in Corfu, September 1943

The events in Cephalonia were repeated, to a lesser extent, elsewhere. In Corfu, the 8,000-strong Italian garrison comprised elements of three divisions, including the Acqui's 18th Regiment. On 24 September, the Germans landed a force on the island (characteristically codenamed "Operation Treason"), and by the next day they were able to induce the Italians to capitulate.

All 280 Italian officers on the island were executed during the next two days on the orders of General Lanz, in accordance with Hitler's directives. The bodies were loaded onto a ship and disposed of in the sea. Similar executions of officers also occurred in the aftermath of the Battle of Kos, where between 96 and 103 Italian officers were shot along with their commander.

In October 1943, after Mussolini had been freed and established his new Fascist Republic in Northern Italy, the Germans gave the remaining Italian prisoners three choices:

1. Continue fighting on the German side
2. Forced labour on the island
3. Concentration camps in Germany

Most Italians opted for the second choice.

In January 1944, a chaplain's account reached Benito Mussolini after Aurelio Garobbio, a Swiss Fascist from the Italian-speaking Canton of Ticino, informed him about the events. Mussolini became incensed that the Germans would do such a thing, although he considered the Acqui division's officers, more so than its soldiers, traitors. Nevertheless, in one of his exchanges with Garobbio, after Garobbio complained that the Germans showed no mercy, he said: "But our men defended themselves, you know. They hit several German landing craft sinking them. They fought how Italians know how to fight".

== Prosecution ==
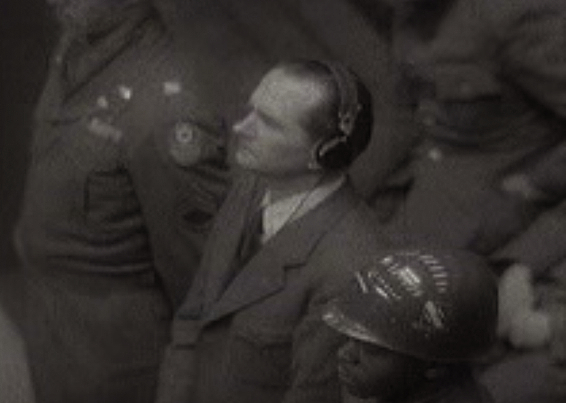
General Lanz, commander of the XXII Mountain Corps, at the Nuremberg Trials. To date he is the only person to have served a prison sentence for the events in Cephalonia.

Major Harald von Hirschfeld was never tried for his role in the massacre since he did not survive the war: in December 1944, he became the Wehrmacht's youngest general officer, and was killed while fighting at the Dukla Pass in Poland in 1945. Only Hirschfeld's superior commander, General Hubert Lanz, was sentenced to 12 years imprisonment at the so-called "Southeast Case" of the Nuremberg Trials for the Cephalonia massacre, as well as the participation of his men in other atrocities in Greece like the massacre of Kommeno on 16 August 1943. He was released in 1951 and died in 1982. Lt Colonel Barge was not on the island when the massacre was taking place. He was subsequently decorated with the Knight's Cross of the Iron Cross for his service in Crete. He died in 2000.

The reason for Lanz's light sentence was that the court at Nuremberg was deceived by false evidence and did not believe that the massacre took place, despite a book about the massacre by padre Formato published in 1946, a year before the trial. Because there was doubt as to who issued what order, Lanz was only charged with the deaths of Gandin and the officers. Lanz lied in court by stating he had refused to obey Hitler's orders to shoot the prisoners because he was revolted by them. He claimed that the report to Army Group E, claiming 5,000 soldiers were shot, was a ruse employed to deceive the army command in order to hide the fact that he had disobeyed the Führer's orders. He added that fewer than a dozen officers were shot and the rest of the Acqui Division was transported to Piraeus through Patras.

In his testimony, Lanz was assisted by affidavits from other Germans such as General von Butlar from Hitler's personal staff, who was involved in the Ardeatine massacre. The Germans were with Lanz in September 1943 and swore that the massacre had never taken place. In addition, for reasons unknown, the Italian side never presented any evidence for the massacre at the Nuremberg trials. It is speculated that the Italians, reeling from armistice terms highly unfavourable for their country, refused to cooperate with the trial process. Given the circumstances the court accepted Lanz's position that he prevented the massacre and that the event never happened. Consequently, Lanz received a lighter sentence than General Rendulic for his misdeed in Yugoslavia, who was released in late 1951 nevertheless, after only three years of imprisonment.

Lanz's defence emphasised that the prosecution had not presented any Italian evidence for the massacre and claimed that there was no evidence the Italian headquarters in Brindisi had ever instructed Gandin and his Division to fight. Therefore, according to the logic of the defence, Gandin and his men were either mutineers or franc-tireurs and did not qualify for POW status under the Geneva conventions.

The Germans justified their behaviour by claiming the Italians were negotiating the surrender of the island to the British. The German claim was not entirely unfounded: in the Greek mainland, an entire division went over to the Greek guerrillas, and in the Dodecanese, the Italians had joined forces with the British, resulting in a two-month German campaign to evict them.

An attempt to revisit the case by the Dortmund state prosecutor Johannes Obluda in 1964 came to naught, as the political climate in Germany at the time was in favour of "putting the war behind". In 2002 Dortmund prosecutor Ulrich Maass reopened a case against certain persons responsible for the massacre. In his office, along with a map of the world, Maaßs displayed a map of Cephalonia with the dates and locations of the executions as well as the names of the victims. No indictments or arrests resulted from Maass' investigation.

In 2013, Alfred Stork (1923 – 28 October 2018), a 90-year-old German ex-corporal, was sentenced in absentia to life imprisonment for his role in the massacre by a military court in Rome.

== Interpretations and perspectives on the Cephalonia Massacre: the historical debate in Italy ==
In Italy, the traditional interpretation of the Cephalonia Massacre places the event in the context of the Resistance against Nazi-fascism. Within this framework, there are readings that view the soldiers of the Acqui Division as genuine anti-fascists. There are also interpretations that see them as patriots who decided not to surrender their weapons and decided to fight and die for their country and for the King. In both cases, the resistance nature of the event lies in the awareness of choice, which transforms those soldiers from mere executors of orders into "volunteer" fighters. Despite the Acqui Division having fought the Germans following an order from the Supreme Command, in fact, the majority of its troops expressed the desire to oppose the Germans before such order arrived on the island.

According to this interpretation, the choice to resist the Germans, voluntary and conscious, was also majority, if not plebiscitary: therefore, the Division faced the clash as a compact force. From this point of view, the well-established disputes that emerged before the battle between the "rebel" officers and the "hesitator" Gandin are interpreted as the opposition between the impetuosity of young men eager to fight and the wise family man negotiating with the Germans, who would like to save the honor of the arms and the lives of his soldiers: a simple generational contrast that does not question the unity of intentions between the commander and his subordinates.

These are the pillars upon which the idea of Cephalonia as the "first act of the Resistance" is based, often mentioned in memoirs and present in the work of authoritative historians.

From the very beginning, polemical readings of the facts have opposed the canonical interpretation: on the one hand, some survivors expressed very critical judgments against the actions of General Gandin, considered too weak or even intending to betray to bring the Division into the German field; on the other hand, others accused some young officers, predominantly reserves, identifying in their rebellion against Gandin the main cause of a useless clash and the fierce reprisal that followed.

The fracture among the survivors corresponds to two historiographical interpretations of the facts that, although diametrically opposed, can both be traced within the realm of revisionism, understood as criticism of the dominant thought.

The historical researcher Massimo Filippini accuses the young 'rebel' officers. The main culprit, among the many who immediately sided with the clash against the Germans, is identified in the person of Captain Renzo Apollonio, to whom Filippini also attributes the disgrace of having collaborated with the Germans after the battle. According to Filippini, Apollonio and the others were guilty of insubordination, conspiracy, and rebellion, hindering Gandin's work, who, far from wanting to betray, was only seeking a peaceful and, above all, honorable solution to the complicated situation in which the Division found itself. Note that the hypothesis of incitement, together with a critical judgment on the action of Apollonio, has recently been taken up by a historian of undisputed value such as Elena Aga Rossi.

But Filippini's revisionism goes further; he is indeed one of the supporters of the legitimacy of the execution of Italian prisoners, basing his affirmation on the well-known argument that, in the absence of a declaration of war, these were to be considered franc-tireurs, an argument devoid of legal basis, as detailed by Marco De Paolis.

Opposed to those of Filippini and Aga Rossi are the theses of the historian Paolo Paoletti, the main accuser of Gandin, according to whom the general acted with the intention of leading the Division into the German field after the armistice. Paoletti goes beyond the accusations of ineptitude and weakness commonly directed at the general by his detractors: Gandin, from the outset, intended to hand over the armed division to the Germans to continue fighting alongside them and, to this end, negotiated with them. Reversing Filippini's view, according to Paoletti, the young "rebel" officers and, in particular, Captain Renzo Apollonio were heroes, whose initiative thwarted the plan of the "traitor" Gandin. Therefore, Gandin betrayed his own country, trying to bring the Division over to the enemy's side, but he also betrayed the Germans when, forced by his subordinates, he ordered the Acqui to fight against the Wehrmacht; for this reason, according to Paoletti, Gandin was not shot alongside the other officers.

More recently, interpretations have been added to the canonical and revisionist readings of the affair, shifting the choice of the soldiers of the Acqui from the ideological sphere to the moral one. According to Gian Enrico Rusconi, the first desire of those men was to return home, but not at all costs: keeping their weapons, safely and honorably, as befits a soldier who has done his duty. This is a significant downsizing of the epic of Cephalonia, which, however, does not deprive the soldiers of the Acqui of a 'heroic' aspect: not the heroism of the political martyr or the soldier faithful to the extreme sacrifice, but that of the good family man who tries to make his way back home, refusing to yield to dishonorable compromises.

Even Patrizia Gabrielli proposes an unconventional reading of the facts, according with her the distance from home, the loss of the role of head of the family, now fully covered by the women at home, the apathy and frustration due to the long inactivity may have pushed those men to fight to reclaim, against the humiliating conditions imposed by the Germans, their dignity, which actually never failed during that apparent holiday that, unlike what is described in the film 'Mediterraneo', did not make them lose their sense of responsibility.

Finally, Silvio Olivero tries to mediate between the different interpretations. Olivero, noting the diversity of views that characterized the soldiers of the Acqui in the approach to the clash and the multiplicity of possible motivations that led them to fight, all plausible and worthy of being remembered, identifies the main merit of those men precisely in their capacity to smooth over differences. According to Olivero: "Moved by such different motivations (loyalty to the Crown, military obedience, anti-fascism, the desire for redemption, the desire to return home honorably), the soldiers of the Acqui were therefore the first Italians to leave behind the fierce divisions that in Italy would have caused countless deaths"; in Cephalonia "the divisions that in Italy would have led to civil war were revealed, but the soldiers of the Acqui knew how to overcome them: they were the first fighters of the Resistance, but also - and above all - the first Italians who regained unity by overcoming the differences that opposed them".

== Commemoration ==
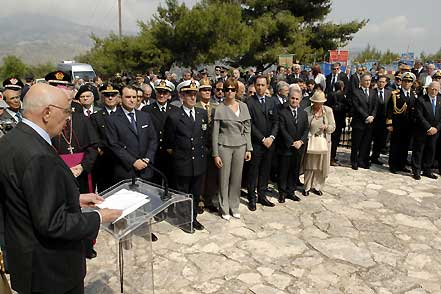
The Italian President Giorgio Napolitano in Cephalonia during remembrance ceremonies in honour of the soldiers of the 33rd Infantry Division "Acqui"

In the 1950s, the remains of about 3,000 soldiers, including 189 officers, were exhumed and transported back to Italy for burial in the Italian War Cemetery in Bari. The remains of General Gandin were never identified.

The subject of the massacre was largely ignored in Italy by the press and the educational system until 1980, when the Italian President Sandro Pertini, a former partisan, unveiled the memorial in Cephalonia. The massacre provided the historical background to the 1994 novel Captain Corelli's Mandolin. Despite the recognition of the event by Pertini, it was not until March 2001 that another Italian President, Carlo Azeglio Ciampi, visited the memorial again, and even then he was most likely influenced by the publicity generated by the impending release of the Hollywood film Captain Corelli's Mandolin, based on the novel with the same name. Thanks to these actions today a large number of streets in Italy are named after "Divisione Acqui".

During the ceremony Ciampi, referring to the men of the Acqui Division, declared that their "conscious decision was the first act of resistance by an Italy freed from fascism" and that "they preferred to fight and die for their fatherland". The massacre of the Acqui Division is emerging as a subject of ongoing research, and is regarded as a leading example of the Italian Resistance during World War II.

In 2002, Poste Italiane issued the commemorative stamp Eccidio della Divisione Aqui.

The Presidents of Greece and Italy periodically commemorate the event during ceremonies taking place in Cephalonia at the monument of the Acqui Division. An academic conference about the massacre was held on 2–3 March 2007 in Parma, Italy.

Cephalonia's Greco-Italian Society maintains an exhibition called "The Mediterraneo Exhibition", next to the Catholic church in Argostoli, where pictures, newspaper articles and documents showcasing the story of the massacre are displayed.

== See also ==
- Massacre of Kos
- List of massacres in Greece
- War crimes of the Wehrmacht
