= Johannes Barge =

Nazi officer (1906–2000)

- Born: 23 March 1906
- Died: 28 February 2000 (aged 93)
- Military career
- Allegiance: Nazi Germany
- Branch: Army
- Service years: 1934–45
- Rank: Oberst
- Commands: Festungs-Grenadier-Regiment Kreta
- Conflicts: World War II: Cephalonia Massacre

Johannes Barge (23 March 1906 – 28 February 2000) was an officer in the Wehrmacht of Nazi Germany during World War II who was responsible for German military operations causing the Cephalonia Massacre in September 1943.

== Awards and decorations ==
- German Cross in Gold on 28 July 1943 as Major in Infanterie-Bataillon 550 z.b.V.
- Knight's Cross of the Iron Cross on 10 May 1945 as Oberst and commander of Festungs-Grenadier-Regiment Kreta (Note: Unlawful presentation of the Knight's Cross of the Iron Cross to Johannes Barge by the Dönitz Government after 8 May 1945. This can be verified by the radio communication dated on 21 May 1945. The presentation date was backdated by Walther-Peer Fellgiebel. Barge was a member of the Association of Knight's Cross Recipients.)
