= Antonio Gandin =

Italian general (1891–1943)

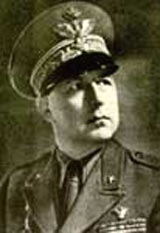
Antonio Gandin

Antonio Gandin (13 May 1891 – 24 September 1943) was an Italian general, who was killed in Cephalonia in September 1943 during the Massacre of the Acqui Division.

== Biography ==
Antonio Gandin was born in Avezzano in 1891, son of Pietro, prefect of the kingdom and of Colomba Desideri. Coming from a family originally from Bagnaia (a hamlet of Viterbo) with strong military traditions, (his brother Aldo, born in 1895, was also a general in the Royal Army, while his brother Vittorio was an engineer. His nephew Ugo, son of the sister Lucia was a well-known magistrate), Gandin had a degree in literature, attended the Royal Military Academy of Modena and obtained the rank of second lieutenant in 1910. He participated in the Italian-Turkish war on the Libyan front between 1911 and 1912; he became a lieutenant and fought the war against the Austro-Hungarian Empire in the ranks of the 136th regiment, earning a silver medal, a bronze medal and two war crosses for military valor. After the end of the First World War he held important positions on behalf of the Ministry of War, then of the SIM, then taught at the War School. He was promoted to colonel in 1935 and commanded the 40th Infantry Regiment; in 1937 he entered the General Staff of the Royal Army.

Promoted to brigadier general in 1940, he was part of the Italian Supreme Military Command until 1942, when he became general of the Italian Royal Army and obtained a German honor during the fighting of the CSIR, then ARMIR, on the Russian front.

From 16 June 1943, Gandin was commander of the "Acqui” Division; on 24 September 1943 he was shot by the Germans for not wanting to accept unconditional surrender. He was a staunch admirer of Adolf Hitler and wanted to side with the Germans. However, he held a "referendum" among the soldiers (actually an informal consultation, since it would have been impossible to consult all the soldiers scattered on the island), who voted to remain loyal to Italy. Gandin commanded a stubborn and unfortunate resistance against the Germans themselves that led to the massacre of Kefalonia. His remains have not been recovered.

The barracks of the 1st Regiment "Granatieri di Sardegna" in Rome are dedicated to him.
