= MV Mario Roselli =

Italian cargo ship

History

Italy
- Name: Mario Roselli
- Builder: Cantieri Riuniti dell'Adriatico
- Launched: 25 April 1941
- Acquired: 22 April 1942
- In service: 23 April 1942
- Fate: Bombed and sunk, 11 October 1943

General characteristics
- Type: Cargo ship
- Tonnage: 6,835 gross register tons (GRT) 9,100 long tons deadweight (DWT)
- Length: 138.61 m (454.8 ft)
- Beam: 18.92 m (62.1 ft)
- Draught: 12.10 m (39.7 ft)
- Installed power: 7,500 hp (5,593 kW)
- Propulsion: Diesel engine, single screw
- Speed: 15.8 knots (29.3 km/h; 18.2 mph)

Mario Roselli was an Italian cargo ship, confiscated by Nazi Germany, which was sunk by Allied aircraft on 11 October 1943 in Corfu Bay, killing 1,302 Italian POWs.

== Ship history ==
The Mario Roselli was built by Cantieri Riuniti dell'Adriatico in 1940. Launched on 25 April 1941, the ship was delivered to the customer on 22 April 1942 and seized the next day in Trieste by the Italian Navy which incorporated it in its auxiliary war fleet.

Her first mission was the supply of Italian troops stationed in Libya, sailing between Brindisi and Benghazi. On 12 June 1942, on passage to Benghazi, the ship was substantially damaged by Allied aircraft and towed to Taranto for repairs. On 19 December she returned to service on the route Naples - Palermo - Bizerte.

On 9 September 1943, the day after the Armistice between Italy and Allied armed forces, Mario Roselli was confiscated by the Germans and used to transport Italian POWs to Venice and Trieste.

=== The disaster in Corfu Bay ===
On 9 October 1943 the ship arrived in Corfu to take some 5,500 Italian prisoners on board. They were transferred from shore to ship using small boats. At 7:15 on 10 October, when the boarding was almost finished, an Allied aircraft appeared and immediately attacked the ship and motorboats. One bomb hit a motorboat crammed with prisoners. Another fell directly through an open hatch into the hold of the ship crowded with Italians, and exploded, causing terrible carnage. The ship leaned towards starboard and took water. Surviving prisoners tried to escape by jumping into the sea, but many drowned. In total there were 1,302 victims.

The German guards opened fire on prisoners still on land who tried to escape.

The Mario Roselli was abandoned in the harbor, but was attacked again the next day and sank.

=== Recovery and reconstruction ===
In 1952 the wreck of the Mario Roselli was salvaged and towed to Monfalcone for reconstruction. She had a second career between 1952 and 1972, when she was sold to be scrapped in England.
