= 33rd Infantry Division "Acqui" =

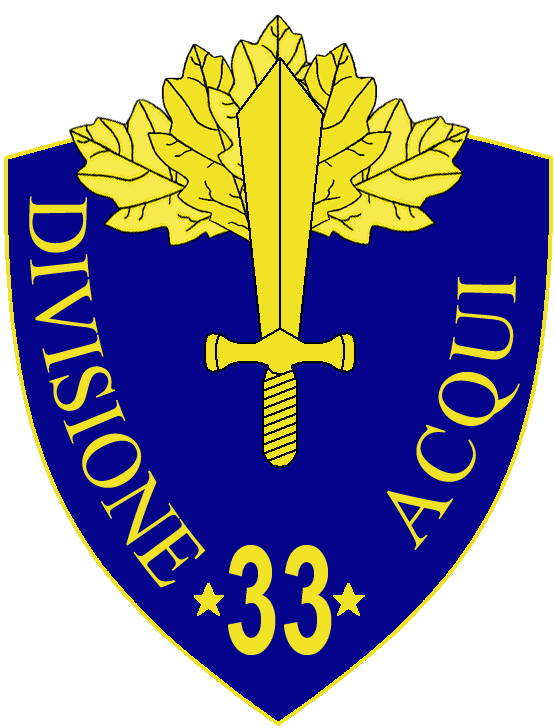
- 33rd Infantry Division "Acqui" insignia
- Active: 1939–1943
- Country: Kingdom of Italy
- Branch: Royal Italian Army
- Role: Infantry
- Size: Division; 12,000 soldiers
- Part of: XXVI Army Corps
- Garrison/HQ: Meran
- Engagements: World War II

Commanders
- Notable commanders: Ernesto Chiminello; Antonio Gandin

Insignia
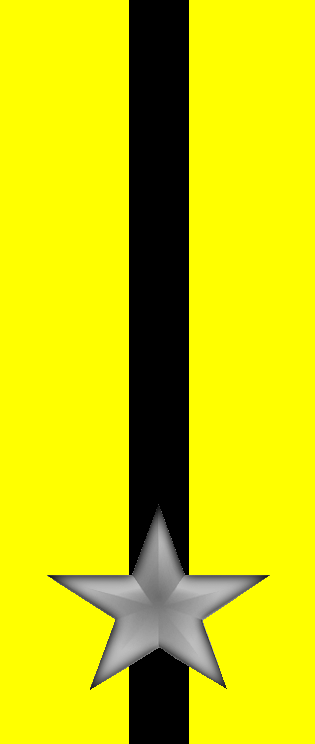
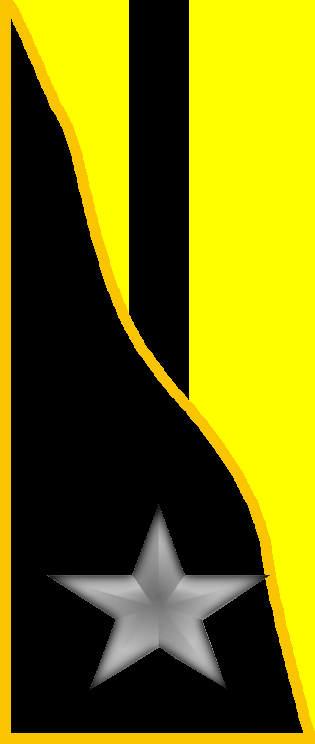
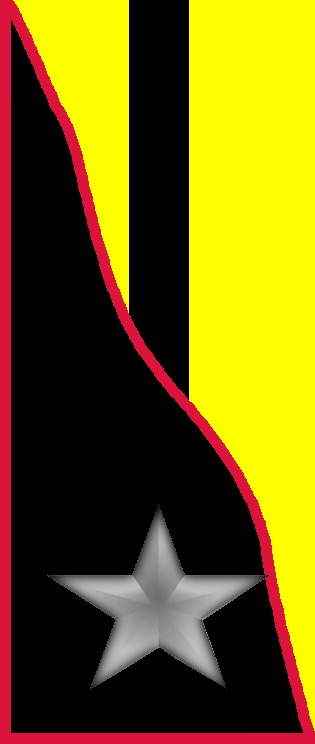
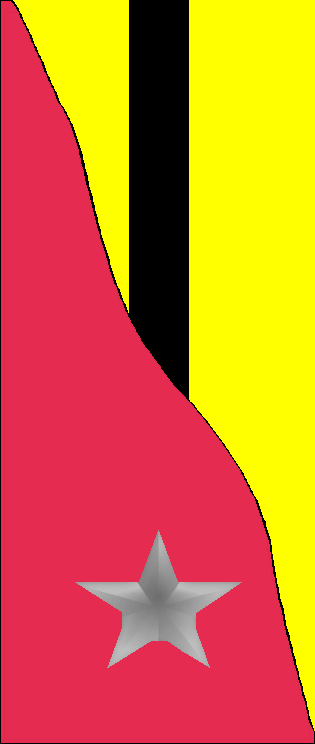
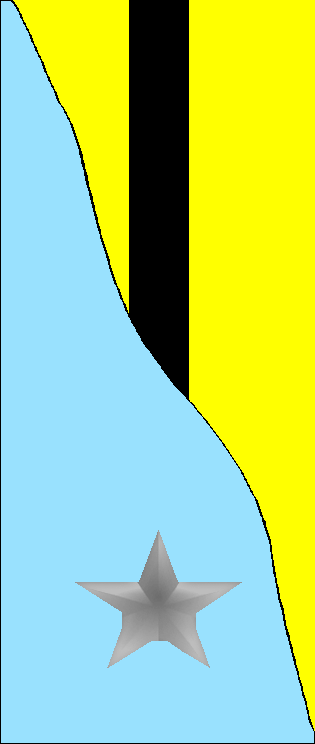
- Identification symbol: Acqui Division gorget patches

The 33rd Infantry Division "Acqui" (Italian: 33ª Divisione di fanteria "Acqui") was an infantry division of the Royal Italian Army during World War II. The Acqui was a mountain-type infantry division, which meant that the division's artillery and logistics were moved by pack mules, while in standard infantry divisions artillery and logistics were moved by horse-drawn limbers and carriages. Italy's real mountain warfare divisions were the six alpine divisions manned by Alpini troops. The division was named for the city of Acqui. The division is notable for having been massacred with remarkable cruelty after surrendering to the Germans on 21 September 1943. The main detachments of the Acqui division in the islands of Cephalonia and Corfu were officially dissolved 25 September 1943.

== History ==
The division's lineage begins with the Brigade "Acqui" established on 21 December 1821, which on 25 October 1831 split to form the 1st and 2nd infantry regiments under the brigade's command. On 4 May 1839, the two regiments were re-numbered as 17th and 18th infantry regiments.

=== World War I ===
The brigade fought on the Italian front in World War I. On 15 October 1926 the brigade command was disbanded and the brigade's two regiments were transferred to other brigades: the 17th Infantry Regiment "Acqui" to the XIV Infantry Brigade and the 18th Infantry Regiment "Acqui" to the XI Infantry Brigade.

In August 1939 the 33rd Infantry Division "Acqui" was formed in Meran and received on the same date its two namesake infantry regiments. On the same day the 33rd Artillery Regiment "Acqui" was reformed and assigned to the division.

=== World War II ===
==== Invasion of France ====
On 10 June 1940 the Italian invasion of France commenced and the Acqui engaged French forces in the Maddalena Pass-Argentera-Colle del Ferro area. After France surrendered to Germany in the evening of 22 June 1940, the Acqui crossed into French territory on 23 June 1940. Meeting weak opposition the division advanced to La Condamine-Châtelard. On 24 June 1940 the Acqui reached the Ubaye Valley, but at this point a Franco-Italian Armistice came into effect and the Acqui division returned Italy. The division's casualties in this campaign amounted to 32 dead, 15 missing, 90 wounded and 198 frostbitten.

==== Greco-Italian War ====
On 6 December 1940 the Acqui was ordered to move to Albania to reinforce the crumbling Italian front in the Greco-Italian War. The division arrived north-west of Vuno in the Himarë municipality on 18 December 1940 and was ordered to reinforce the positions of the 51st Infantry Division "Siena" in the Shushice river valley. On 19 December 1940 the Acqui battled a Greek offensive trying to capture Vlorë. For the rest of December the Acqui remained in its defensive posture. In January 1941 a bitter fight for the Qafa e Hazërit mountain trail started. The Qafa e Hazërit trail changed hands several times. In early February 1941 the division was pulled back to Smokthinë in the Shushice river valley to rest and refill its depleted ranks. In March 1941 the Acqui was again deployed to the front at Kakoz. In the course of the German-led Battle of Greece the Acqui attacked on 14 April 1941 at Bolenë, Horë-Vranisht and Maja e Mesimerit. On 16 April the Greek army began an organized retreat and the Acqui took the direct route to the border town of Konispol and then entered the Greek province of Filiates. On 20 April 1941 the Acqui captured Igoumenitsa and Syvota.

Between 20 December 1940 and 23 April 1941, the casualties in the Acqui Division were 481 killed, 1,163 missing, 1,361 wounded and 672 frostbitten. After the Greek surrender the Acqui became the part of the occupation force on the islands of Corfu, Lefkada, Zakynthos and Cephalonia. To reinforce the thinly spread troops, the division was reinforced in May 1942 by the 317th Infantry Regiment "Acqui". During 1942, the division headquarters were briefly relocated to Lefkada before moving to Cephalonia in May 1943.

==== Massacre of the Acqui Division ====
After the Armistice of Cassibile was announced on 8 September 1943 the division resisted German orders to surrender. In retaliation the Germans executed thousands of the division's soldiers in what is known as the "Cephalonia massacre". One of the largest prisoner of war massacres of the war, and one of the largest-scale German atrocities to be committed by Wehrmacht troops, Of the division's approximately 12,000 soldiers 1,300 died fighting the Germans and between 5,200 and 6,000 soldiers and all the division's officers were murdered by the German 1st Mountain Division.

The events in Cephalonia were repeated, to a lesser extent, elsewhere: in Corfu, the 8,000-strong Italian garrison comprised elements of three divisions, including the Acqui's 18th Regiment Infantry Regiment, and the I Battalion, 49th Infantry Regiment "Parma" from the 49th Infantry Division "Parma". On 24 September, the Germans landed a force on the island, and by the next day they were able to induce the Italians to capitulation. All 280 Italian officers on the island were executed during the next two days on the orders of General Hubert Lanz, in accordance with Hitler's directives. The bodies were loaded onto a ship and disposed of in the sea. Similar executions of officers also occurred in the aftermath of the Battle of Kos, when the Italian commander and 90 of his officers were shot.

Many of the Acqui's soldiers, who had survived the massacres on Cephalonia and Corfu died in the subsequent weeks:

- On 28 September 1943 the ship P.fo Ardena either struck a naval mine or was intentionally scuttled by explosive charges. Of the 840 Italian POWs on board, 720 perished.
- On 10 October 1943, the ship Mario Roselli was bombed while anchoring in Corfu bay and severely damaged by allied aircraft. Out of more than 5,000 Italian POWs 1,302 perished.
- On 13 October 1943, the ship P.fo Marguerita was sunk, presumably after striking a naval mine, after departing from Argostoli, Cephalonia. 544 Italian POWs perished.

== Organization ==
33rd Infantry Division "Acqui" organization in 1940

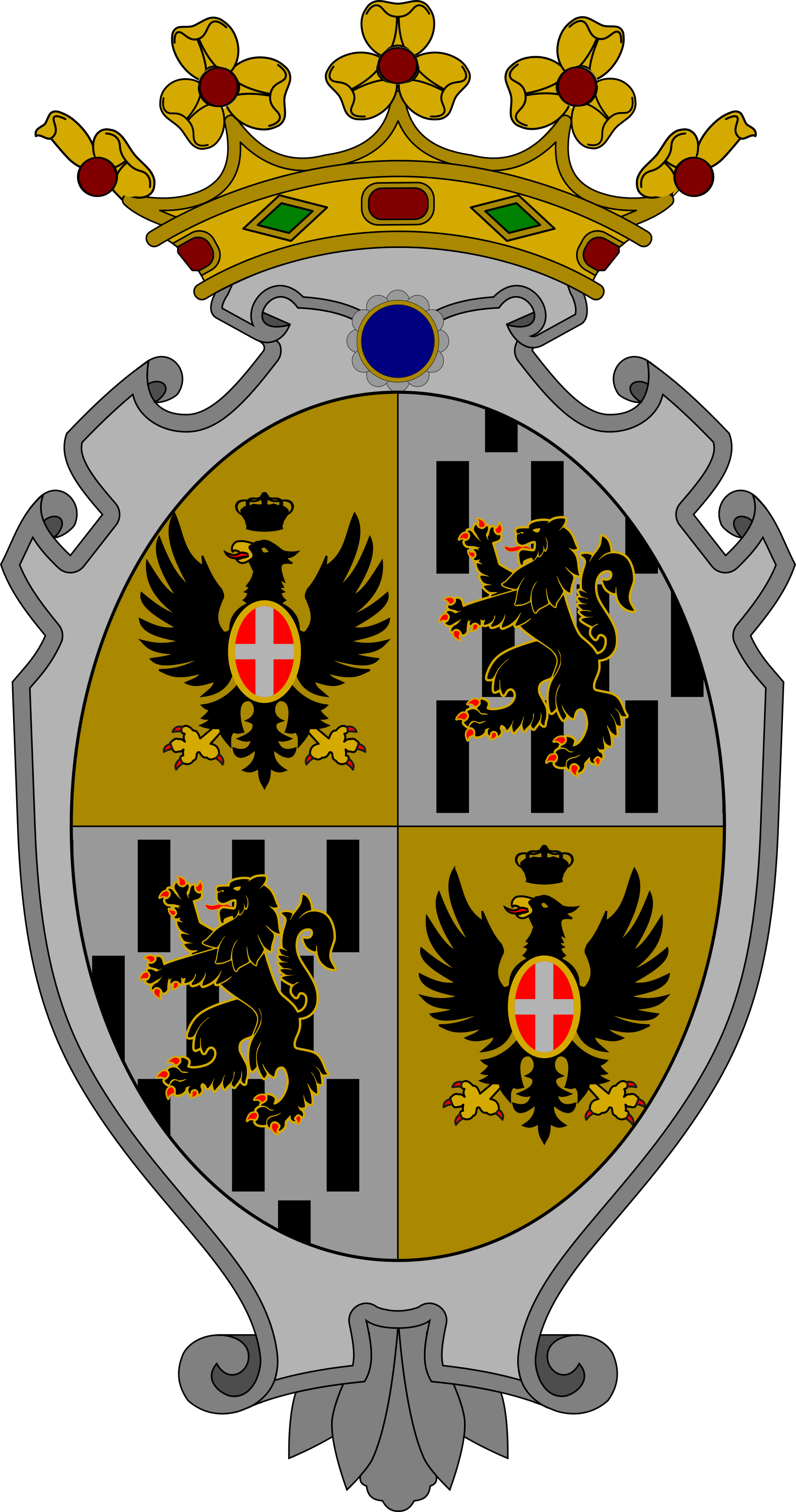
Coat of Arms of the 18th Infantry Regiment "Acqui", 1939

- 33rd Infantry Division "Acqui", in Meran
  - Headquarters
    - Command Company
    - 27th Carabinieri Section
    - 30th Carabinieri Section
    - 2nd Field Post Office
    - 33rd Infantry Division Command Transport Squad
  - 17th Infantry Regiment "Acqui", in Schlanders
    - Command Company
    - 3 × Fusilier battalions
    - Support Weapons Battery (65/17 mod. 13 infantry support guns)
    - Mortar Company (81mm mod. 35 mortars)
  - 18th Infantry Regiment "Acqui", in Meran
    - Command Company
    - 3 × Fusilier battalions
    - Support Weapons Battery (65/17 mod. 13 infantry support guns)
    - Mortar Company (81mm mod. 35 mortars)
  - 317th Infantry Regiment "Acqui" (raised on 1 November 1941 by the depot of the 18th Infantry Regiment "Acqui", joined the division in Greece in May 1942)
    - Command Company
    - 3 × Fusilier battalions
    - Cannons Company (47/32 mod. 35 anti-tank guns)
    - Mortar Company (81mm mod. 35 mortars)
  - 33rd Artillery Regiment "Acqui", in Trento
    - Command Unit
    - I Group (100/17 mod. 14 howitzers)
    - II Group (75/13 mod. 15 mountain guns; detached to the 56th Infantry Division "Casale" in 1943)
    - III Group (75/13 mod. 15 mountain guns)
    - 33rd Anti-aircraft Battery (20/65 mod. 35 anti-aircraft guns)
    - 333rd Anti-aircraft Battery (20/65 mod. 35 anti-aircraft guns; formed later)
    - Ammunition and Supply Unit
  - XXXIII Mortar Battalion (81mm mod. 35 mortars)
  - 33rd Anti-tank Company (47/32 mod. 35 anti-tank guns)
  - 31st Engineer Company
  - 33rd Telegraph and Radio Operators Company
  - 3rd Medical Section (replaced in Greece by the 44th Medical Section)
    - 3 × Field hospitals
    - 1 × Surgical unit
  - 5th Supply Section
  - 33rd Autocarrette Section
  - 143rd Transport Section

Attached to the division from early 1940 to 14 November 1940:

- 23rd CC.NN. Legion "Bersaglieri del Mincio"
  - XX CC.NN. Battalion
  - XXIII CC.NN. Battalion
  - 23rd CC.NN. Machine Gun Company

Attached to the division from 14 November 1940 until early 1942:

- 18th CC.NN. Legion "Costantissima"
  - XIX CC.NN. Battalion (remained attached to the division until September 1943)
  - XXVII CC.NN. Battalion
  - 18th CC.NN. Machine Gun Company

Attached to the division in 1943:

- CX Machine Gun Battalion
- III Anti-aircraft Group (75/27 C.K. anti-aircraft guns; formed by the 2nd Anti-aircraft Artillery Regiment)
- VII Group (105/28 cannons; formed by the 3rd Army Corps Artillery Regiment)
- XCIV Group (155/36 heavy guns; formed by the 2nd Army Artillery Regiment)
- CLXXXVIII Group (155/14 PB howitzers)

== Military honors ==
For their conduct after the announcement of the Armistice of Cassibile on Cephalonia and Corfu the President of Italy awarded on 16 February 1948 to the regiments of the 33rd Infantry Division "Acqui" Italy's highest military honor, the Gold Medal of Military Valor.

- 17th Infantry Regiment "Acqui" on 16 February 1948
- 18th Infantry Regiment "Acqui" on 16 February 1948
- 317th Infantry Regiment "Acqui" on 16 February 1948
- 33rd Artillery Regiment "Acqui" on 16 February 1948

== Commanding officers ==
The division's commanding officers were:

- Generale di Divisione Francesco Sartoris (August 1939 - 19 September 1940)
- Colonel Domenico Bonaccorsi (acting, 20 September - 9 October 1940)
- Generale di Brigata Adamo Mariotti (10 October 1940 - 13 February 1941)
- Generale di Divisione Luigi Mazzini (14 February 1941 - 25 October 1942)
- Generale di Divisione Ernesto Chiminello (26 October 1942 - 20 June 1943)
- Generale di Divisione Antonio Gandin (21 June 1943 - 24 September 1943; executed by the Germans)

== Division "Acqui" ==
In 2002 the Italian Army activated three division commands, with one of the three always readily deployable for NATO missions. Each division was given the traditions of a division that had served with distinction in World War II. Therefore on 31 December 2002 the 3rd Italian Division in San Giorgio a Cremano was renamed Division Command "Acqui".
