= Burmazi =

Albanian tribe in Herzegovina

- Albanian tribe
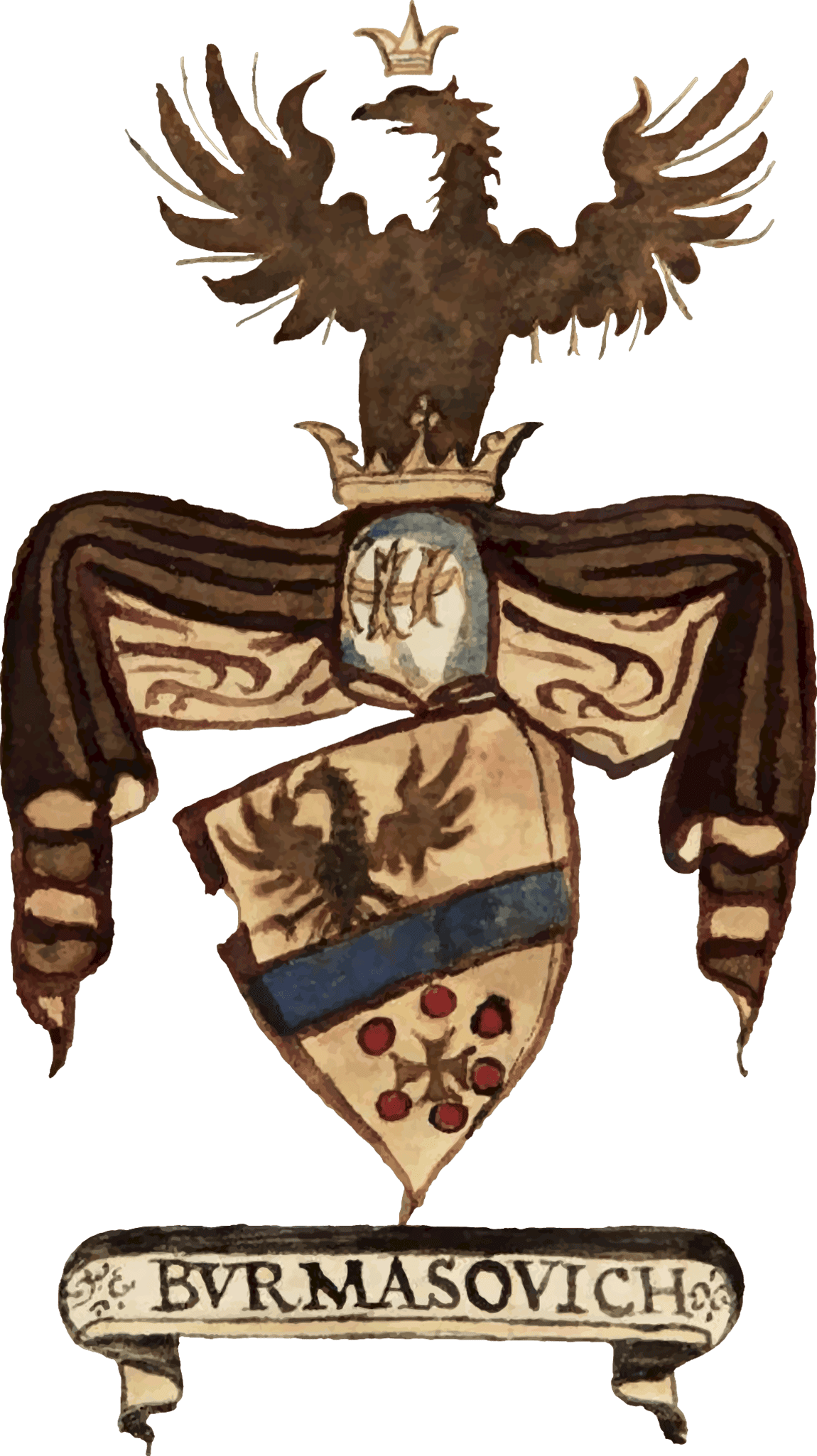
- Coat of arms of the Burmazi Family, as depicted in the "Insignia procerum Bosnae, Croatiae, Illyriae, &c, quorum alter liber unicus asservatur penes Ragusii rempublicam (p. 28)", published in 1700.
- Location: Herzegovina

Burmazi was an Albanian tribe which is attested in Herzegovina in the Middle Ages.

== Name ==
The name Burmazi is a compound of the Albanian words burr (man) + madh (big or great). The form Burmazi instead of Burmadhi signifies a retained characteristic from an older phase in the Albanian language before /z/ settled into the voiced dental fricative /ð/.

== History ==
The Burmazi are first mentioned in 1300 as a Vlach katun, that is a semi-nomadic community based on kinship ties that lived in non-permanent settlements, located in the area around Stolac and Trebinje. In the archives of Ragusa they are grouped together in terms of social and economic organization with the also pastoral Vlachs whose name figured as inclusive of all semi-nomadic pastoralists in the area, but recorded as Albanians otherwise. By 1343 they had elevated in social status and began to appear in Ragusan documents also as traders between the hinterlands of Herzegovina and Ragusa.

Over time they were Slavicized. This process started in the late 14th century when they gradually moved from being bilingual in Albanian and Slavic to monolingual in Slavic only. This is reflected also in their anthroponymy as personal names like Burmaz started to be used in their Slavic translation, Velislav. By the early 15th century they began to settle permanently in the area of the modern village Burmazi and were further concentrated in Ljubomir and Domaševo in Trebinje. The village of Arbanaška has also been linked to them. In the defter of the Sanjak of Herzegovina from 1470, Burmazi appears as distinct nahiye of 40 settlements. The Ottoman conquest of Herzegovina saw a threefold demographic change in Burmazi. A part of the people converted to Islam and started to move in the newly formed Ottoman urban centres of Bosnia. A larger part left the area and settled in the Dalmatian Hinterland in Šibenik and the village of Ogorje in Muć, in the island of Korčula, especially in Vela Luka, in the village of Blata, in Makarska and in Kaštel in Istria. A later third wave of emigration occurred towards Serbia in the area of Vrnjacka Banja.

The brotherhoods of Burmazi also included the Zotovići, the Milkovići and the Gledjevići, who since the late 14th century formed their own branch and gradually became one of the urban families of Ragusa with estates around Trebinje.

The earlier, non-Slavic form of Zotović is Zot, which means lord in Albanian. Geographer Jevto Dedijer who traveled in the village to study its history noted that this earlier form was inscribed in the village in older family monuments like a cross that bore the name of village elder Petar Zot.

== Legacy ==
The Burmazi have left their name to the village of Burmazi, which is today divided between the municipalities of Stolac and Berkovići as a result of the Bosnian War. Those living in the part of the village located in the municipality of Stolac are mainly Croats, with a minority of Bosniaks, while those living in the now uninhabited area in the municipality of Berkovići were Serbs.

It is also presumed that the surnames Burmazović and Burmazević have their origin in this tribe.
