= Bjelojevići =

Bjelojevići may refer to:

- Bjelojevići, Stolac, a village in Bosnia and Herzegovina
- Bjelojevići, Montenegro, a village near Mojkovac
