= Fritz Neidholdt =

German Wehrmacht officer and war criminal

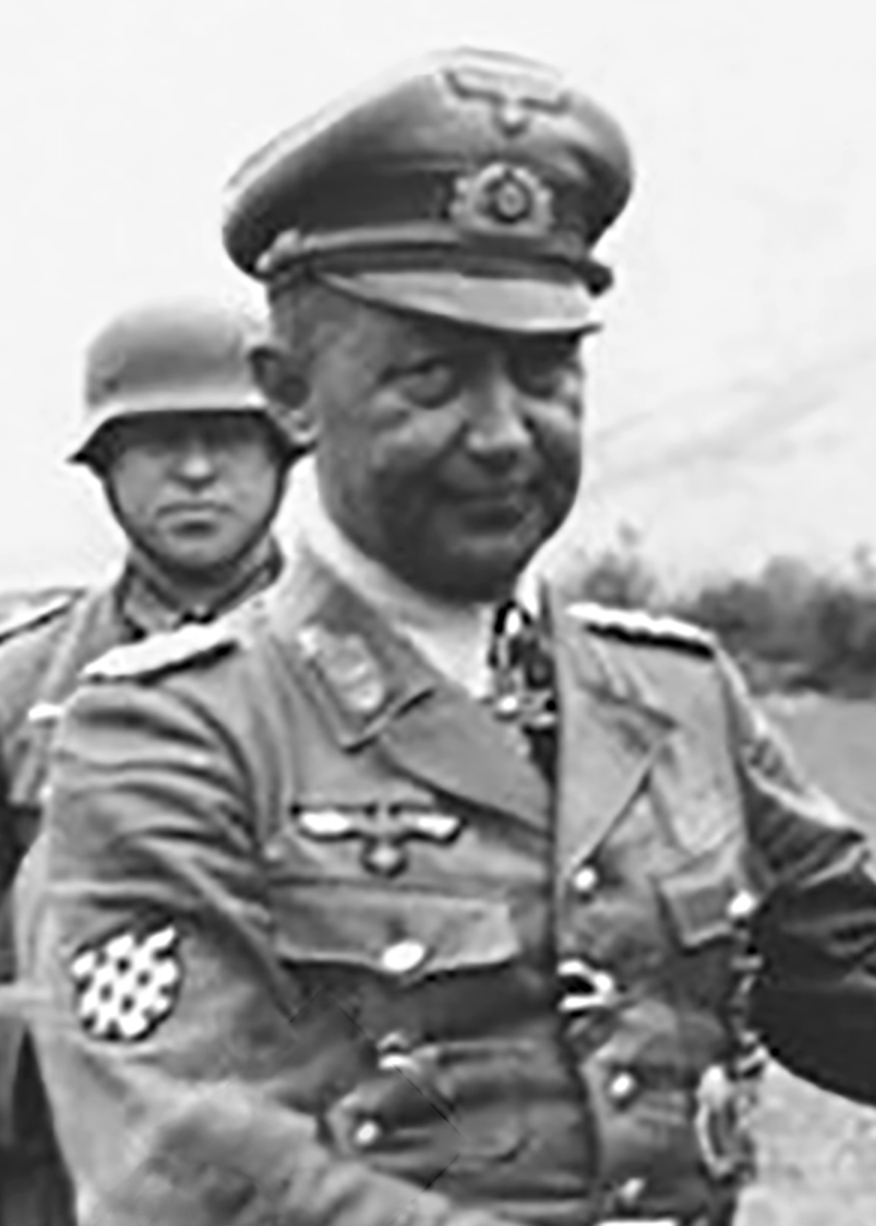
- Neidholdt between 1942 and 1944 (Croatian shield patch of the Devil's Division on his right sleeve)
- Born: 16 November 1887; Sankt Kilian, Kingdom of Prussia, German Empire
- Died: 5 March 1947 (aged 59); Belgrade, PR Serbia, FPR Yugoslavia
- Cause of death: Execution by firing squad
- Known for: War crimes of the Wehrmacht
- Conviction: War crimes
- Penalty: Death (1947)
- Military service
- Allegiance: German Empire; Weimar Republic; Nazi Germany
- Branch: Wehrmacht
- Service years: 1907–1945
- Rank: Generalleutnant
- Commands: 369th (Croatian) Infantry Division (1942–44)
- Conflicts: World War I; World War II

Fritz Neidholdt (16 November 1887 – 5 March 1947) was a German Wehrmacht general during World War II. Neidholdt was best known from 1942 to 1944 as commander of the 369th (Croatian) Infantry Division, a unit composed of Croatian personnel with German cadres, notorious for its brutality and nicknamed the Devil's Division. Neidholdt was extradited to Yugoslavia in 1947 where he was convicted as a war criminal, sentenced to death and executed.

== Early life ==
Fritz Neidholdt was born on 16 November 1887 in the small town of Sankt Kilian near Schleusingen, located at the southern end of the Thuringian Forest central-eastern Germany, his father was a Protestant pastor. After graduating from primary and secondary school, Neidholdt joined the Royal Prussian Army (Königlich Preussische Heer) on 30 August 1907 as a cadet (Fahnenjunker).

== Military career ==
At the beginning of the First World War, Neidholdt and his regiment were sent to the Western front, where he took part in the Siege of Namur. At the beginning of 1915, his unit was sent to fight Russian imperial forces near Bzura. Between March 1915 and April 1917 Neidholdt served at various positions at army, divisional, brigade, and company level on the eastern front. After the Reichswehr became the Wehrmacht, he retired from the army on 21 May 1935. On 1 December 1938, he returned as an officer in the army and in the spring of 1940, he led a regiment on the Western Front then commanded an infantry regiment for short time in Poland before ending up on the reserve list of the army high command.

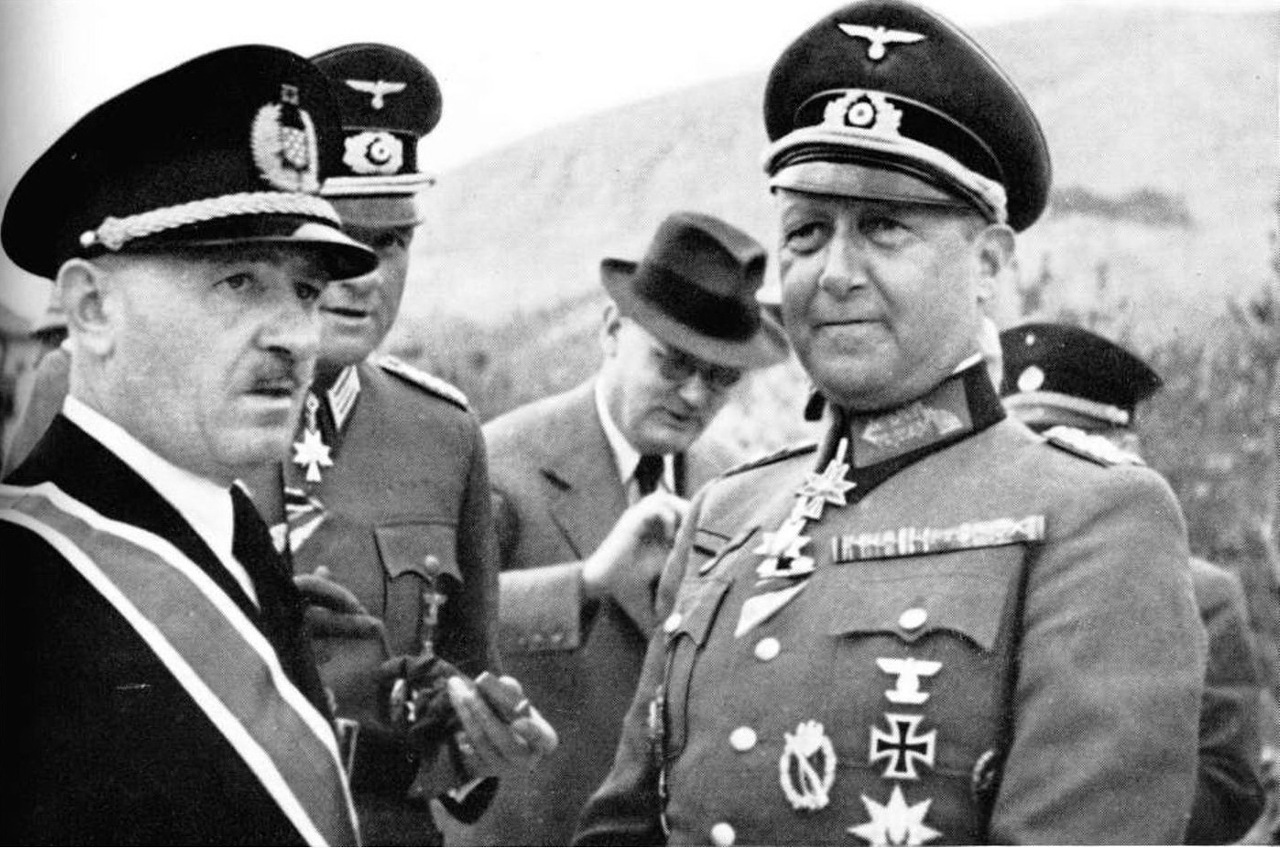
Fritz Neidholdt (right) with Croatian Premier Nikola Mandić

On 1 October 1942, Neidholdt was promoted to major general and appointed commander of the new 369th (Croatian) Infantry Division, a legionary unit composed of volunteers from the Independent State of Croatia under German cadres, based in Yugoslavia. The Division began formation in Stockerau, Austria with the survivors of the 369th Croatian Reinforced Infantry Regiment and new volunteers from Croatia, it adopted the nickname of Devil's Division, in honour of the 42nd Home Guard Infantry Division of the World War I Austro-Hungarian Army. The division was deployed in the Balkans against Yugoslav partisans at the beginning of 1943 instead of the Eastern Front as originally intended. Under Fritz Neidholdt's command the division took part in Operation Weiss (also known as the Fourth Axis Offensive) in northern Bosnia where, inexperienced in guerrilla warfare, it became notorious for its extreme brutality. The division then took part in Operation Schwarz in Northern Montenegro and southern Bosnia, where it reported the largest number of casualties of all the units engaged.

On 1 October 1943, Neidholdt was promoted to lieutenant general. According to British historian Ben H. Shepherd the only way in which the division he commanded distinguished itself was in the number of civilians it killed.

On 11 September 1944, under Fritz Neidholdt direct orders, the 369th division destroyed the villages of Zagniezde (Zagnježđe) and Udora (near Bjelojevići, Burmazi and Stolac), hanging all the men and driving away all the women and children. At the beginning of October 1944 he gave up command of the 369th Infantry Division.

Neidholdt was captured on 8 May 1945. Prosecuted as war criminal during the fourth process of the Yugoslav War Crimes Trials Proceedings (5–16 February 1947), he was tried along with six other major war criminals: Generaloberst Alexander Löhr (commander-in-chief of Army Group East), Generalleutnants Josef Kübler and Johann Fortner, Generalmajor Adalbert Lontschar, Oberst Gunther Tribukait and SS-Brigadeführer August Schmidhuber. All of them were sentenced to death and executed in mid-January 1947 after petitions for clemency were rejected.
