= 369th (Croatian) Infantry Division =

369th (Croatian) Infantry Division: 369. (Kroatische) Infanterie-Division; 369. (hrvatska) pješačka divizija
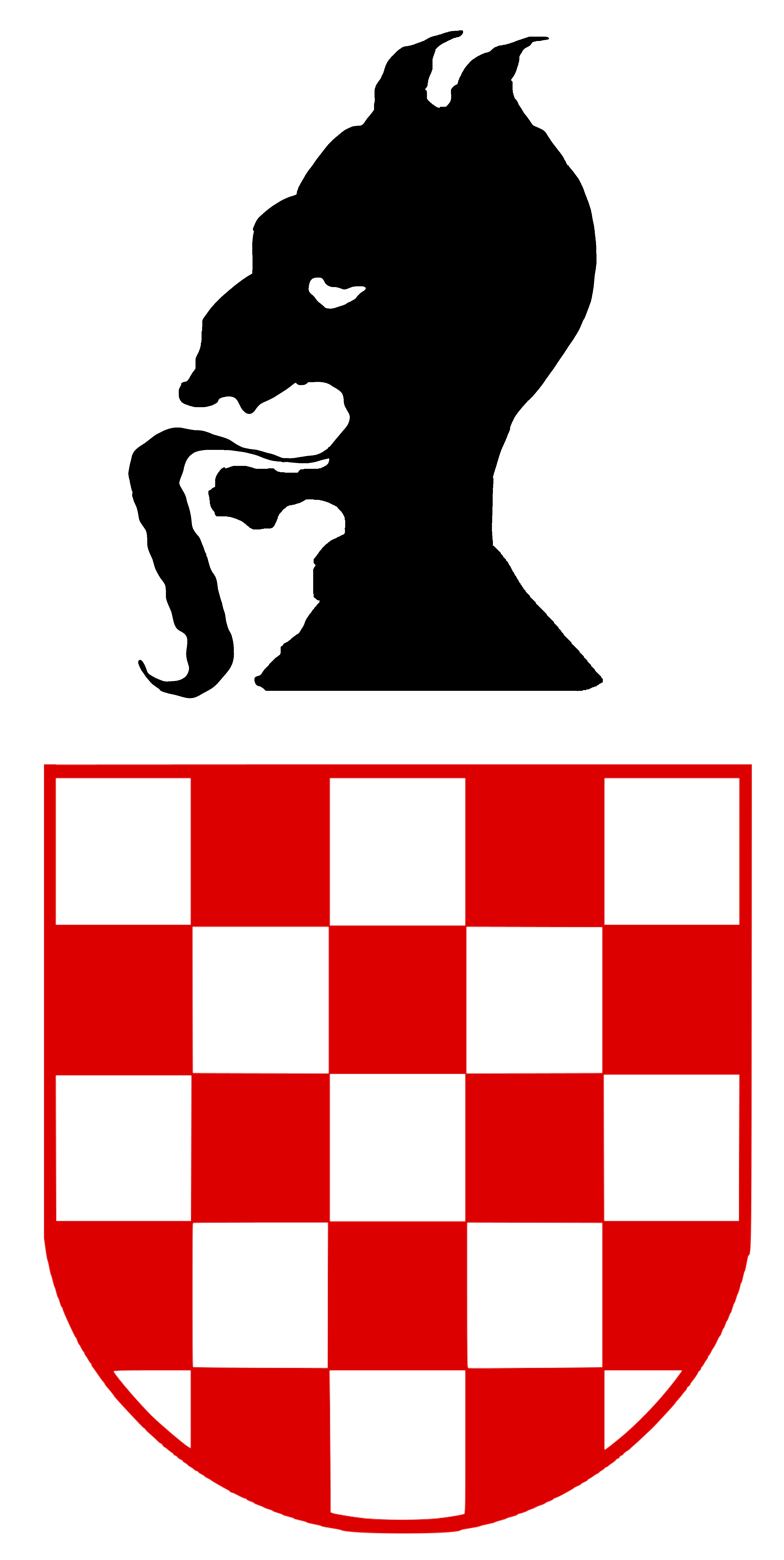
- The emblem of the 369th Legionary "Devil's" Division used on vehicles.
- Active: 1942–1945
- Allegiance: Nazi Germany; Independent State of Croatia
- Branch: German Army (Wehrmacht)
- Type: Infantry
- Role: Anti-Partisan operations
- Size: Division (14,000 men)
- Garrison/HQ: Stockerau, Wehrkreis XVII
- Nickname: Devil's Division
- Mottos: Što Bog da i sreća junačka "By the grace of God and the fortune of heroes"
- Engagements: World War II; Operation Weiss; Operation Schwarz; Operation Kugelblitz; Operation Schneesturm; Operation Rösselsprung; Mostar Operation

Commanders
- Notable commanders: Fritz Neidholt (1942–44)

The 369th (Croatian) Infantry Division (German: 369. (Kroatische) Infanterie-Division, Croatian: 369. (hrvatska) pješačka divizija) was a legionary division of the German Army (Wehrmacht) during World War II.

It was formed with Croat volunteers from the Independent State of Croatia (NDH) and with surviving members of the 369th Croatian Reinforced Infantry Regiment annihilated during the battle of Stalingrad, in honour of which it received its ordinal. It adopted the nickname of Vražja Divizija (Devil's Division) as a tribute to the 42nd Landwehr Division of World War I, a Croatian unit of the Austro-Hungarian Army. Numbering 14,000 troops and organised into two infantry regiments, the division was commanded by about 3,500 German officers, non-commissioned officers, and specialists.

By December 1942, the German High Command chose to deploy the division in the Balkans to fight Tito's Communist Partisans. Its first major combat operation took place during Operation Weiss in northern Bosnia, it then participated in Operation Schwarz from 15 May to 16 June 1943, the two largest anti-guerrilla operations conducted by the Wehrmacht during the war. After the capitulation of Italy, the division operated alongside another Croatian Legion, the 373rd (Croatian) Infantry Division as well as the Waffen-SS Division “Prinz Eugen”, a division consisting mainly of Volksdeutsche from the NDH and the Banat, and other German and Croatian units.

On 11 September 1944, under orders from its commandant, the 369th division destroyed two villages near Stolac, hanging all the men and driving away all the women and children. According to British historian Ben H. Shepherd the only way in which this division distinguished itself was in the number of civilians it killed.

The last remaining personnel of the 369th formally surrendered to the British forces in May 1945. Following the Nuremberg Trial, General Neidholt, commandant of the division, was found guilty of war crimes; he was executed by firing squad on 5 March 1947.

== History ==
=== Formation ===
The 369th Infantry Division was a Croatian legionary division of the German Army (Wehrmacht) formed on 21 August 1942. Its forerunner, the 369th (Croatian) Infantry Regiment, had been attached to the 100th Jäger Division and virtually destroyed with it at the Battle of Stalingrad.

The division was assembled and trained at Stockerau and Dollersheim in Austria. The division attempted to cultivate the heritage of the 42nd Landwehr Division, a World War I Croatian unit of the Austro-Hungarian Army, which had been known as the "Devil's Division" (German: Teufel Division, Croatian: Vražja Divizija).

The division was organized into two infantry regiments, the 369th and the 370th. Two more Croatian legionary infantry divisions were formed the following year, the 373rd and the 392nd, nicknamed respectively "Tiger" and "Blue" Divisions. In contrast to other Wehrmacht divisions in the region, the three divisions had the particularity to be composed of Croat volunteers, commanded by German (or Austrian) officers.

Following its return from training in Austria, desertions began with an average of 25 men absent without leave from each company. There were a range of factors encouraging desertion, including reverses suffered by Axis forces in North Africa and at Stalingrad and elsewhere on the Eastern Front, Partisan propaganda and infiltration, and the work of politicians of the Croatian Peasant Party. Although originally intended for use on the Russian Front, the division did not deploy there and was returned to the Independent State of Croatia (NDH) in January 1943 due to the need to combat the Partisans. The division had low combat value in anti-Partisan fighting but distinguished itself with indiscriminate brutality.

=== Anti-partisan operations ===
==== 1943 ====
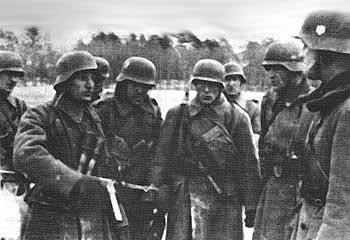
Soldiers of the 369th (Croatian) Infantry Division

The division participated in the first and in the second phase of Operation Weiss in late February and early March 1943. The division was attacked during disembarkment in Banija, even before it was fully developed for fight. Parts of 7th Banija Division attacked its reconnaissance battalion near Kostajnica on 28 December 1942. On 3 January Partisans destroyed two trains near Blinjski Kut, one of which was carrying elements of 369th Division. On 15 January reinforced anti-tank battalion was engaged in fierce combat at Blinja. Even before Operation Weiss started on 20 January, the division already had suffered 51 dead, 99 wounded and 8 missing.

In Operation Weiss I 369th Division, reinforced with elements of the 187th Reserve Division and with 3rd Mountain Brigade of the NDH, had a task to advance from Petrinja area towards the road Slunj - Bihać, to "comb" the terrain, and to destroy partisan groups and deport the population. First it had to overcome the stiff resistance of the 7th Banija Division. Division reached Bosanska Krupa on 1 February, when 7th SS division had already taken Bihać, and partisan 7th Banija Division had to redeploy its main forces to block the advancement of the SS troops. 369th Division then continued with the operation, proceeded with circling Grmeč in close connection with 7th SS and 717th Division. After the encirclement of Grmeč was completed, 369. Division had a task to "comb" northern slopes of the mountain. After partisans and the mass of the population succeeded to break out of the encirclement, Weiss I was finished with 15 February. In the operation, 369th Division lost 110 dead, 188 wounded, and 54 missing.

Operation Weiss II started on 25 February, and 369th Division with 7th SS Division constituted the southern attack group. Division advanced through Mrkonjić Grad and Šipovo, and with its reconnaissance battalion captured Livno on 5 March.

In April 1943, the 369th Division participated in Operation Teufel III against the Chetniks on the Ozren mountain in eastern Bosnia. Although the Ozren Chetniks collaborated with the Axis since 1942, there were several Chetnik sabotages and attacks carried out in late 1942 and early 1943, which prompted the command of the 369th Division to organize an offensive against them. Reinforced with elements of the Croatian Home Guard, the division inflicted heavy casualties on the Chetniks. The Ozren and Zenica Chetnik groups were forced to surrender most of their weapons and allow undisturbed passage through their territory to the German and NDH troops. The 369th Division had 16 killed and 34 wounded soldiers in the operation.

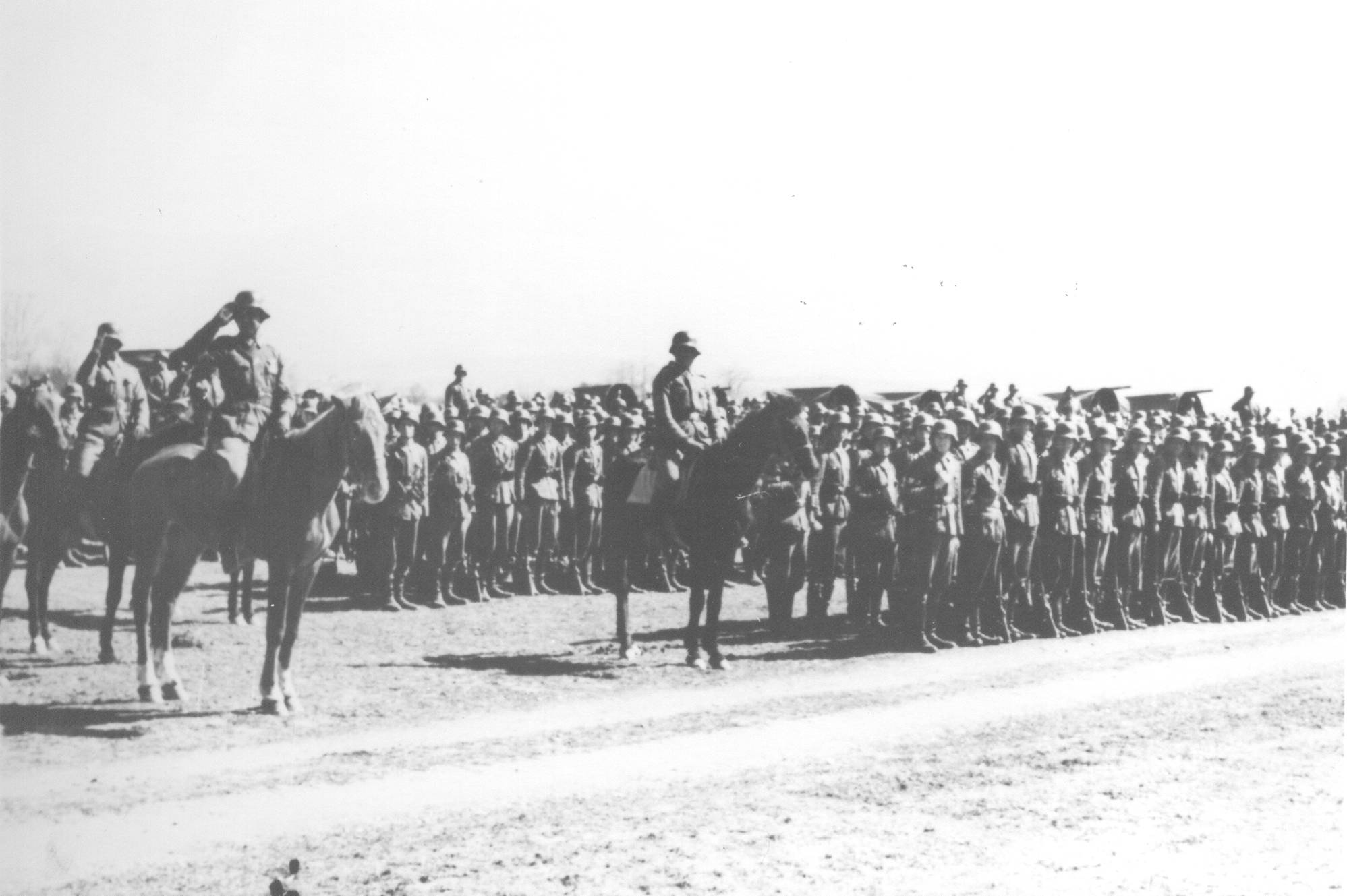
Parade of the 369th Infantry Division in Sarajevo on March 21, 1943

The division also participated in Operation Schwarz. During the preparatory actions for taking starting positions, the division on 6 May pushed partisans back and unblocked Italian Battalion Aosta and Chetniks, who were under partisan siege in Foča. During the final stage of the operation, the division was holding the part of the encirclement on the northern slopes of Zelengora, but the 1st Proletarian Brigade on 10 June successfully broke out through the division's positions, followed by other partisan units. Total reported losses of the divisions were 92 dead, 263 wounded, and 233 missing.

After the Operation Schwarz, strong Partisan battle group penetrated into eastern Bosnia, destroying Ustasha garrisons Vlasenica, Srebrenica, Olovo, Kladanj and Zvornik on its way. 7th SS and 369th Division were tasked with fighting this forces. 369th Division had a number of clashes with the Partisans, especially in the area of Zvornik in early July.

In September 1943, total strength of the division was 12.883 men, 3.701 of which were Germans.

During September, after the capitulation of Italy, the Partisans gained the momentum. Most of German reinforcements were engaged in operations aimed to seize positions on the Adriatic coast. 369th Div participated in the ensuing major operations alongside 373rd Croatian Inf Div and 7th SS Div Prinz Eugen as well as other Croatian and German troops with the goal of disarmaming Italian garrisons in Dalmatia and Herzegovina.

7th SS Division was used for the attack on Split, by which the zone of responsibility of the 369th Division was expanded. On 10 September Partisans took Gacko, on 11 September Vlasenica, on 24 September Gračanica, on 29 September Zvornik, and in the neighbouring zones Partisans took Modriča, Šamac, Bijeljina, and other towns. On 29 September Partisans attacked Tuzla, an important garrison held by 369th Division and Home Guard units. After four days of street fighting, Tuzla fell to Partisans, and the commander of the 369th Artillery Regiment lieutenant colonel Kuchtner saved himself by escaping to the Chetnik territory. Battle Group Fischer (main force of the 369th Infantry Regiment reinforced with artillery, 187th Reserve Division elements, and Home Guard formations) defended Doboj and sought to recapture Tuzla, in cooperation with the parts of the LXIX Corps from Brčko. In early October 3 Battalion of the 370th Regiment in Višegrad fell under attack of the strong Chetnik battle group from Serbia. After Višegrad, the Chetniks took Rogatica on 13 October, but after 20 October their short-lived anti-German activity ceased. The division recaptured Tuzla from Partisans on 11 November.

Desertions worsened particularly after the capitulation of Italy in September 1943. For example, during October 1943, 489 men deserted from the division.

In October 1943, the Germans confirmed that the division would not be utilised on either the Western Front or the Russian Front, and would continue to serve in the NDH.

For several months from early December 1943, elements of the division took part in series of operations by the V SS Mountain Corps against the Partisans in eastern Bosnia known in the former Yugoslavia as the Sixth Enemy Offensive. However, the offensive failed to decisively engage the Partisans.

==== 1944 ====
In early March 1944 the division replaced the 7th SS Division in Herzegovina, with division headquarters seated in Mostar. Towns and communications in eastern Herzegovina were defended together with local Chetnik units. While taking new positions, 1st Battalion of the 369th Regiment was on 6 March ambushed by Partisans at Zavala near Trebinje, with losses of 58 dead.

Over the following months the division, together with the NDH forces and the Chetniks, fought the Partisans without decisive success. On 26 and 28 March Anti-Tank Battalion with artillery elements, the NDH police unit, and Chetnik detachment, carried out an attack from Stolac towards Ljubinje. On 5 April an attack with similar forces was carried out towards Žegulja, and 13 May from Stolac to Hrgud.

The reconnaissance battalion of the division was involved in Operation Rösselsprung.

From 13 to 31 July main forces of the division, reinforced with 3rd Battalion of the 4th Regiment Brandenburg, and with six Chetnik brigades and a battalion of the 9th Home Guard Brigade under the division's command, carried out operation Sonnenstich against the Partisan 29th Herzegovina Division in eastern Herzegovina. The operation was completed without significant results. During the operation, a mutiny occurred in 2nd Battalion of the 370th Grenadier Regiment. The battalion was withdrawn from the combat and disarmed, with a number of soldiers court-marshaled and shot.

On 11 September 1944, under orders from General Fritz Neidhold, the division destroyed the villages of Zagniezde (Zagnježđe) and Udora (near Bjelojevići, Burmazi and Stolac), hanging all the men and driving away all the women and children.

After Tuzla was captured by the partisans on 17 September 1944, the 369th Infantry Division experienced a swell in desertions by its non-German members; among the ranks of II./370 battalion, German officers and liaisons were spontaneously murdered by some of their Croatian subordinates.

On 21 September Trebinje garrison, consisting of the reinforced 1st Battalion of the 369th Grenadier Regiment, Italian Fascist Legion San Marco, and parts of the 9th Home Guard Brigade, came under an attack of the Vojislav Lukačević Chetnik group. At that time, Lukačević decided to start hostilities with the Germans, and assembled a formation of some 4.000 men. Since fortifications of outer defence of Trebinje were held by mixed German and Chetnik crews, the Chetniks used one routine crew change to disarm and capture German personnel. With outer positions secured, Lukačević issued an ultimatum, demanding garrison surrender. After the Chetnik assault on Trebinje that followed had failed, the Chetnik held Trebinje under the siege until 25 September. On that day, a reinforced battalion of the 118th Jäger Division attacked from Dubrovnik, and pushed Chetniks away from Trebinje.

After Chetniks left, outer defence zone of Trebinje remained unoccupied. Partisans took advantage of that to infiltrate into the void, and the position of the garrison became critical. The Partisan attack begun on 4 October, and only small groups from Trebinje garrison managed to evade death or capture. 18 men strong group of sergeant Teimer reached Dubrovnik, and sergeant Müller's group of twelve crossed over the mountains and reached Mostar. Some 350 soldiers from 369th Division, and around 80 soldiers of 9th Home Guard Brigade were killed or captured.

=== Final months ===
The division saw action against the Partisans until the end of the war. However, by April 1945 it was down to battlegroup strength having lost most of its German officers and with the Croatian manpower of the division numbering between 2,000 and 3,000 soldiers.

During the last few weeks of the war, what was left of the division fought in north-west Bosnia and Slavonia retreating towards Austria. After moving through northern Croatia, it broke up and various groups in the area of northern Slovenia and Austria. On 11 May 1945 the division, less one company, was stopped and disarmed by Partisan forces. The remaining group attacked a brigade of Partisans near Dravograd as it tried to cross into Austria; on 15 May 1945 most of the Croatian Armed Forces survivors formally surrendered.

In total 160 officers and 2,876 men from the 369th Croatian surrendered to the British, they were then separated with the Germans members of the division assigned to a camp near Griffen in Austria and never sent back to Yugoslavia as prisoners of war. The Croatian soldiers were turned over to the Yugoslav Partisans who executed most of them. In 1946 Generalleutnant Fritz Neidholt the commander of the division was extradited, tried for war crimes and executed by firing squad on 5 March 1947.

== Organisation ==
The composition of the division in September 1943 was as follow:

- 369th (Croatian) Grenadier Regiment (I, II, III battalions)
- 370th (Croatian) Grenadier Regiment (I, II, III battalions)
- 369th (Croatian) Panzerjäger Battalion
- 369th Reconnaissance Battalion
- 369th (Croatian) Artillery Regiment (I, II, III battalions)
- 369th Pioneer Battalion
- 369th (Croatian) Signals Battalion
- 369th Divisional Supply Troops

On 28 December 1944 after reaching battle group strength, the division absorbed the 1001st and 1012th Fortress Infantry Battalions

== Commanders ==
The commanders of the 369th (Croatian) Infantry Division were:

- Generalleutnant Fritz Neidholt (21 August 1942 – 5 October 1944) (Note: “Neidholdt was promoted to major general on 1 October 1942, and to lieutenant general on 1 October 1943)
- Generalleutnant Georg Reinicke (5 October 1944 – 8 May 1945) (Note: “Reinicke became a major general on 1 January 1945, and to lieutenant general on 1 May 1945)

== See also ==
- World War II in Yugoslavia
- Seven anti-Partisan offensives
- Resistance during World War II
- Anti-partisan operations in World War II

== Sources ==
=== Books ===
- Brnardic, V.; Aralica, V. (2016). World War II Croatian Legionaries: Croatian Troops under Axis Command 1941–45. Men-at-Arms. Bloomsbury Publishing. ISBN 978-1-4728-1768-6.
- Komnenović, Danilo; Kreso, Muharem (1979). 29. Hercegovačka divizija [29th Herzegovina Division]. Beograd: Vojnoizdavački zavod. OCLC 6943302.
- Littlejohn, D. (1979). Foreign Legions of the Third Reich: Albania, Czechoslovakia, Greece, Hungary, and Yugoslavia. R.J. Bender Pub. ISBN 978-0-912138-29-9.
- Mitcham, S.W. (2007). German Order of Battle: 291st-999th Infantry divisions in World War II. Stackpole Books. ISBN 978-0-8117-3437-0.
- Nafziger, G.F. (1999). The German Order of Battle: Infantry in World War II. Greenhill Books. ISBN 978-1-85367-393-1.
- Schraml, F. (1962). Kriegsschauplatz Kroatien. Die Deutsch-kroatischen Legions-Divisionen-369., 373., 392 (in German).
- Shepherd, B. (2012). "The Devil's Division: The 369th Infantry Division in Bosnia, 1943". In Shepherd, B. (ed.). Terror in the Balkans: German Armies and Partisan Warfare. Harvard University Press. pp. 215–235. ISBN 9780674048911.
- Tomasevich, J. (1975). War and Revolution in Yugoslavia, 1941–1945:The Chetniks. Stanford University Press. ISBN 978-0-8047-0857-9.
- Tomasevich, Jozo (2001). War and Revolution in Yugoslavia, 1941–1945: Occupation and Collaboration. Vol. 2. San Francisco: Stanford University Press. ISBN 978-0-8047-3615-2.
- United States. Department of State; United States. War Department; International Military Tribunal (1946). Nazi Conspiracy and Aggression. U.S. Government Printing Office.

=== Journals ===
- Eyre, Lieutenant-Colonel Wayne D. (2006). "Operation RÖSSELSPRUNG and The Elimination of Tito, May 25, 1944: A Failure in Planning and Intelligence Support". The Journal of Slavic Military Studies. 19 (2). Informa UK Limited: 343–376. doi:10.1080/13518040600697969. ISSN 1351-8046. S2CID 144383512.
- Bokun, Edi (2013). "Operacija 369. njemačke divizije protiv ozrenskih četnika (april 1943. godine)" [Operation of German 369th Division Against Ozren Chetniks (in April 1943)] (PDF). Gračanički glasnik - Časopis za kulturnu historiju (in Bosnian). 18 (35). Gračanica, Bosnia and Herzegovina: Izdavačka kuća »Monos« d.o.o: 58–69.
- Shepherd, Ben (2009). "With the Devil in Titoland: A Wehrmacht Anti-Partisan Division in Bosnia-Herzegovina, 1943". War in History. 16 (1): 77–97. doi:10.1177/0968344508097618. ISSN 1477-0385. S2CID 110198876.
- Trifkovic, Gaj (2011). "A Case of Failed Counter-Insurgency: Anti-Partisan Operations in Yugoslavia 1943". The Journal of Slavic Military Studies. 24 (4): 314–336. doi:10.1080/13518046.2011.572733. ISSN 1556-3006. S2CID 143233788.
