= Burmazović =

Burmazović (Serbian Cyrillic: Бурмазовић) is a Serbian patronymic surname meaning "son of Burmaz". It is possibly related to Burmazi, the name of a medieval Albanian tribe in Herzegovina.

Notable people with the name include:

- Ivana Ivanović-Burmazović (born 1971), Serbian professor
- Tatjana Burmazović (born 1984), Serbian volleyball player

== See also ==
- Burmazi, Stolac, a village in Berkovići Municipality, Bosnia and Herzegovina
- Borisav Burmaz (born 2001), Serbian footballer
