= Günther Tribukait =

WW2 German army officer & war criminal (1909-1947)

- Born: 29 May 1909; Greifswald, German Empire
- Died: 26 February 1947 (aged 37); Belgrade, Yugoslavia
- Military career
- Allegiance: Nazi Germany
- Branch: Wehrmacht
- Service years: ?–1945
- Rank: Oberst
- Conflicts: World War II: World War II in Yugoslavia
- Awards: Knight's Cross of the Iron Cross

Günther Tribukait (sometimes referred to as Tribukeit or Tribukayt) was a German officer in the Wehrmacht during World War II and recipient of the Knight's Cross of the Iron Cross. After the war, Tribukait was tried for war crimes in Yugoslavia; he was convicted and executed in 1947. He was found guilty of mass executions of non-combatants, destruction of homes, kidnapping of civilians, and the torture and murder of prisoners of war.

== Trial and execution ==
Towards the end of the war, Tribukait was taken prisoner by the Yugoslav Partisans. The 118th Jäger Division – and other Mountain and Jäger divisions as well – were involved in numerous war crimes throughout the Balkans, carrying out, among others, harsh retaliations against the civilian population, especially Serbs and Greeks. Until his trial, he was held in a POW camp at the outskirts of Belgrade.

Tribukait had the lowest rank of the defendants of the fourth process of the Yugoslav War Crimes Trials Proceedings (5–16 February 1947). He was tried along with six other major war criminals: Generaloberst Alexander Löhr (commander-in-chief of Army Group E), Generalleutnant Josef Kübler, Johann Fortner and Fritz Neidholdt, Generalmajor Adalbert Lontschar and the SS-Brigadeführer August Schmidthuber. All of the defendants were found guilty of "mass executions of non-combatants, especially of women and children, destruction and razing of homes, kidnapping of Yugoslav civilians to concentration camps and torture and murder of POWs."

All of them were sentenced to death. According to a witness, Löhr and the six other convicts were imprisoned again in the POW camp outside of Belgrade – evidently, Löhr spent his last hours "in a small prison cell, bound in chains and wearing only his underwear". During the night of 25/26 February 1947, ten convicts – among them Tribukait – were picked up by a truck and were driven to the place of execution, where they were executed by hanging in the early hours of 26 February 1947.

== Awards ==
- Knight's Cross of the Iron Cross on 8 February 1943 as Major and commander of Jäger-Battalion 5

== Sources ==
- Meyer, Hermann Frank (2009). Blutiges Edelweiß: Die 1. Gebirgs-division im zweiten Weltkrieg (in Greek). Vol. 2. Athens, Greece: Estia's Bookstore. ISBN 978-960-05-1425-4.
- Meyer, Hermann Frank (2006). Von Wien nach Kalavryta. Die blutige Spur der 117. Jäger Division durch Serbien und Griechenland (in Greek) (4th ed.). Athens, Greece: Estia's Bookstore. ISBN 960-05-1112-8.

Military offices
| Preceded by none | Commander of Jäger-Bataillon 5; 1942–1943 | Succeeded by none |
| Preceded by none | Commander of Jäger-Regiment 750; 1944–1945 | Succeeded by Oberst Herbert Lindenblatt |
