= Gleđević family =

Gleđević, less commonly spelled Gledjević (Latin: Glegia, Glegieuich) was a Ragusan family hailing from Trebinje. They had possessions in modern Berkovići, in southern Bosnia and Herzegovina, where the toponym Gleđevići has survived. They were of Albanian origin, having been a brootherhood of the Albanian Burmazi tribe, however since the late 14th century they formed their own branch and gradually became one of the urban families of Ragusa with estates around Trebinje.

- Antun Gleđević (1669–1728), Ragusan poet, known misogynist
- Rade Gleđević, Ragusan merchant
- Obrad Gleđević (1427–1435), katunar
- Radosav Gleđević (1434), katunar
- Marin Gleđević

== See also ==
- Gleđ
