= Alexander Löhr =

Austrian Air Force commander

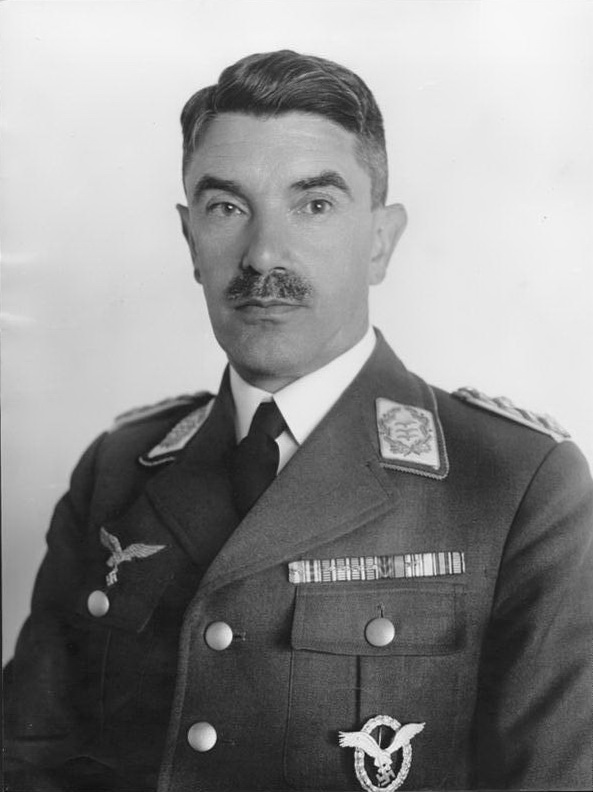
- Löhr in 1939
- Born: 20 May 1885; Turnu-Severin, Mehedinți, Kingdom of Romania
- Died: 26 February 1947 (aged 61); Belgrade, PR Serbia, FPR Yugoslavia
- Cause of death: Execution by firing squad
- Relatives: ∞ 1919 Christine Johanna Fellner
- Military career
- Allegiance: (Austria-Hungary) Austria–Hungary; (Austria) First Austrian Republic; Nazi Germany
- Branch: Austro-Hungarian Army; Bundesheer; Austrian Air Force; Luftwaffe
- Service years: 1906–1945
- Rank: Generaloberst
- Commands: Luftflotte 4 Army Group E OB Südost
- Conflicts: World War I; World War II; Invasion of Poland; Battle of Crete; Operation Retribution; Yugoslavia; Dodecanese Campaign
- Awards: Knight's Cross of the Iron Cross with Oak Leaves

Alexander Löhr (20 May 1885 – 26 February 1947) was an Austrian Air Force commander during the 1930s and, after the annexation of Austria, he was a Luftwaffe commander. Löhr served in the Luftwaffe during World War II, rising to commander of Army Group E and then to commander-in-chief in Southeastern Europe (OB Südost).

Löhr was captured by Yugoslav Partisans at the end of the war in Europe. He was tried and convicted of war crimes by the Yugoslav government for anti-partisan reprisals committed under his command, and the German bombing of Belgrade in 1941. He was executed by firing squad on 26 February 1947 in Belgrade, Yugoslavia.

== Early life and career ==
Löhr was born on 20 May 1885 in Turnu-Severin in the Kingdom of Romania. He was the youngest child of Friedrich Johann Löhr and his wife Catherine, née Heimann. His father had served as a 2nd captain on a hospital ship in the Black Sea during the Russo-Turkish War. Here his father had met his mother, a Ukrainian nurse. She was the daughter of the military doctor Mihail Alexandrovich Heimann from Odessa. After the war, they married in 1879 and moved to Turnu-Severin in Romania. The marriage produced three sons. Due to his mother's faith, he belonged to the Eastern Orthodox Church; he grew up speaking German, Russian, French and Romanian. Löhr attended a military secondary school in Kaschau, present-day Košice in Slovakia until 1900.

Löhr transferred to the infantry cadet school at Temeswar, present-day Timișoara in Romania, in January 1900. In 1903 he was posted to Vienna, where he attended the Theresian Military Academy in Burg Wiener Neustadt until 1906. He graduated from the military academy on 18 August 1906, with an overall rating of "very good". On the same day Löhr was retired as a second lieutenant and immediately volunteered for active service. Löhr served as platoon commander of a pioneer battalion in the Imperial and Royal 85th Infantry Regiment of the Austro-Hungarian Army in World War I. By 1921 Löhr had reached the rank of Lieutenant-Colonel. Between 1921 and 1934 he held many staff positions in the military, including Director of the Air Force in the Federal Armies Ministry. In 1934, he was made Commander of the small Austrian Air Force, a position which he held until the annexation in 1938.

== World War II ==
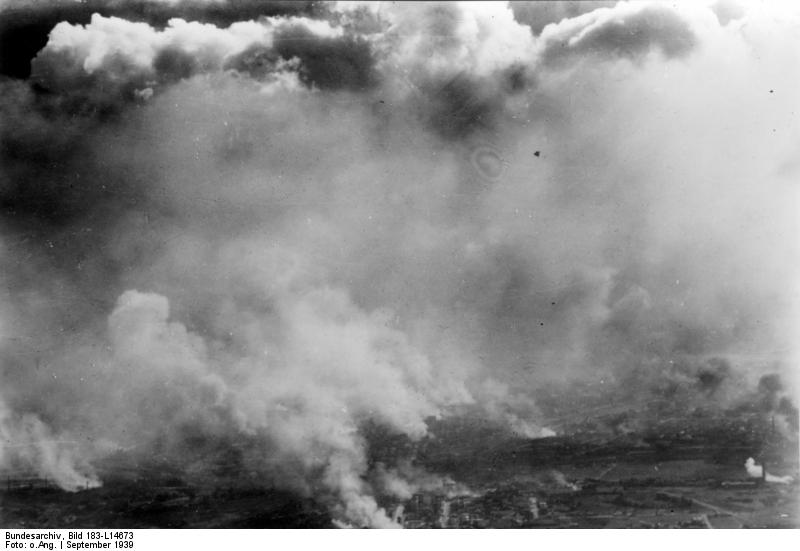
Warsaw burning, September 1939

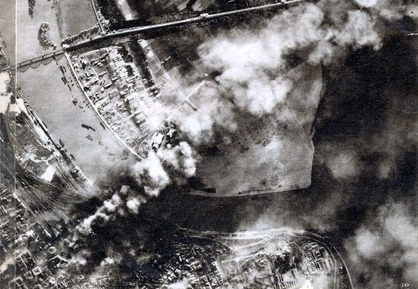
Belgrade burning, April 1941

Löhr, who had been promoted to Major on 1 July 1920, was accepted into the newly created Austrian Armed Forces on 1 September 1920. On 15 March 1938, Löhr was transferred to the Luftwaffe, where he became commander of Luftwaffe forces in Austria. By then he had been promoted to Generalleutnant. He was commander of Luftflotte 4 in the East from May 1939 until June 1942.

Luftflotte 4 carried out the bombing of Warsaw in September 1939 and the bombing of Belgrade in April 1941. Löhr had developed a plan to bomb Belgrade with incendiary bombs first, so that the fires would help the second, nighttime, attack to find the targets. This cost thousands of people their lives. Löhr was promoted to colonel general effective 3 May 1941. He commanded the 12th Army from 12 July 1942 through to December 1942.

=== Commander-in-Chief South East ===
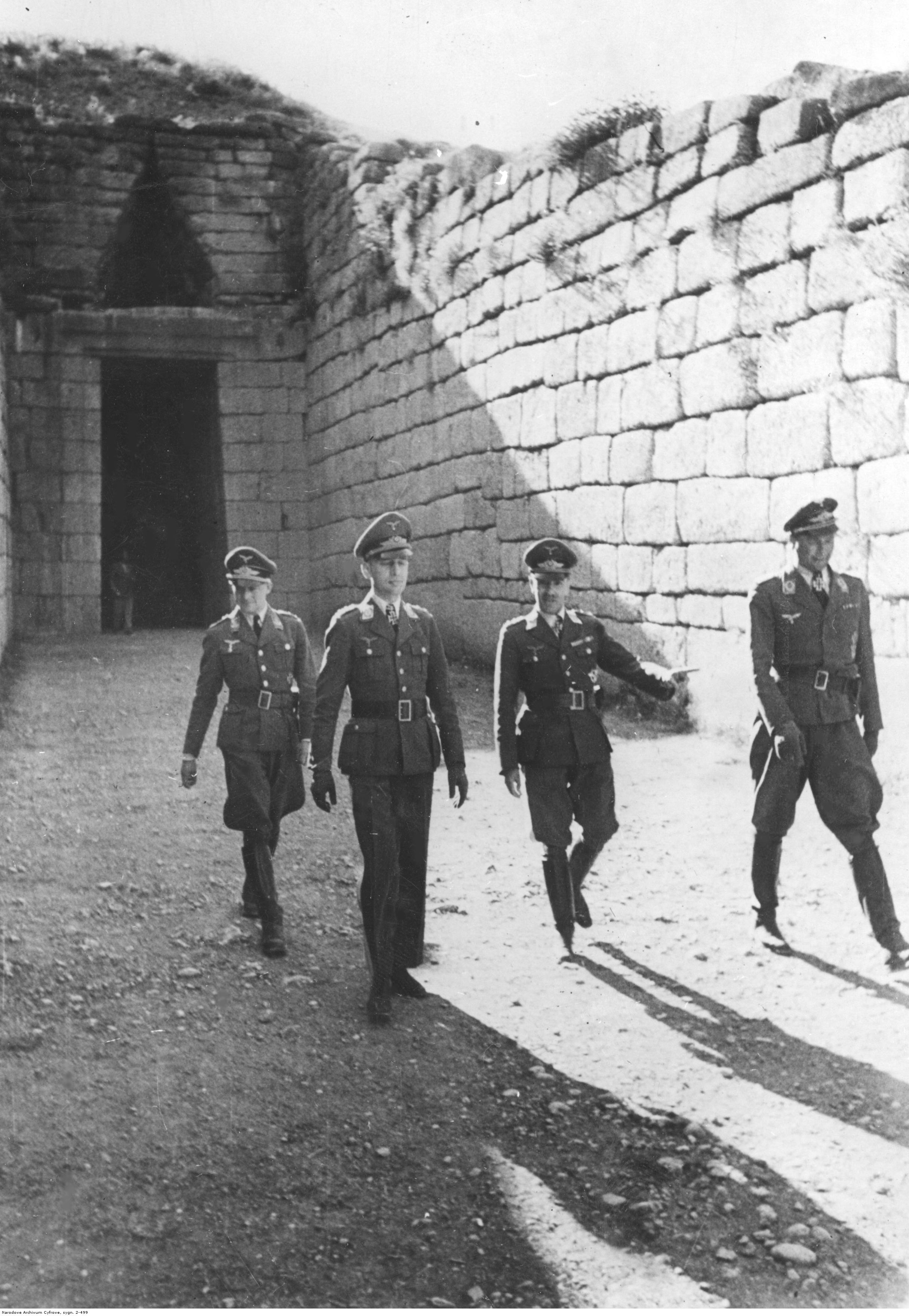
Löhr (2nd from right) and General Hans Jeschonnek (2nd from left) visiting ancient monuments in the Peloponnese, Greece, 1941

Löhr succeeded General der Pioniere Walter Kuntze as Commander-in-Chief of the 12th Army on 3 July 1942. He was appointed the Wehrmacht Commander in southeast Europe on 1 August 1942, and from 28 December 1942 this position was re-designated as Commander-in-chief in southeast Europe. The forces under his command were also designated as Army Group E, and he was appointed as its commander. In this role, Löhr controlled all subordinate commands in southeast Europe, including the commanding general in Serbia (Paul Bader), the military commander in the Salonika-Aegean area (Curt von Krenzki), the military commander in southern Greece, the commander of Crete, the naval commander in the Aegean Sea, the German plenipotentiary general in the Independent State of Croatia, the commanding general of German troops in Croatia, and the military attaché in Sofia, Bulgaria. Löhr was selected to command the German forces in the Balkans because he was an Austrian and thus was felt by Adolf Hitler to understand the region better as the Austrian empire had long included parts of the Balkans. Hitler had a marked preference for appointing his fellow Austrians to positions of power in the Balkans. The Balkans were considered by Hitler and the OKW to be of prime importance because it was the source of so many raw materials needed to sustain the German industrial economy such as oil from Romania and bauxite from Yugoslavia as well being the region where chrome from Turkey was transported across. The Ploesti oilfields in Romania were the Reich's main source of oil after Operation Barbarossa was launched on 22 June 1941 and Hitler was always very concerned about the prospect of the Allies using Greek airfields to bomb the Romanian oil fields. Germany had invaded and occupied Greece in April–May 1941 largely because of Hitler's obsessive fear that the British would bomb the Ploesti oilfields from Greece and thereby cripple the German war machine. Because of its economic importance to the Reich, Hitler was convinced that the Allies and the British in particular would attempt a return to the Balkans by landing in Greece, and the Balkan guerrillas could pose a threat to the lines of communication when the expected Allied landing in Greece occurred.

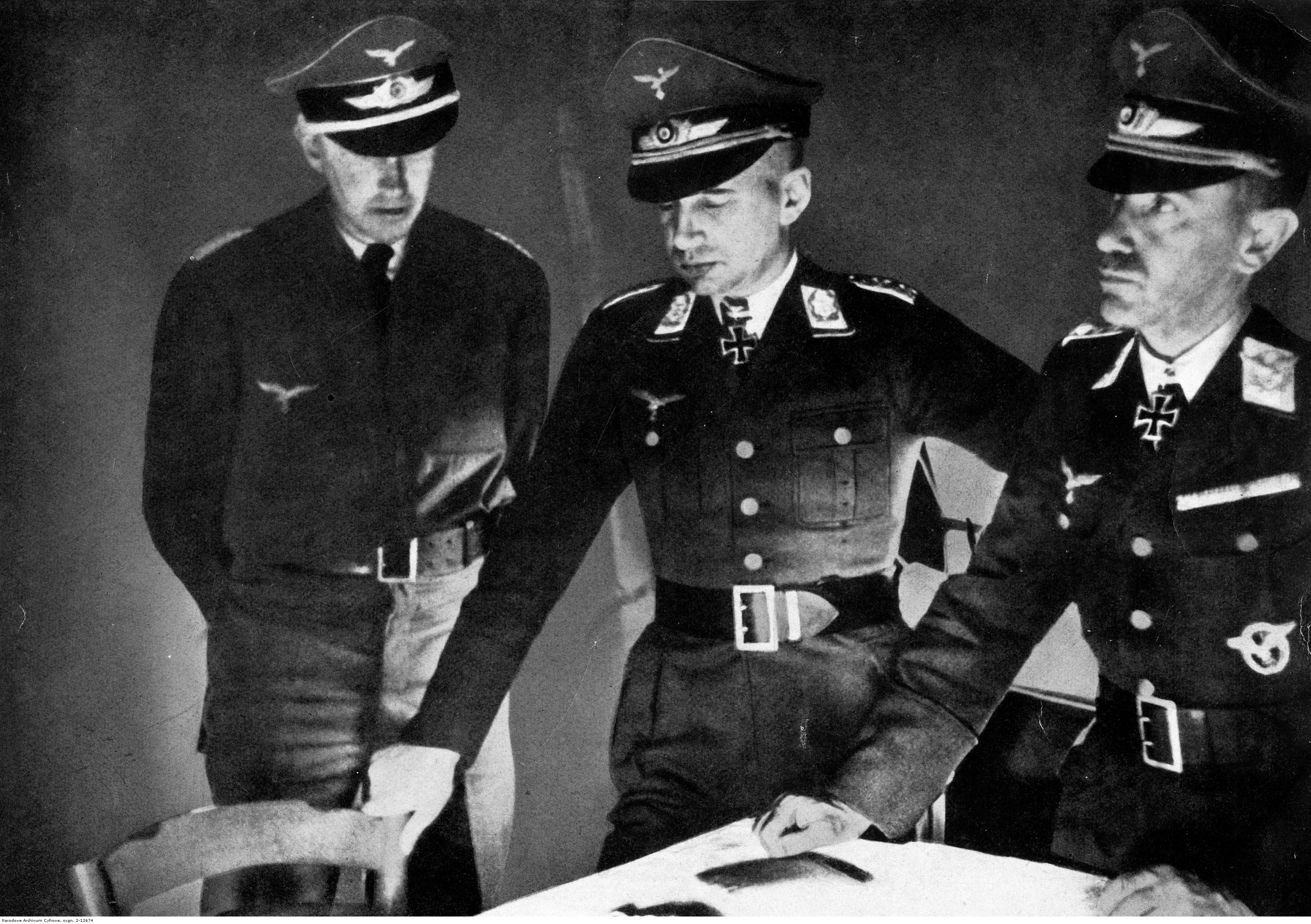
General Colonel Hans Jeschonnek (centre) and Löhr (right), March 1942

Löhr told Siegfried Kasche, the German ambassador in Zagreb, that Hitler appointed him to make the Balkans "quiet even if it was the quiet of the cemetery". Like many other Austrians, Löhr had much contempt for the "non-historic" peoples of the Balkans, especially the Serbs. Likewise, he regarded the NDH (Nezavisna Država Hrvatsk-Independent State of Croatia) as a something of joke, and despite its name he frequently disregarded the claims of the NDH to be a sovereign state. Löhr ignored warnings from Edmund Glaise-Horstenau that the way he rode roughshod over NDH officials was damaging support for the NDH amongst the Croats. On 29 August 1942, Löhr while visiting Belgrade met General Milan Nedić, the prime minister of the puppet Government of National Salvation in Serbia. Nedić told Löhr that contrary to the promises he received when he formed his government in August 1941 that the Government of National Salvation had almost no power. In particular, Nedić was exercised over the fact that his plans to merge the Serbian Volunteer Corps into the Serbian State Guard had been vetoed by both the Wehrmacht and the SS, which preferred to cap the strength of the Serb para-military forces assisting the occupation by keeping them divided. In common with many other German officials, Löhr did not trust Nedić because he was a Serb and Nedić's plans for a merged Serbian collaborating force came to naught.

In September 1942, Löhr made a tour of the Balkans and found the state of affairs much to his disliking. In Serbia, he reported that the SS, the Wehrmacht, the Auswärtige Amt, and the Four-Year Plan Organisation "operated alongside one another and sometimes against each other". He reported that the SS in Serbia operated as a law unto itself as the SS brooked "no interference from the Army's military police, but at least in Serbia there are no more Jews". Likewise, he stated that relations with the Italians who had occupied Dalmatia, Montenegro, part of Slovenia and much of Greece were difficult as the Regio Esercito had made a number of truces with the royalist Chetniks; that the relations between the Italians and the Ustaše were extremely bad on the account of the Italians having annexed Croat-majority Dalmatia; and finally he stated that the Italians were failing to play their part in the "Final Solution to the Jewish Question". Löhr favored a hard line against all guerrillas in Yugoslavia, regardless if they belonged to the Communist Partisans on the left or the royalist Chetniks on the right. The fact the Chetniks were collaborating with the Italians in their occupation zone by 1942 was the source of much disquiet for him, and he openly distrusted General Mario Roatta, the commander of the Italian 2nd Army, whom he considered to be far too soft on the Chetniks.

The territory of the NDH consisted much of modern Croatia along with all of Bosnia-Herzegovina and the NDH had 1,925,000 Serbs living within its territory (30% of the NDH's population). The policy of the violently anti-Serb Ustaše regime was to forcibly convert one-third of the Serbs to Roman Catholicism, expel one-third into Serbia and to kill the remaining one-third, through in practice the Ustaše policy often degenerated into genocide as Ustaše units sought to kill all of the Serbs living within their locality. German officials grumbled that it was absurd for the Ustaše to starkly alienate 30% of the NDH's population in such an extreme manner as it was noted that prečani Serbs were disproportionately overrepresented in the ranks of the Partisans. In September 1942, Löhr met with Hitler just before the Fūhrer was due to meet Ante Pavelić, the Poglavnik ("Leader") of the NDH. Löhr complained to Hitler that the Ustaše's anti-Serb policies had driven most of the NDH's Serb population into supporting the Partisans as the only military force capable of defending them from the Ustaše. He wanted Hitler to order Pavelić to stop the attacks on the prečani Serbs not on moral grounds, but as the best way to stop the Partisans from recruiting within the prečani Serb communities. Likewise, he did not criticise the anti-Semitic and anti-Romany policies of the Ustaše apparently out of the belief that Jews and Romany (Gypsies) were natural supporters of the Partisans. Löhr was especially critical of the Ustaše as an ally as he noted the Ustaše militia and the NDH Army were usually useless in combat as he stated "the Croatian troops are disintegrating" and "the Ustaša government itself is on the verge of chaos". He added that Wehrmacht officers in Yugoslavia disliked joint operations with the NDH forces owing to their poor discipline and unreliability in combat. Hitler laughingly dismissed Löhr's concerns, saying that the Ustaše was just "letting off a little steam" by trying to kill all of the Serbs living in the NDH, and ignored Löhr's suggestion that he discuss the issue at his meeting with Pavelić. At the Pavelić-Hitler meeting, the former denied that his anti-Serb policies had anything to do with increasing support for the Partisans and claimed the principle problem was a lack of arms. Pavelić claimed that if only Germany provided more arms, the Ustaše would wipe out the Partisans within a matter of weeks.

Germany had forced the NDH to sign a number of one-sided economic agreements in 1941 that turned over control of the Croat economy to the Reich. Hitler consistently took the line that he only cared about Pavelić following the economic agreements he had forced Pavelić to sign, and that he could not care less about what the NDH was trying to do to its Serb minority. Under the terms of the German-Croat treaty of 16 May 1941, Croatia had been turned into a German economic colony with the 'Reich' controlling all of the most important aspects of the NDH's economy in both the Italian and German occupation zones. The bauxite mines in Bosnia-Herzegovina where Germany obtained much of the bauxite it used to make aluminum (which in turn was used to make aircraft) were placed under German ownership in the German-Croat treaty, despite being located in the Italian zone, which was a constant source of Italo-German tension. A major opponent of Löhr was the Foreign Minister Joachim von Ribbentrop, who supported the NDH against the Wehrmacht as the only way of keeping the Auswärtige Amt involved in Yugoslavia, which led Ribbentrop to argue to Hitler that the NDH was "capable of life" and the Ustaše were a "state-creating movement". Ribbentrop maintained that there was no need for the Wehrmacht to assume operational control over NDH forces as Löhr wanted, and that relations between Berlin and Zagreb would be best conducted by the German embassy in Zagreb.

In a report to Hitler dated 1 October 1942 that was co-signed by Löhr, Kasche and Glaise-Horstenau the Italians were accused of protecting the Jews in their occupation zones in Yugoslavia and the complaints of the Ustaše against the Italians were endorsed. The report stated: "The implementation of the Jewish laws of the Croatian state are being hindered by Italian officials to such an extent that in the coastal zones, especially in Mostar, Dubrovnik and Crikvenica many Jews stand under Italian protection and many others are being helped over the border to Italian Dalmatia or Italy. Thus, the Jews gain help and continue their treasonous activities and especially those directed against our aims". Like all other Wehrmacht commanders, Löhr received Hitler's Commando Order of 18 October 1942 giving the standing orders to execute all commandos taken prisoner even in uniform. Acting on his own initiative, Löhr added in a clause to the Commando Order stating that all Partisans taken prisoner were to be summarily executed even if they were wearing uniforms as he wrote "all enemy groups are to be wiped out to the last man". He wrote that the war against the Partisans was to be fought with "brutal severity" and warned that he would be "pitiless" against any officer who did not follow the Commando Order as amended by him to the letter. On 31 October 1942, Löhr called a conference of all the senior German commanders in the Balkans, where he stated that "for the time being" Hitler was going to continue to back Pavelić and that the Wehrmacht would have to find a way to work around Pavelić. The solution he adopted was for Wehrmacht commanders to take operational control of NDH forces and for conscripting more Croats into Legionnaire units commanded by German officers.

On 18 December 1942, Löhr began planning Unternehmen Weiss ('Operation White'), a joint operation with the Italians intended to wipe out the main Partisan force based in the rugged mountains of Bosnia-Herzegovina. In a pincer movement, Löhr planned to have four German divisions along with associated Croat forces advance from the north to engage and destroy the Partisans in western Bosnia-Herzegovina while the three divisions of the Italian 2nd Army would advance from the south to inflict the coup de main to the surviving Partisans who escaped from his encirclement. Löhr described Undernehmen Weiss as "an experiment with several question marks", indicating his dissatisfaction with an offensive that had been imposed on him by Hitler. In a sign of the dysfunctional relations within the Axis, Roatta did not inform Löhr that his main strike force in the coming offensive would be the Chetniks from Montenegro as Roatta anticipated heavy losses and preferred that the Chetniks do the most dangerous work as a way to save Italian lives. Löhr's hand against Pavelić was greatly strengthened by Hitler's order on 28 December 1942 stating that he expected an Allied invasion of the Balkans sometime in the summer of 1943. As the prelude to resisting the expected landings, Löhr was ordered to crush all guerilla resistance in the Balkans in the winter and spring of 1943 in order to secure the lands of communication between the Reich and Greece. Löhr interpreted this order as permission to take over operational control of NDH forces over the opposition from the Auswärtige Amt and his Italian allies who felt that this was the end of Italian influence in the NDH.

By early 1943, the NDH forces had become little more than an auxiliary of the Wehrmacht with Pavelić being pushed aside from command of his own forces. Having German officers took command of the Ustaše led to a greater professionalism, but also exposed the NHD as a sham as Pavelić's "meek" request that the Croats serving in the Legionnaire units at least being permitted to wear their own uniforms was brusquely rejected by Löhr who stated that the Legionnaires were going to all wear German uniforms regardless of what Pavelić felt. Löhr complained that whenever German forces "pacified" an area by driving out the Partisans, the Ustaše were so incompetent that the Partisans immediately returned to the said area after German forces left to drive out the Ustaše, leading to a sense of monotonous futility as the same areas were "pacified" over and over again. In response, he urged greater German control of the NDH's police forces, and since policing in the Third Reich was the responsibility of the Reichsführer SS Heinrich Himmler, he was forced to seek Himmler's aid. In early February 1943, Löhr reported to Berlin that the NDH was a failure owing to the gross incompetence and corruption of the Ustaše regime, which had alienated most Croats from the NDH, and led to an upsurge in Croat support for the Partisans. He wrote: "Government and bureaucracy have lost all support through mismanagement and the Ustasha course, not only among the Pravoslavs [Serbs], but also among the Croat population". Following his complaints about the Ustaše, the SS in the spring of 1943 took control of the NDH's police forces as well starting to recruit a Waffen-SS division from the Bosnian Muslims to hunt down the Partisans.

Löhr organised the fourth and fifth offensives against Yugoslav Partisans in 1943, during which most of those taken prisoner, including the wounded, were murdered on the spot. On 20 January 1943, Löhr launched Weiss. The first part of the offensive saw some of the heaviest fighting yet seen in the Balkans as the Partisans put up a stiff resistance to the German-Croat forces as part of a rearguard action to facilitate their retreat and suffered heavy losses. As expected, the Partisans retreated south into the Italian zone of Bosnia-Herzegovina to avoid annihilation, but instead of being blocked by three Italian divisions as Löhr believed there would be, there was only one Italian division with the rest of Roatta's forces consisting of the Montenegrin Chetniks he had brought into Bosnia-Herzegovina. Löhr was furious with Roatta for using the Chetniks, all the more so as the Partisans proceeded to rout the Chetniks and break through out of the encirclement by smashing a Chetnik force upon the river Nervtva. Löhr complained bitterly in his reports to Berlin that his best chance to liquidate the Partisans had been ruined because of Italian "treachery" and "combinazioni". Benito Mussolini had promised Hitler several times that the Regio Esercito would act against the Chetniks, but the Germans failed to understand that the Regio Esercito generals owned their ultimate loyalty to King Victor Emmanuel III and were quite willing to disregard Mussolini's orders if they were felt to be not in the best interests of Italy. The primary interest of the king was always to keep his throne, which by early 1943 he felt could be best achieved by pulling Italy out of the losing war. The fact that the Chetniks had links to the British Special Operations Executive was paradoxically a source of attraction for the Regio Esercito generals who believed that the Chetnik leader Draža Mihailović could help arrange an armistice with the Allies.

At Löhr's urgent request, Roatta was sacked as the commander of the Italian 2nd Army in early February 1943, but his successor, General Mario Robotti, continued the precise same policy of using the Chetniks to do all the most dangerous work for the Italians in Bosnia-Herzegovina. At a stormy meeting in Belgrade on 8 February 1943, Robotti flatly refused Löhr's request to disarm the Chetniks, bring the other two divisions of the 2nd Army into Bosnia-Herzegovina, and permission to have German forces enter the Italian occupation zone in Bosnia-Herzegovina. One of Löhr's divisional commanders, General Lueters, wrote in a report to him that the Partisans were well organised; had much esprit de corps; were well commanded; and were very adroit in fighting at night, in the rain, in the fog and at close quarters, leading him to conclude the Partisans were "tough and fanatical fighters". Frustrated with the evasive replies that he received from his Italian allies, Löhr finally sent German divisions, most notably the bête noire of the Partisans, the 7th Waffen-SS Prinz Eugen division, into the Italian zone, but by the time he done so, the Partisans had defeated the Chetniks and crossed the Nervtva river, allowing them to escape to fight another day. However, Löhr believed that he inflicted such heavy losses as to cripple the Partisans forever. He was ordered by Hitler to follow Weiss with another operation, Schwarz ('Black'), intended to destroy the Chetniks, but instead hit the area of south-eastern Bosnia-Herzegovina and north-western Montenegro where the Partisans had retreated to following the battle upon the river Nervtva.

In early 1943, Löhr clashed a number of times with General Carlo Geloso, the commander of the Italian forces in Greece, over the policy to pursue towards Greek Jews. Löhr complained that in the Italian occupation zone in Greece that the anti-Semitic laws of Fascist Italy were being generally ignored. In his reports to Berlin Löhr accused Geloso of being "soft" on the Jews with Geloso being mocked as a weak man with too much compassion in his heart. Between March and July 1943, Löhr played a major role along with Alois Brunner, Max Merten and Dieter Wisliceny in arranging the deportation of the Jewish community in Thessaloniki-which was the largest Jewish community in the Balkans-to the Auschwitz death camp. The Jews of Thessaloniki numbered about 56, 000 people and made up about 25% of the Thessalonians in 1943. The deportations were a joint operation between the Fieldgendamerie of the Wehrmacht, the SS, and the Reichsbahn. The Jews of Thessaloniki were taken in 19 train convoys and almost the entire community was exterminated. The American historian Samuel Bowman described the extermination of the Jews of Thessaloniki as "a most efficient operation" with hardly any Jews escaping from the ghetto.

In the spring of 1943, the OKW was fooled by Operation Mincemeat, a British deception effort with the body of a dead homeless man being allowed to drift ashore in Spain dressed as a Royal Marine officer along with pseudo-plans for an invasion of Greece along with the claim that the up-coming invasion of Sicily was a feint to draw away German forces from Greece. In response to Operation Mincemeat, Löhr's command was reinforced in the spring with two first-rate divisions, the 1st Panzer Division and the 1st Mountain Division, being sent to Greece. In addition, the 11th Luftwaffe Field Division, the 117th Jaeger Division and the 104th Jaeger Division were also sent to Greece. Löhr's principle duty in the spring and summer of 1943 was preparing to resist the expected landing in Greece which continued even after the Allies landed in Sicily on 10 July 1943. The Balkans were more important to the Reich economically than Italy, and Hitler could not believe that the Allies would choose to make their main effort in the Mediterranean theater in Italy instead of Greece. On 25 July 1943, King Victor Emmanuel III sacked Mussolini as prime minister and appointed General Pietro Badoglio as the new Italian prime minister with secret instructions to sign an armistice with the Allies. Hitler strongly suspected that the new Badoglio government was negotiating an armistice with the Allies and gave orders to his generals for Operation Achse, a plan to occupy Italy along with the Italian occupation zones in France and in the Balkans. As commander of Army Group E, Löhr was in charge of the Balkan aspects of Operation Achse.

In September 1943 following the Armistice of Cassibile which ended Italy's war against the Allies, Löhr organised the German take-over of the Italian occupation zones in the Balkans. Löhr made no compromises as he insisted that the Regio Esercito units in the Balkans either surrender to the Germans or fight under Wehrmacht command as part of Army Group E, and failing the acceptance of the first two terms, he would use force against the Italians. Löhr simply ignored Italian objections that this policy violated international law as Germany and Italy were not at war as he argued the armistice of Cassibile endangered the German position in the Balkans. Most of the Italian troops on the mainland of Greece surrendered out of the impression that they would be returned to Italy; instead Löhr shipped them all north to POW camps in Germany. Several of the Italian garrisons on the Greek islands resisted the German attempt to disarm them, leading to a number of massacres of the Italian troops once the Germans had won control of the islands. The armistice of Cassibile had removed Italy as a power in the Balkans, creating a vacuum that Löhr struggled to fill as Hitler was unwilling to provide extra troops. Until the armistice, Löhr was opposed to working with the Chetniks, whom he considered to be little better than the Partisans. After the armistice, the need to occupy the former Italian zones in Yugoslavia without any reinforcements from Germany led Löhr to agree to work with the Chetniks against the Partisans, an arrangement that he called "a necessary evil". Draža Mihailović, the leader of the Chetniks, had often stated that his enemies were in this order the Partisans, the Ustaše and the Bosnian Muslims with the Italians and the Germans being the very last on his enemies' list. For Mihailović and the other Chetnik leaders the defence of the Serb social order against a Communist revolution took precedence over resisting the German occupation, and he had long wanted an arrangement with the Germans, who had not been particularly interested prior to the armistice of Cassibile.

In the aftermath of Operation Achse, Löhr launched a sustained drive to wipe out the andartes in Greece, especially ELAS (Ellinikós Laïkós Apeleftherotikós Stratós-Greek People's Liberation Army), the largest of the Greek resistance groups. The British historian Mark Mazower wrote about Löhr's campaigns in Greece: "He had travelled widely and was certainly not a slavish admirer of the Fūhrer. None of this prevented him from following the strict and ultimately self-defeating guidelines for anti-guerrilla warfare which the German military had evolved under the influence of National Socialism. Most of Löhr's troops came into Greece from the brutal environment of the Eastern Front and Yugoslavia". Mazower described him as a "short, dapper, taciturn" man who had a deep interest in the Balkans, which he had travelled extensively in from the early 20th century onward.

Löhr saw the Balkans through an Austrian imperialistic spectrum that was little changed from the views he had held in the First World War, regarding all of the Balkan peoples as "savages" in need of German guidance. Like most other Wehrmacht officers, Löhr saw any and all resistance as the work of "Balkan fanatics" unable to appreciate as he saw it Germany's civilising mission in the Balkans. Besides for his views about violent "Balkan fanatics", Löhr and the officers who served under him were very much influenced by the Nazi views about "Judeo-Bolshevism" as he saw Communism as a demonic ideology which posed an existential threat to Western civilization. The fact that the two principle resistance movements he was fighting in the Balkans, namely the Partisans in Yugoslavia and EAM in Greece, were both Communist movements led him to see the war in the Balkans as an extension of the Eastern Front. Alongside Hermann Neubacher of the Auswärtige Amt, Löhr governed Greece.

From the fall of 1943 onwards, both Neubacher and Löhr privately believed that the war was lost for Germany in a military sense, and the duo held out hope that the Reich could only win the war in a political sense. Both Neubacher and Löhr believed that the only possible way that Germany could win would be if the United States and the United Kingdom were to switch sides and join forces with the Reich against the Soviet Union. The fact that the main resistance group was EAM and that a number of the Greek royalist collaborators had ties to the Greek government-in-exile was seen by Löhr and Neubacher as a potential opening for forming an Anglo-American-German alliance. Over the protests of the SS, Löhr and Neubacher tolerated the Greek royalist collaborators exchanging messages with the government-in-exile. Neubacher and Löhr came into conflict with Jürgen Stroop, the Higher SS Police Chief of Greece, who asserted a claim for the SS to run anti-guerrilla operations under his command in defiance of Hitler's orders that Löhr was in charge of all anti-guerrilla operations in Greece. On October 4, 1943, Stroop was recalled to the Reich as Löhr and Neubacher had more powerful friends in Berlin than Stroop. During one of his campaigns to destroy the andartes, Löhr sent a message to the commander of the 1st Panzer Division that he wanted the "most severe measures against any signs of hostility" and warned that any officers who showed any "softness" towards the Greeks would face a court-martial. In another order, Löhr stated about the war against the andartes that "this is a fight to the death without any half-way house" and that any "ideas of a 'peace-loving people's heroism' are misguided. Precious German blood is at stake". As Commander-in-Chief of Army Group E, Löhr oversaw the Dodecanese campaign. On 26 August 1944, with the Allies driving on Germany on three fronts, Hitler ordered Löhr to begin evacuating Army Group E from Greece and move north to defend the Fatherland.

At the end of the war in Europe, Löhr received orders for unconditional surrender, but instead directed his forces to break out towards Austria. According to the historian Jozo Tomasevich, Löhr was captured by the 14th Slovene Division of Yugoslav Partisans in Slovenia on 9 May 1945, and attempted to negotiate passage for his troops to Austria. This was refused and Löhr was prevailed upon to issue orders to cease fighting, which the troops nonetheless disobeyed. He escaped, countermanded his order to surrender and continued with the breakout attempt. After an intense manhunt, Löhr was recaptured on 13 May.

== Conviction and execution ==
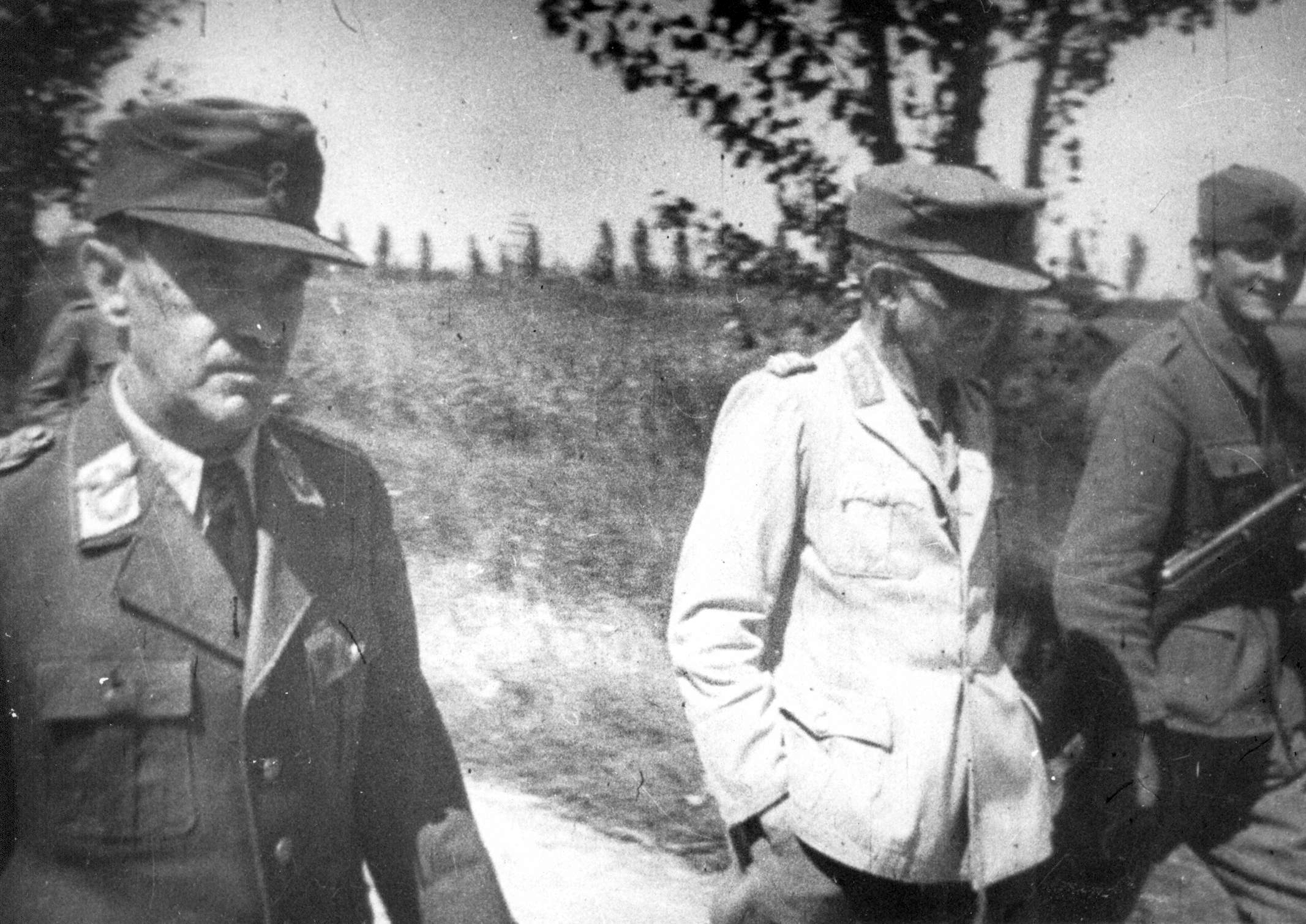
The capture of Löhr

Löhr was imprisoned by Yugoslavia from 15 May 1945 to 26 February 1947. He was tried and convicted for war crimes committed during the anti-partisan operations of 1943, including the killing of hostages and burning of villages, and disregarding Germany's unconditional surrender. On 16 February 1947, the court sentenced the accused based on Article 3, Item 3 of the Act on Crimes Against the Nation and the State, to death by firing squad, and co-defendants Generalleutnants Josef Kübler, Fritz Neidholdt and Johann Fortner, Generalmajor Adalbert Lontschar, Oberst Günther Tribukait and SS-Brigadeführer August Schmidhuber to death by hanging.

== Commemoration ==
In 1955, members of Vienna Aero Club installed a memorial plaque dedicated to Löhr was installed in the Vienna Stiftskirche on Mariahilfer Straße, which belongs to the Military Ordinariate. The inscription read: "for the unforgotten comrade Colonel General Alexander Löhr". The Ordinariate said: "The memorial plaques [...] in no way serve to glorify war crimes." After some protests, the plaque was removed in 1986 during the Waldheim affair, but reappeared again some years later. It was finally removed in 2015.

Military offices
Preceded by none	Commander of Luftwaffenkommando Österreich; 1 July 1938 – 18 March 1939	Succeeded by redesignated Luftflotte 4
Preceded by none	Commander of Luftflotte 4; 18 March 1939 – 20 July 1942	Succeeded by Generalfeldmarschall Wolfram Freiherr von Richthofen
Preceded by General der Pioniere Walter Kuntze	Commander of 12th Army; 3 July 1942 – December 1942	Succeeded by General der Panzertruppe Walther Wenck
Preceded by none	Commander of Army Group E 31 December 1942 – 8 May 1945	Succeeded by none
