= Operation Schwarz =

Battle during World War II

Coordinates: 43°20′46″N 18°41′16″E

- Part of World War II in Yugoslavia
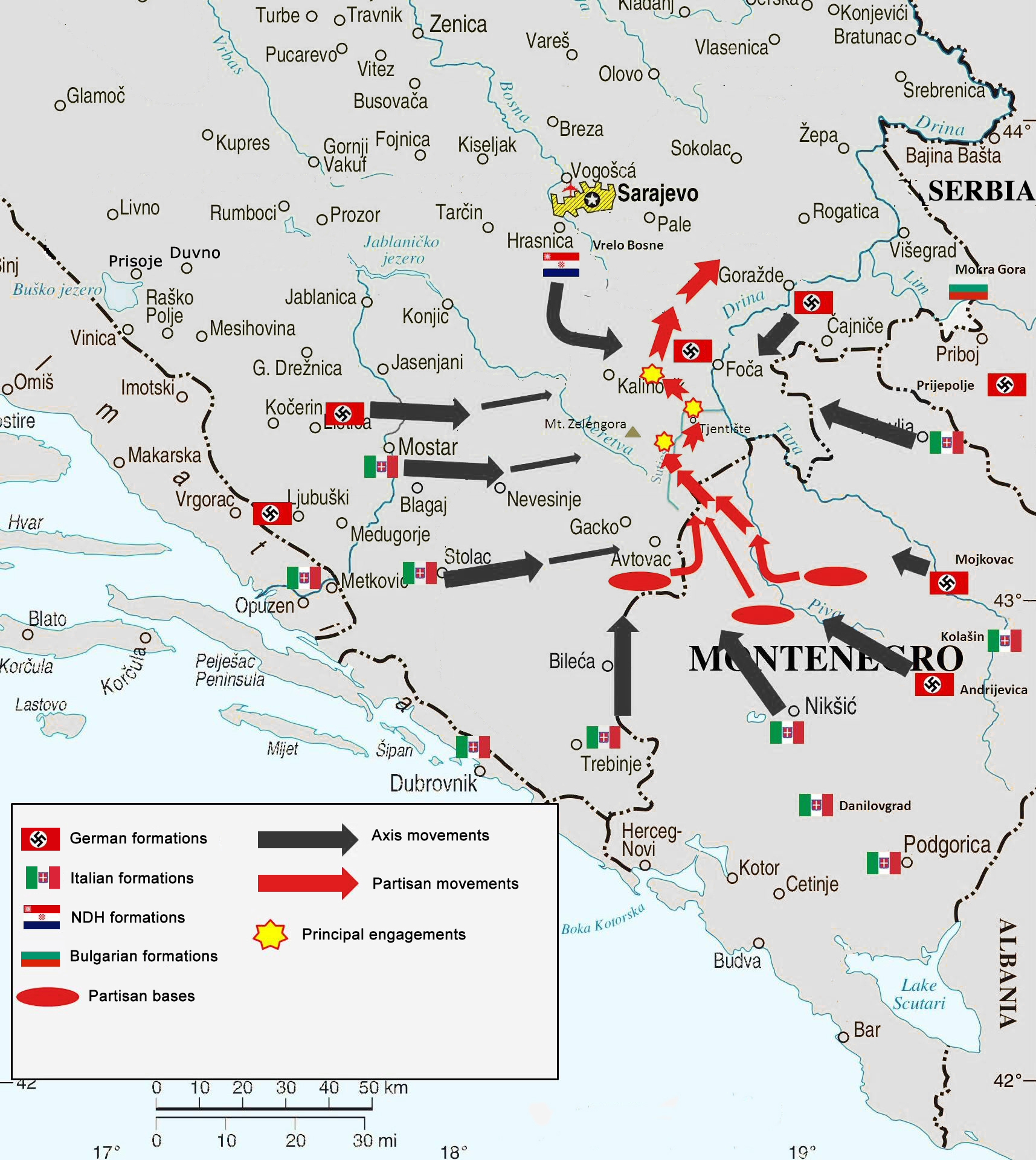
- Map of the operation, superimposed on modern-day borders
Date	15 May – 16 June 1943
Location	Northwestern Montenegro and southeastern Bosnia and Herzegovina, occupied Yugoslavia
Result	Inconclusive

Belligerents
Axis: Italy; Germany; Croatia; Bulgaria	Yugoslav Partisans

Commanders and leaders
(Nazi Germany) Alexander Löhr (Nazi Germany) Rudolf Lüters	(Yugoslav Partisans) Josip Broz Tito (WIA) (Yugoslav Partisans) Velimir Terzić (Yugoslav Partisans) Koča Popović (Yugoslav Partisans) Peko Dapčević (Yugoslav Partisans) Vlado Šegrt (Yugoslav Partisans) Pavle Jakšić (Yugoslav Partisans) Radovan Vukanović (Yugoslav Partisans) Sava Kovačević †

Strength
127,000 men 300+ aircraft	Around 22,148 men

Casualties and losses
(Nazi Germany) 583 killed, 1,760 wounded, 425 missing (Fascist Italy) 290 killed, 541 wounded, 1,502 missing (Independent State of Croatia) 40 killed, 166 wounded, 205 missing Total casualties: 913 killed, 2,467 wounded, 2,132 missing	1/3 killed and wounded (6,391–7,543 killed and wounded)
- 2,537 pro-Partisan civilian sympathizers executed

Operation Schwarz (German: Unternehmen Schwarz), also known as the Fifth Enemy Offensive (Serbo-Croatian Latin: Peta neprijateljska ofanziva) in Yugoslav historiography and often identified with its final phase, the Battle of the Sutjeska (Serbo-Croatian Latin: Bitka na Sutjesci pronounced [bîtka na sûtjɛst͡si]) was a joint attack by the Axis. Taking place from 15 May to 16 June 1943, it aimed to destroy the main Yugoslav Partisan force, near the Sutjeska River in south-eastern Bosnia. The failure of the offensive marked a turning point for Yugoslavia during World War II. It was also the last big German–Italian joint operation against the partisans.

The operation immediately followed Operation Weiss, which had failed to accomplish the same objectives, to eliminate the central Partisan formations and capture their commander, Josip Broz Tito.

== Background ==
During the previous operation Weiss, Chetniks fought against Partisans under Italian command. However, even during the operation, negotiations were held between the German and Italian leaders on the disarmament of the Chetniks. Because of Allied deception, German Wehrmacht deeply believed that the Allies would invade the Balkans instead Sicily after victory in the North African campaign. In operations Weiss I and Weiss II, the Wehrmacht did not achieve their desired goals of destroying the Yugoslav partisans and establishing control over the region, so preparations began for a new venture.

With operation Schwarz, the Wehrmacht intended to clear the background of the Adriatic coast by destroying both the Chetnik and Partisan movements, which were still firmly established in Herzegovina and Montenegro. Hitler calculated that, in the event of a British invasion of the Balkans, Chetniks under Italian care would switch sides and join the Allies.

However, in the first phase, there were tensions and misunderstandings between the German and Italian armies on that issue. Since the Italian commanders in Yugoslavia were very reluctant to disarm the Chetniks, Hitler won the consent through Mussolini government and the Italian Supreme Command. General Mario Robotti was fiercely against the disarmament of the Chetniks, at least until the partisans were destroyed. This attitude was shared by Chief of Staff of the Italian Army, general Vittorio Ambrosio, but he had to obey the promise that Mussolini gave to Hitler. At the beginning of March 1943, general Ambrosio, summoned Robotti and Alessandro Pirzio Biroli to Rome for talks on the disarmament of Chetniks and operations against partisans.

=== Axis plans ===
The Axis rallied 127,000 land troops for the offensive, including German, Italian, Croatian, Bulgarian, and over 300 aeroplanes.

For this operation, the Commander of the Southeast, colonel-general Alexander Löhr, received elite 1st Mountain Division from the Eastern Front as reinforcements. Löhr entrusted the tactical command to the German troop commander in Croatia, Rudolf Lüters. The combat group for this operation was therefore called the Croatian Corps.

The German command adjusted the operational plan of action against the Partisans to the characteristics of the terrain. They planned to concentrate the main partisan divisions and their Supreme Headquarters on the naturally isolated and almost uninhabited area between the Tara and Piva canyons, and the Durmitor mountain, and to destroy it there with the mass use of aviation, artillery and mountain troops. The 1st Mountain Division with its northern wing, the Italian 19th Infantry (Mountain) Division Venezia, the battle group Ludwiger (724th German, 61st and 63rd Bulgarian Regiments), the 369th Infantry Division, the 118th Jäger Division with the 4th Home Guard Jäger Brigade of the Independent State of Croatia were deployed in a semicircle on the east and north sides. In the first phase, these forces were supposed to take control of Sandžak and push Partisan forces to the left side of the River Tara. The southern wing of the 1st Alpine Division Taurinense, 23rd Infantry Division Ferrara and the 7th SS Mountain Division Prinz Eugen were supposed to push Partisans from the south and southeast. After that, the 118th Jäger Division had the task of occupying the left bank of the Piva and thus closing the environment, so that the breakthrough was hindered not only by strong forces but also by deep river gorges. This would bring Partisan forces to a dead end and destroy them.

In addition to these forces, there were additional 4 Italian divisions deployed in Adriatic hinterland, from the Albanian border to the lower course of the Neretva: were these Italian divisions: 155th Infantry Division Emilia in the Bay of Kotor, 151st Infantry Division Perugia in area of Vilusi, Bileća and Trebinje, 154th Infantry Division Murge around Dubrovnik and 32nd Infantry Division Marche in downstream of the Neretva, from Mostar to Metković.

=== Partisans' activities prior to Axis offensive ===
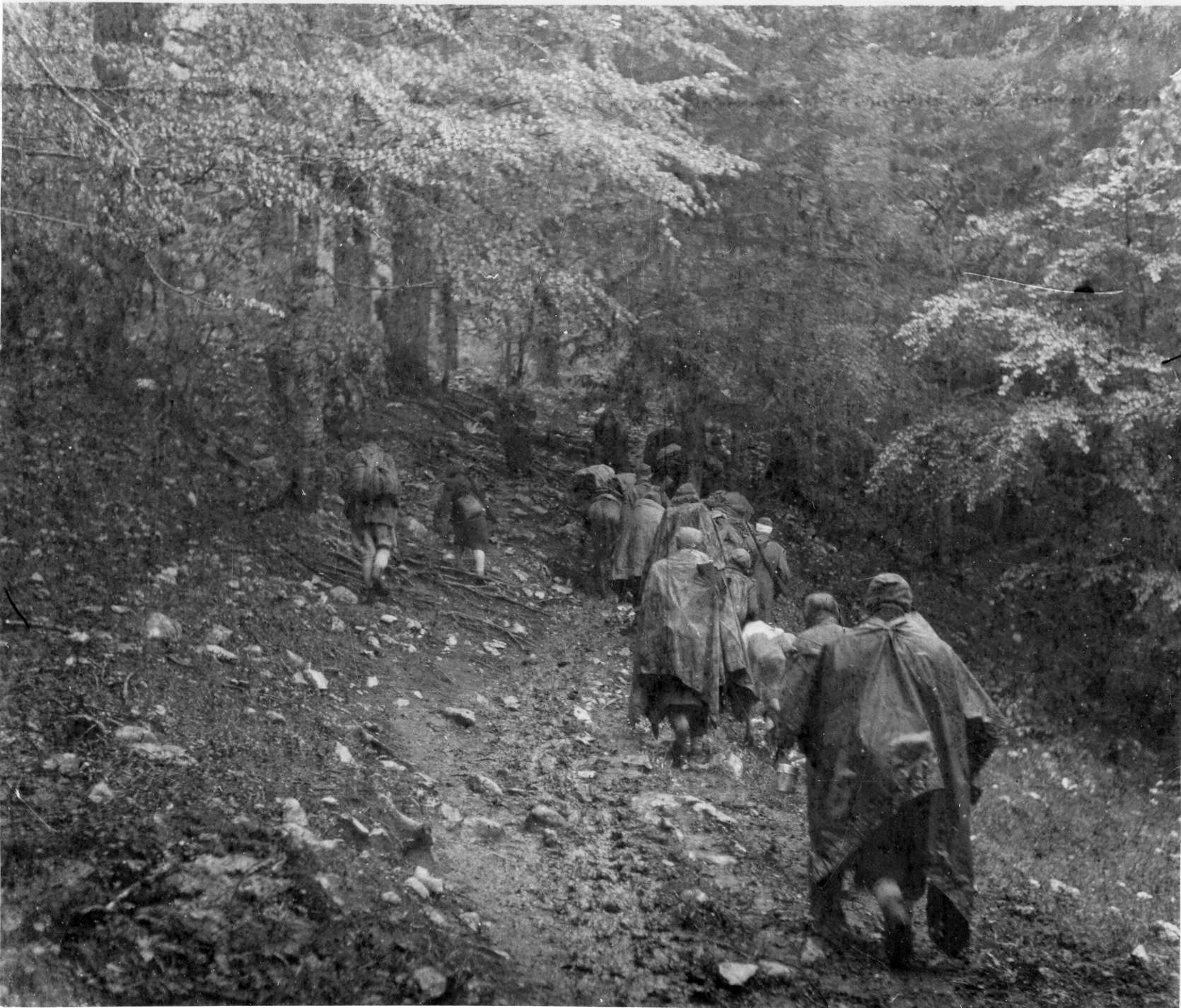
Partisan column during the Battle of the Sutjeska

While the Axis were preparing for Operation Schwarz, fierce battles were fought on the territory of Herzegovina and Montenegro. After operation Weiss, the operative group of Partisan divisions set out with all its might through Herzegovina to break into Montenegro, destroying the Chetniks and Italians units on its path, and taking control over the area. In that area, the exhausted fighters would rest, the wounded would be treated, and then they would move towards Kosovo and southern Serbia.

Fierce battles between partisans and Italian-Chetnik forces were fought in the sector Foča-Kalinovik-Gacko-Šavnik. Nevesinje passed from hand to hand as many as eight times. On April 6, Partisan forces forced the Drina, defeated parts of the Taurinense division and the Chetniks near Ifsar, captured Čajniče and besieged Foča, where an Italian battalion and about 1,000 Chetniks were surrounded. Chasing the Chetniks deeper and deeper into Montenegro, the Supreme Headquarters moved to Mount Durmitor.

After the heavy defeat inflicted on the Italians in Pivka Javorka, on 1 May, the First and Second Proletarian Divisions embarked on a comprehensive offensive to liquidate the Italian-Chetnik garrison in Kolašin, with the intention of continuing the advance towards Berane. As part of the siege of Kolašin, a strike group of battalions (two battalions of the Fourth and one battalion of the Fifth Montenegrin Brigade) defeated the Italian regiment near Bioč on 15 May.

At the beginning of operation Schwarz, the Yugoslav National Liberation Army had 22,148 soldiers in 16 brigades. There were 8,925 Partisans from Croatia (5,195 of those from Dalmatia), 8,293 from Bosnia and Herzegovina, 1,492 from Serbia (including Vojvodina and Kosovo) and 3,337 from Montenegro. By ethnicity, 11,851 were Serbs, 5,220 Croats, 3,295 Montenegrins and 866 Muslims.

Partisan units were bringing with them a central hospital with about 3,000 wounded. In addition, YNLA troops suffered from severe lack of food and medical supplies, and many were struck down by typhoid.

== Operation ==
=== Axis preparations ===
Wehrmacht forces were advancing towards Montenegro from the north and from the east. Partisan forces were keeping parts of the Italian Alpine Division "Taurinense" and about 1,100 Chetniks under blockade in Foča since 15 April. In early May, parts of the German 369th Legionary Division penetrated as far as Foča, suppressing the Sixth East Bosnian and Fifteenth Majevica Brigades, liberating the Aosta battalion of the Italian Taurinense division and about 1,000 Chetniks, who had been under siege by Partisan forces for 23 days. The Chetniks were disarmed and released.

The left wing of the 369th Legionary Division advanced from the direction of Priboj towards Pljevlja, and, without encountering any resistance, merged with the main body of the "Taurinense" division.

=== Disarmament of Chetniks ===
During the advance of the 7th SS Mountain Division and the 118th Jäger Division through eastern Herzegovina, German forces encountered a certain degree of Italian obstruction and skirmishes with the Chetniks. Hundreds of Chetniks were disarmed.

At the beginning of May, Pavle Đurišić established contacts with parts of the 1st Mountain Division and the 4th Brandenburg Regiment. The Germans decided to conceal their real intentions, so they let the first group of disarmed Chetniks go home. By accepting communication with the Chetniks, by mid-May 1943 they managed to concentrate a large number of Chetniks, led by Đurišić, around the town of Kolašin, where German combat units were already deployed. In a surprise raid on the morning of 14 May, despite the established contacts and strong opposition of the commander of the Italian 14th Corps, General Ercole Roncaglia, the Germans captured the Chetniks in their sleep and disarmed them. German forces on the ground appealed to the higher command to reconsider the decision to arrest the Chetniks, because they proved to be reliable allies against the partisans, but the German command did not give up on the original idea. One part of captured Chetniks, including Đurišić, was to be interned in prison camps in Greece and Poland, and the rest for labour battalionss in the upcoming fight against the Partisans. In the meantime, Mihailović left the village of Gornje Lipovo and headed for Serbia. After capturing the majority of Montenegrin Chetniks near Kolašin, the Germans continued with operation Schwarz.

=== Phase I: Initial battles (15–20 May) ===
After a period of troop concentration, the offensive started on 15 May 1943. The Axis troops used the advantage of better starting positions to encircle and isolate the partisans on the Durmitor mountain area, located between the Tara and Piva rivers in the mountainous areas of northern Montenegro and forced them to engage in a fierce month-long battle on waste territory.

The first clashes after Operation Schwarz commenced took place in the north, between Čajniče and Foča, with parts of the 369th Legionary Division, and in the east, near Brodarevo and Mojkovac, with the 1st Mountain Division.

=== Phase II: Breakthrough attempt toward eastern Bosnia (21–27 May) ===
Faced with the advance of large German forces from the east, the Supreme Headquarters decided to prevent the closure of the ring by capturing Foča and providing communication with eastern Bosnia. The attack was carried out from 21 May to 25 by the reinforced 1st Proletarian Division against the majority of the German 118th Jäger Division and the 4th Home Guard Jäger Brigade of the Independent State of Croatia. Despite certain tactical successes (breaking up of the 7th Mountain Regiment on 21 May and the 13th Mountain Regiment on 24 May), after a flanking attack by parts of the 369th Division near Gradac on 25 May, this attack proved hopeless. From there, on 27 May, the Supreme Headquarters ordered the transfer of all forces to the left bank of the Tara.

The 118th Jäger Division had the task of breaking out on Piva from the west and blocking it. On 22 May, her 738th Regiment, without contact with Partisan units, broke out on Vučevo, a plateau west of Piva. However, they could not organize communications and supplies in this wide and impassable area, so the regiment commander, lieutenant colonel Anacker, sent one battalion to the south to establish a connection with the 7th SS Division, and one to the west, to connect with the headquarters of his division. The remaining, 2nd Battalion, in a battle on 29 May, was repelled from dominant positions by the two battalions of the 2nd Proletarian Brigade. The intervention of parts of the division from the north, across the Drina, was suppressed by the forces of the 1st Proletarian Division, which moved across the Tara. Thus, the Partisan forces firmly occupied Vučevo and prevented the Germans from closing the ring on Piva. The next natural obstacle on which the 118th Division could do that was the valley of the river Sutjeska.

On 18 May, the 7th SS Division and the Italian Division Ferrara began to appear from the south towards Šavnik, Žabljak and Mratinje. The successful defence of the First Dalmatian and the Fifth Montenegrin Brigades, which suppressed the appearance of the right wing of the 7th SS Division and the Italians, enabled the organization of an attack on the left wing of the 7th SS Division.

=== Phase III: Arrival of British mission (27 May – 3 June) ===
Informed on 20 May 1943 of the arrival of the British military mission, the Supreme Headquarters left Đurđevića Tara and settled in the forest near Black Lake, at the foot of Durmitor.

On the night of 27/28 May, the British Liaison Department arrived. At the head of this mission were Captain William F. Stewart, who worked at the British Consulate in Zagreb before the war spoke Serbo-Croatian, and William Deakin, a history professor at Oxford. In addition to the two of them, the mission had 4 more members.

The very next day, Tito received the British. He demanded military assistance and that the British Air Force bomb German concentration centres.

From 31 May until 5 June, the 4th Montenegrin, 7th Krajina and 10th Herzegovinian brigades fought fierce and exhausting battles with the Germans on the rugged sides of the mountain Bioč and in the upper course of the Piva. The successes achieved were insufficient, given the reserves available to the Germans.

=== Phase IV: Supreme Headquarters in encirclement (4 June – 9 June) ===
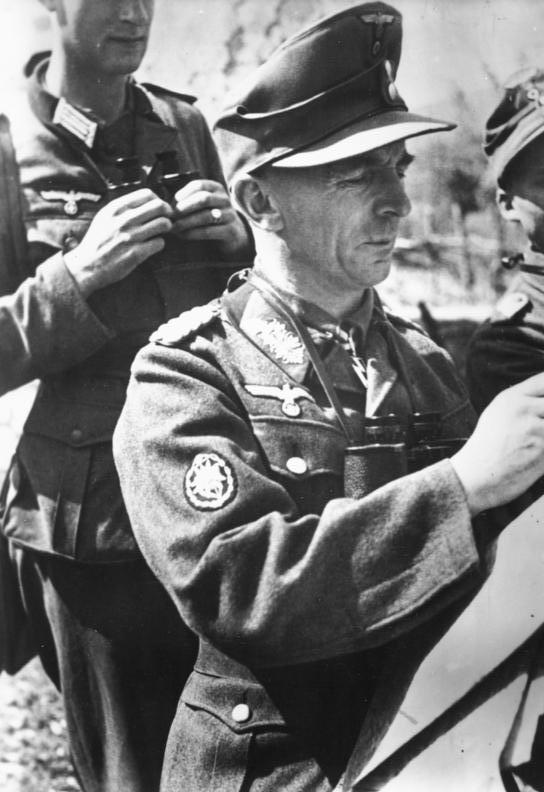
Walter Stettner, commander of 1st Mountain Division during the battle

As the attempt to break through the front via Foča failed, the Supreme Headquarters had to return to its initial positions, which the Germans used to make an even stronger ring. In addition to the daily fighting, the Sutjeska canyon was bombarded by planes every day, at a very low altitude. On 3 June, Tito crossed the Piva near Mratinje with the Supreme Headquarters. Thus, in the first days of June, the entire Supreme Headquarters found itself encircled, together with the central hospital in the Sutjeska valley.

On the same day, at the session of the Supreme Staff, the position of the Partisan groups with the hospital was discussed, and it was concluded that the situation was critical. The Supreme Headquarters saw that the main operational group could only break toward the west, through the Sutjeska valley, because there were weaker German forces there. However, the Germans foresaw this development, so they hurried to fortify the entire Sutjeska valley. Having established that this direction, through the source part of Sutjeska and Gatačko Polje, was densely occupied in depth, the Supreme Headquarters decided to divide the Partisan forces into two parts. The first group consisted of the 1st and 2nd Divisions, which had already forced Piva, with the Supreme Headquarters, and the second of the 3rd (in a slightly changed composition) and the 7th Division, with the Central Hospital and part of the councillors of AVNOJ, located east of Piva. The second group was led by Milovan Đilas, as a delegate of the Supreme Headquarters, and Sava Kovačević, who was appointed commander of the 3rd Division. The two groups were to break through in divergent directions in order to stretch the German forces. The first group was to break through Sutjeska to the northwest, while the second was given the task of returning to the right bank of the Tara, toward Sandžak.

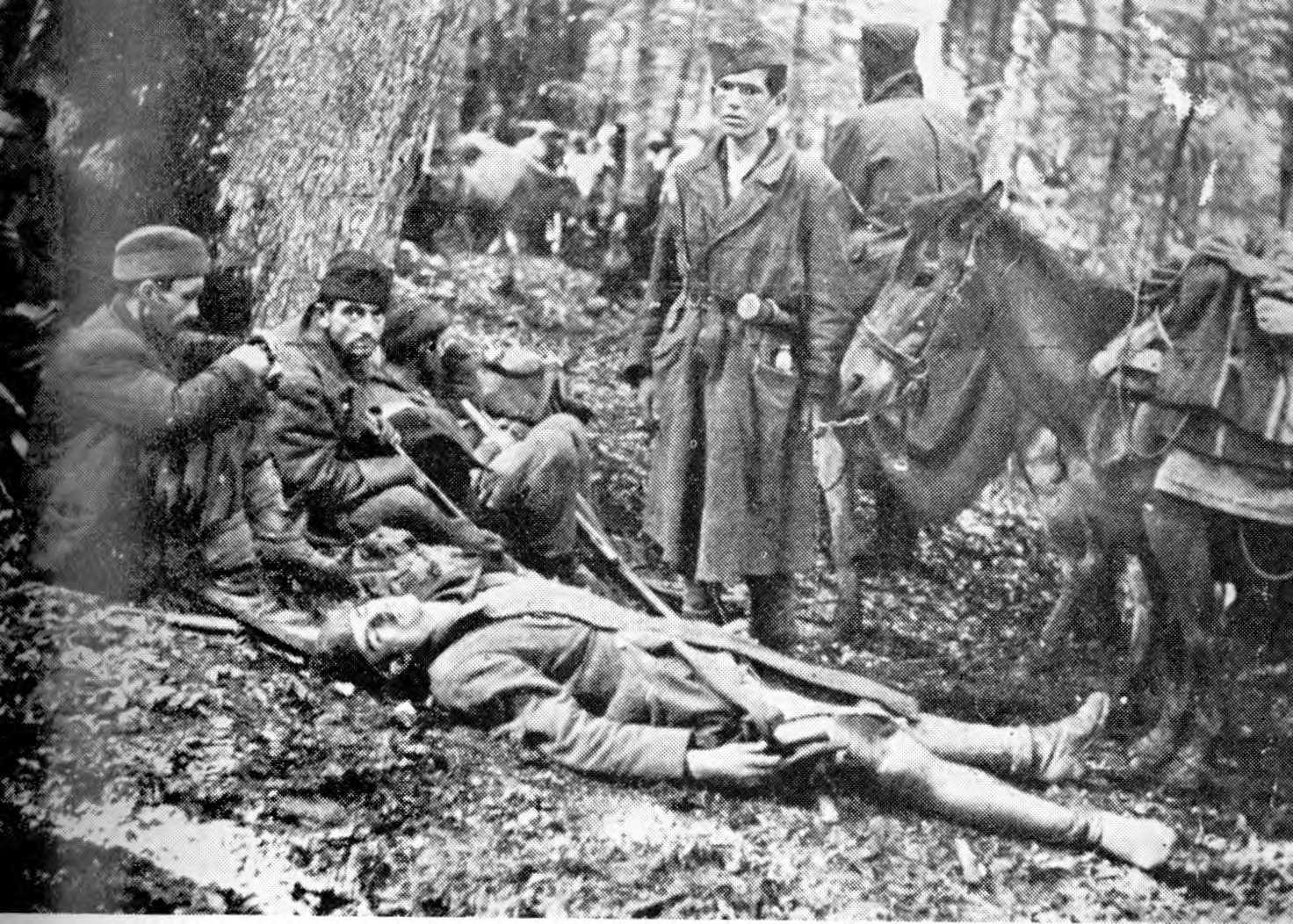
Soldiers of 2nd Dalmatian Brigade rest on Milinklade on 9 June 1943. Author: George Skrigin

The First Proletarian Division was sent to attack the valley of Sutjeska via Piva and Vučevo. As a dominant point, it was necessary to take the hill at Vučevo, to make a corridor for the free passage over Sutjeska, in the direction of Zelengora and further to Bosnia. The German command also foresaw such a possibility, so it sent an advance force to take Vučevo. In a hand-to-hand battle, the forces of the 1st Proletarian Division managed to overcome the Germans and take control of this dominant point. The Germans then began to occupy the entire valley of the Sutjeska, from Tjentište to its confluence with the Drina near Čelebić. The 7th SS Division Prince Eugene penetrated in that direction, which surrounded the majority of forces and the central hospital.

In the area around the canyons of Sutjeska and Suha, fierce battles began for the surrounding heights, which alternately fell into the hands of both. An area of 5–6 km was made for the passage of the majority of forces. The wounded were supposed to go there as well.

The First Proletarian Division marched through Milinklade and on 8 June 1943, broke out on Zelengora. The Second Proletarian Division was less fortunate. At the place of Bare, not far from Volujak, there was a scene of bloody battles with units of the 118th German Division.

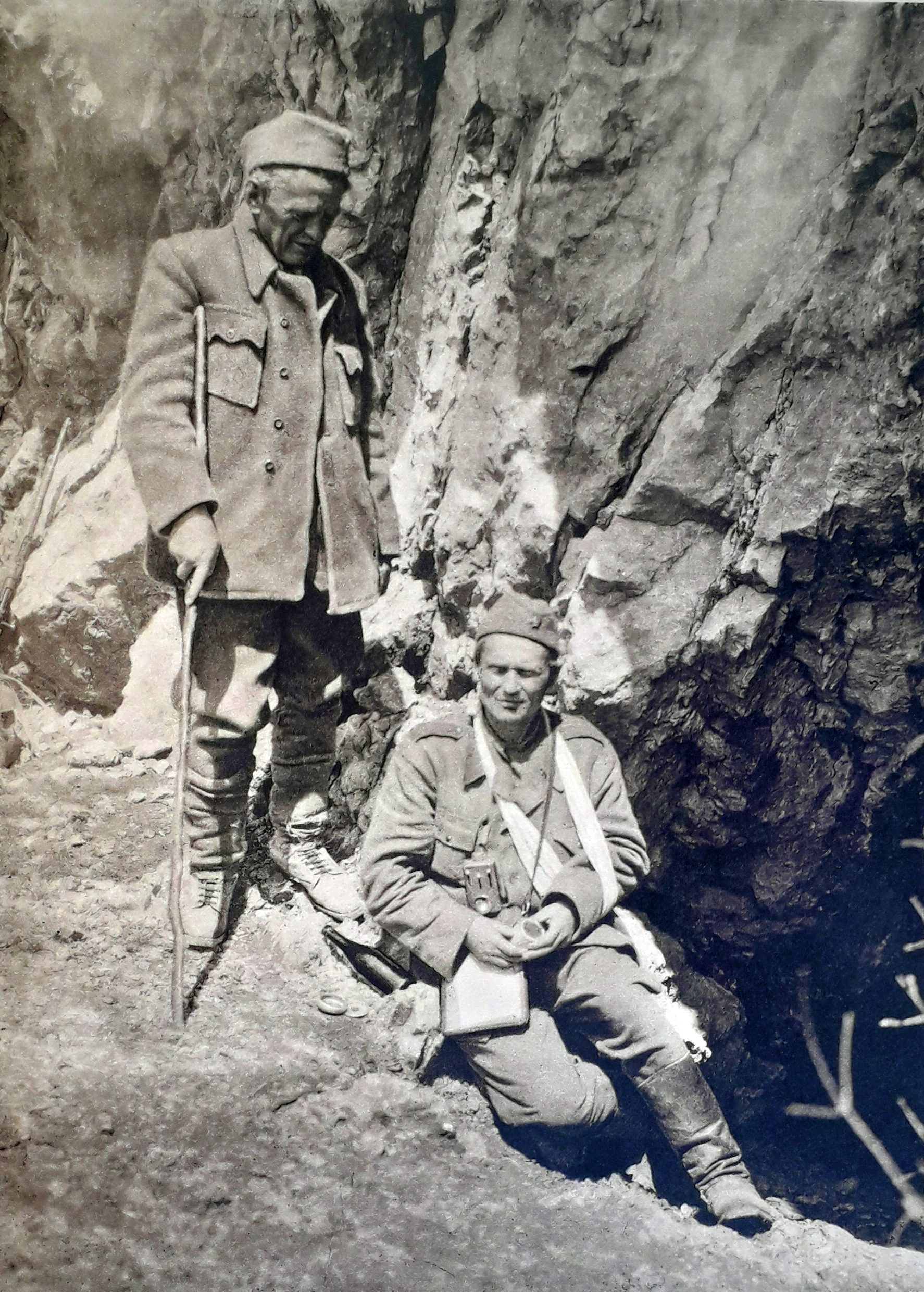
Supreme Commander Josip Broz Tito and Ivan Ribar during the Battle of the Sutjeska photo credit: Savo Orović

On 9 June, Tito was nearly killed on Milinklade when a bomb fell near the leading group, wounding him in the arm. The popular post-war report of the event credited Tito's German Shepherd dog Luks, for sacrificing his life to save Tito's. Captain William F. Stewart (a Special Operations Executive operative who was parachuted into Tito's headquarters alongside Captain William Deakin during May) was also killed by the explosion.

=== Phase V: Partisan breakthrough toward eastern Bosnia (10 June – 15 June) ===
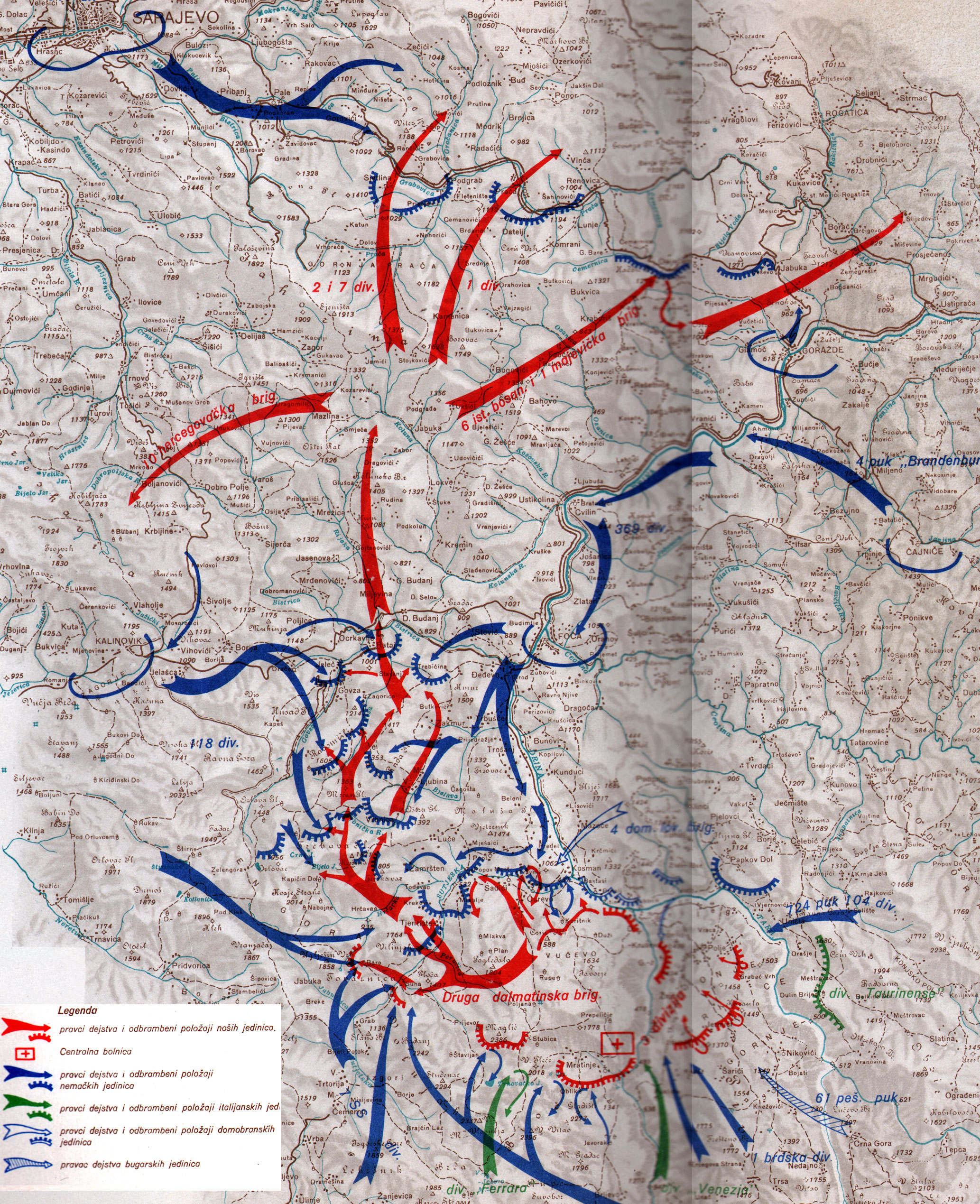
Situation in June and direction of partisan breakthrough

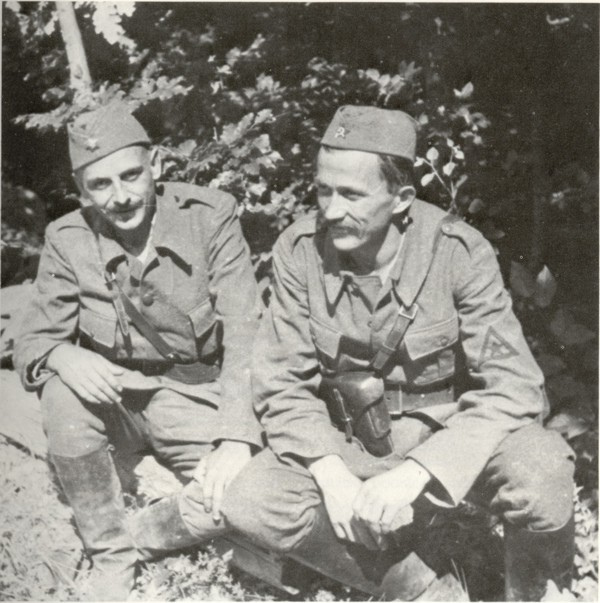
Commanders of 1st Proletarian Division Koča Popović and Danilo Lekić during battle of Sutjeska

Facing almost exclusively German troops, the Yugoslav National Liberation Army (YNLA) finally succeeded in breaking out across the Sutjeska river through the lines of the German 118th and 104th Jäger and 369th (Croatian) Infantry divisions in the northwestern direction, towards eastern Bosnia. Three brigades and the central hospital with over 2000 wounded were surrounded. Following Hitler's instructions, German commander in chief Generaloberst Alexander Löhr ordered their annihilation, including the wounded and the unarmed medical personnel.

== War crimes ==
Of the more than 6,000 killed Partisan fighters in Sutjeska, a large number were exhausted fighters and wounded who were executed by the Germans. The report of the 1st Mountain Division says: "Captured: 498, of which 411 were shot." Most of the immobile wounded (about 700 of them) were hidden by partisans, with nurses. However, the Germans, searching the terrain with search dogs, killed them almost to the last, together with the nurses. In addition, a large number of civilians were also killed.

The SS Mountain Division was also notorious for killing civilians suspected of helping partisans.

At the post-war trial, generals Alexander Löhr, Fritz Neidholdt and Josef Kübler and at that time Standartenführer August Schmidhuber were charged with war crimes during the battle. They were sentenced to death and executed in 1947.

== Aftermath ==
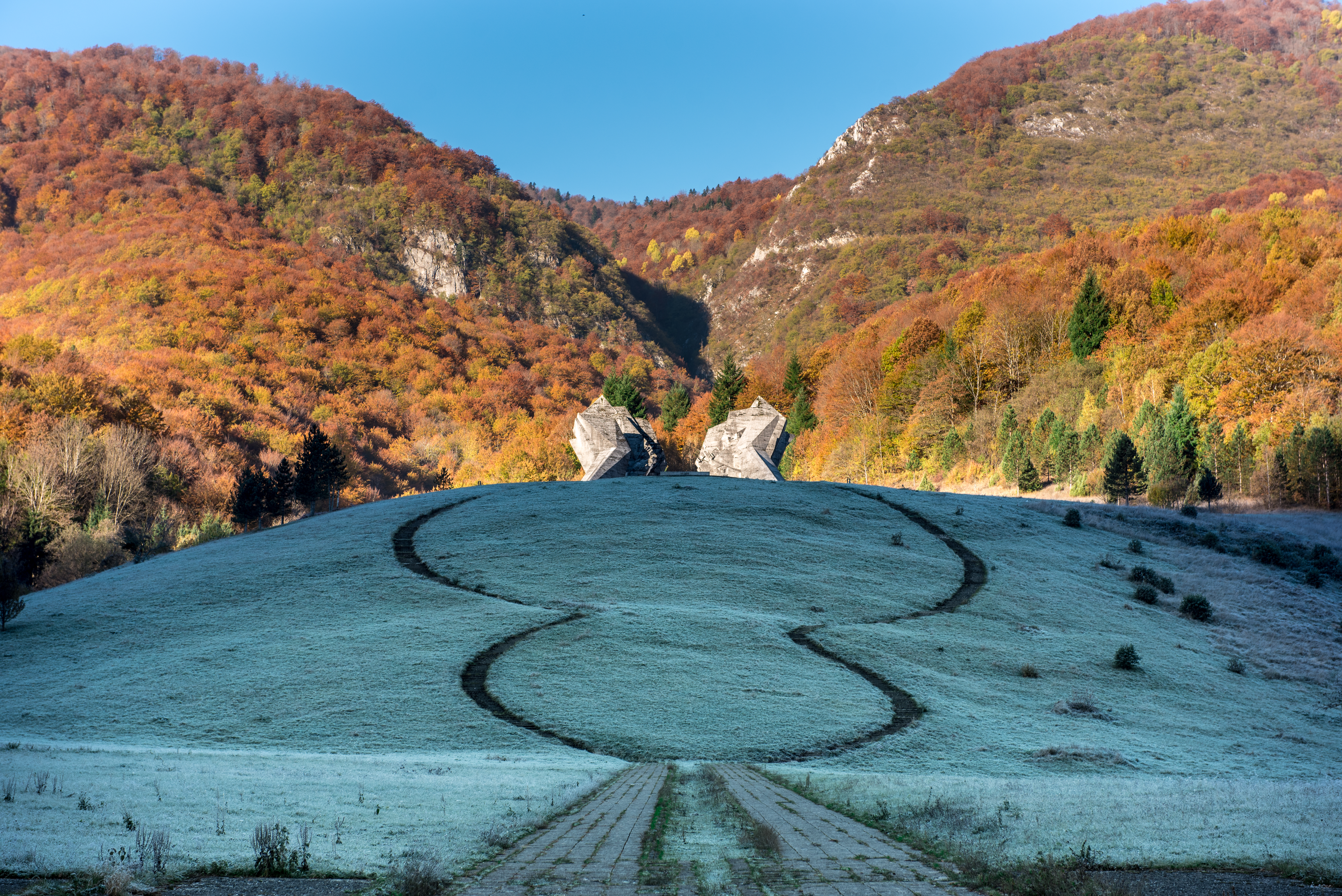
Battle of Sutjeska Memorial at Tjentište

In total, there were 7,543 partisan casualties, more than a third of the initial force. The German field commander, General Rudolf Lüters, in his final report, described the so-called "communist rebels" as "well organized, skillfully led and with combat morale unbelievably high".

The successful Partisan breakout helped their reputation as a viable fighting force with the local populace. Consequently, they were able to replenish their losses with new recruits, regroup, and mount a series of counterattacks in eastern Bosnia, clearing Axis garrisons of Vlasenica, Srebrenica, Olovo, Kladanj and Zvornik in the following 20 days.

The battle marked a turning point toward Partisan control of Yugoslavia, and became an integral part of the Yugoslav post-war mythology, celebrating the self-sacrifice, extreme suffering and moral firmness of the partisans.

== Order of battle ==
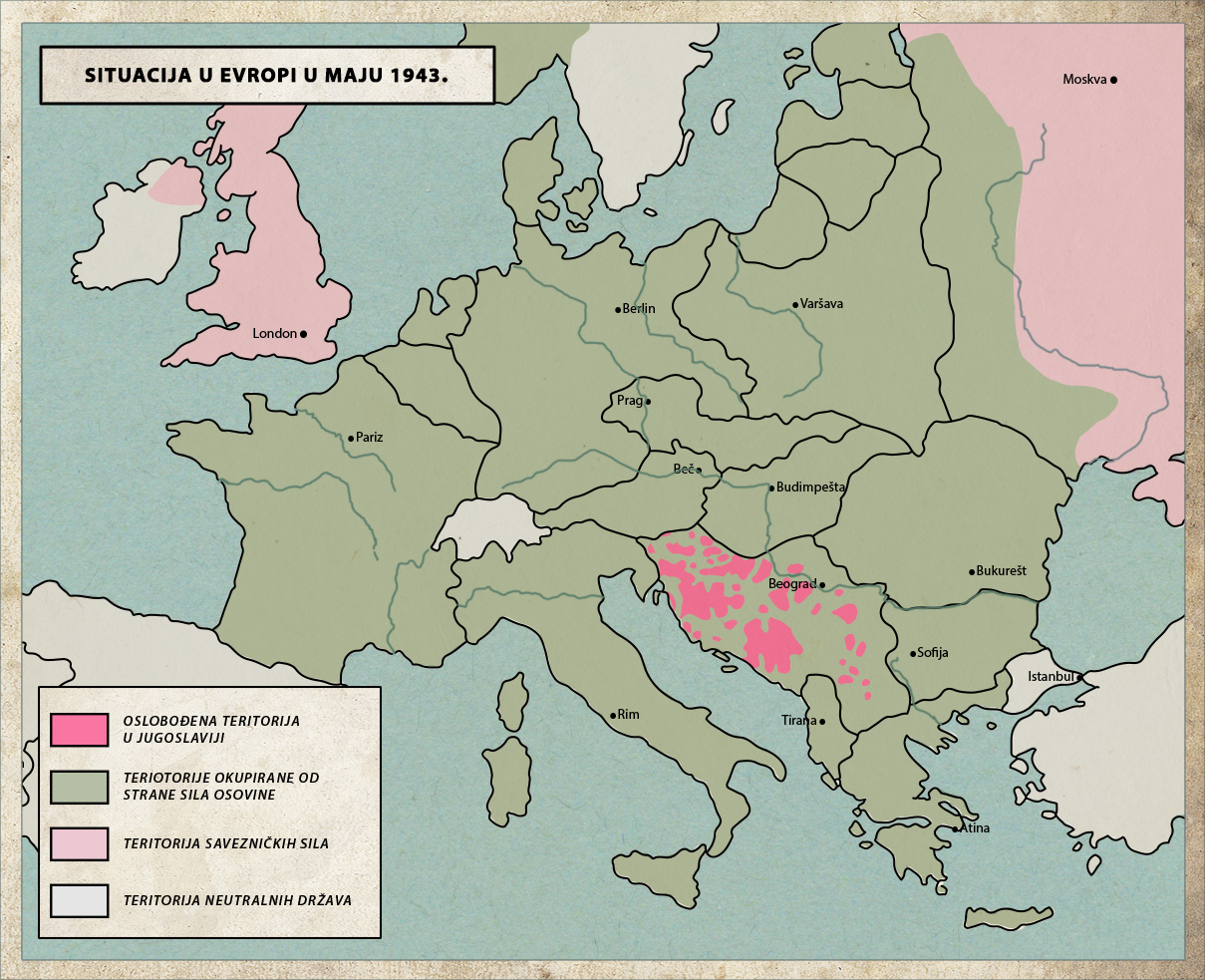
Liberated territory in Yugoslavia, May 1943

=== Allied order of battle ===
(Democratic Federal Yugoslavia) Yugoslav Partisans (Partisans Main Operational Group)

- 1st Proletarian Division – commanded by Koča Popović
- 2nd Proletarian Division – commanded by Peko Dapčević
- 3rd Assault Division – commanded by Radovan Vukanović, and later by Sava Kovačević
- 7th Banija Division – commanded by Pavle Jakšić
- 6th Proletarian Brigade
- 15th Majevica Brigade

=== Axis order of battle ===
Germany

- 7th SS Volunteer Mountain Division Prinz Eugen – commander Karl von Oberkamp
- 1st Mountain Division – commander Walter Stettner
- 118th Jäger Division – commander Josef Kübler
- 369th (Croatian) Infantry Division – commander Fritz Neidholdt
- Regiment 4 Brandenburg
- reinforced 724th Infantry Regiment (104th Jäger Division)

Italy

- 1st Alpine Division "Taurinense"
- 19th Infantry Division "Venezia"
- 23rd Infantry Division "Ferrara"
- 32nd Infantry Division "Marche"
- 151st Infantry Division "Perugia"
- 154th Infantry Division "Murge"
- forces of Sector Podgorica

Croatia

- 4th Home Guard Jäger Brigade

Bulgaria

- 63rd Infantry Regiment
- 61st Infantry Regiment also in the area
  (both units under the command of the 369th (Croatian) Infantry Division)

== In film ==
Battle of Sutjeska was made into a film in 1973, Sutjeska, with Richard Burton playing the lead as Josip Broz Tito, leader of the partisan forces.

== In song ==
There are several songs about the Battle of Sutjeska. One of the more popular is called "Sivi Sokole", which translates to peregrine falcon. It mentions the death of Commander Sava Kovačević.

Serbo-Croatian

Sivi sokole, prijatelju stari,
Daj mi krila, sokole da preletim planine.

Visoka je planina, nebo iznad nje,
A na nebu sivi soko, gleda na mene.

Duboka je Sutjeska, kanjon iznad nje
Na kanjonu Tito stoji, gleda ranjene

Na kanjonu Tito stoji i poručuje
Sutjeska se mora proći, da spasimo ranjene
Sivi sokole...

Sutjeska je probijena, ranjeni su spašeni
A naš stari heroj Sava osta mrtav da leži
Sivi sokole...

Radili smo, radimo, radit ćemo još
Druže Tito, kunemo se, pobijedit ćemo

English

Peregrine falcon, old friend of mine,
Give me wings, falcon, that I may fly over the mountains.

The mountain is high, the sky above it,
And in the sky the peregrine falcon, looking down upon me.

Sutjeska is deep, the canyon above it
Above the canyon stands Tito, watches over the wounded

Above the canyon stands Tito and commands,
The Sutjeska must be crossed to save the wounded,
Peregrine falcon...

Sutjeska is breached, the wounded are saved
But our old hero Sava remained lying dead
Peregrine falcon...

We have toiled, we toil, we will toil still
Comrade Tito, we pledge, we will triumph.

== Memorial complex ==
Sculptor Miodrag Živković designed the memorial complex, dedicated to the Battle of the Sutjeska in the 1970s. The complex contains frescoes by the Croatian artist Krsto Hegedušić.

== See also ==
- Seven anti-Partisan offensives
- Resistance during World War II
- Axis anti-partisan operations in World War II

== Sources ==
=== Books ===
- Hoare, Marko Attila (2006). Genocide and Resistance in Hitler's Bosnia: The Partisans and the Chetniks. Oxford University Press. p. 341. ISBN 978-0-19-726380-8.
- Deakin, Frederick William (1971). The embattled mountain. Oxford: Oxford University Press.
- Maclean, Fitzroy (1949). Eastern Approaches. Penguin Group.
- Milovanović, Nikola (1983). Draža Mihailović. Vol. Poraz. Belgrade: Slovo ljubve. OCLC 491065064.
- Schmider, Klaus (2002). Partisanenkrieg in Jugoslawien 1941–1944 [Partisan war in Yugoslavia 1941–1944] (in German). Hamburg: Mittler. ISBN 978-3-8132-0794-1.
- Kučan, Viktor (1996). Borci Sutjeske. Zavod za udžbenike i nastavna sredstva: Beograd. ISBN 978-86-17-04984-1.
- Tomasevich, Jozo (1975). The Chetniks. Stanford University Press. ISBN 978-0804708579.
- Tomasevich, Jozo (2001). War and Revolution in Yugoslavia: 1941 - 1945. Stanford University Press. ISBN 978-0804779241.
- Terzić, Velimir (1958). Đurović, Milinko (ed.). Sutjeska. Belgrade: Vojno-izdavački zavod.

=== Journals ===
- Trifkovic, Gaj (2011). "A Case of Failed Counter-Insurgency: Anti-Partisan Operations in Yugoslavia 1943". The Journal of Slavic Military Studies. 24 (4): 314–336. doi:10.1080/13518046.2011.572733. ISSN 1556-3006. S2CID 143233788.
