= Tatjana Burmazovic =

Serbian volleyball player (born 1984)

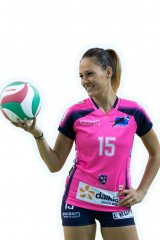

Personal information
- Nickname: Buki
- Nationality: (Serbia) Serbian / (France) French
- Born: 6th of February 1984 Sremska Mitrovica, Serbia
- Height: 172 cm (5 ft 8 in)
- Weight: 63 kg (139 lb)

Volleyball information
- Current club: (France) Nantes volleyball
- Number: 15

Career
- Years: Team
- 1999 - 2003 2003 - 2004 2004 - 2005 2005 - 2006 2006 - 2007 2007 - 2011 2011 - 2012 2012 - 2018 2018 - 2020: (Serbia) OK Srem (Serbia) OK Crvena Zvezda (Bosnia and Herzegovina) OK Zeljeznicar (Bosnia and Herzegovina) OK Modrica (Bulgaria) VC CSKA (France) Beziers Volley (France) Vandoeuvre les Nancy (France) Evreux Volleyball (France) Nantes Volleyball

Tatjana Burmazovic (Serbian Cyrillic: Татјана Бурмазовић; February 6, 1984) is a Serbian volleyball player, playing on a position of libero, born in Sremska Mitrovica, Serbia. She was voted best cadet in Yugoslavia in 2000, best libero in Yugoslavia in 2002 and best beach volley player in 2006. Her career includes playing both as a volleyball and a beach volleyball player. She was a member of Serbian junior national team for 3 years, and a member of Serbian beach volleyball national team for 8 years. Between 2002 and 2003, she participated in CEV CUP with volleyball team SREM. Between 2003 and 2004, she participated in Indesit European Champions League with OK Crvena Zvezda. And between 2007 and 2008, she participated in CEV Challenge Cup with Béziers Volley.

== Achievements ==
- (Serbia) Serbian Volleyball League
  - Winner 2003 - 2004
- (Serbia) Serbian Cup
  - Winner 2003 - 2004
- (Bulgaria) Bulgarian Volleyball League
  - Winner 2006 - 2007
- (France) French Cup
  - Finalist 2018–2019
- (France) French Volleyball League
  - Finalist 2018-2019
