= Bjelojevići, Montenegro =

Bjelojevići Бјелојевићи
- Village
- Location within Montenegro
- Coordinates: 42.935575°N 19.599455°E
- Country: Montenegro
- Region: Northern
- Municipality: Mojkovac

Population (2011)
  - Total: 202
- Time zone: UTC+1 (CET)
  - Summer (DST): UTC+2 (CEST)

Bjelojevići (Montenegrin Cyrillic: Бјелојевићи) is a village in the municipality of Mojkovac, Montenegro.

== Demographics ==
According to the 2011 census, its population was 202.

Ethnicity in 2011
Ethnicity	Number	Percentage
Montenegrins	116	57.4%
Serbs	73	36.1%
other/undeclared	13	6.4%
Total	202	100%
