= Bjelojevići, Stolac =

Bjelojevići
- Village
- Location within Bosnia and Herzegovina
- Coordinates: 43.1224096°N 17.855964°E
- Country: Bosnia and Herzegovina
- Entity: Federation of Bosnia and Herzegovina
- Canton: Herzegovina-Neretva
- Municipality: Stolac

Area
  - Total: 17.89 sq mi (46.34 km^{2})

Population (2013)
  - Total: 229
  - Density: 12.8/sq mi (4.94/km^{2})
- Time zone: UTC+1 (CET)
  - Summer (DST): UTC+2 (CEST)

Bjelojevići is a village in the municipality of Stolac, Bosnia and Herzegovina.

== Demographics ==
According to the 2013 census, its population was 229.

Ethnicity in 2013
Ethnicity	Number	Percentage
Croats	224	97.8%
Bosniaks	5	2.2%
Total	229	100%
