= Burmazi, Stolac =

Burmazi
- Village
- Location within Bosnia and Herzegovina
- Coordinates: 43.0139005°N 17.9562091°E
- Country: Bosnia and Herzegovina
- Entity: Republika Srpska; Federation of Bosnia and Herzegovina
- Canton: Herzegovina-Neretva
- Municipality: Berkovići; Stolac

Area
  - Total: 12.98 sq mi (33.61 km^{2})

Population (2013)
  - Total: 223
  - Density: 17.2/sq mi (6.63/km^{2})
- Time zone: UTC+1 (CET)
  - Summer (DST): UTC+2 (CEST)

Burmazi is a village in the municipalities of Berkovići, Republika Srpska, and Stolac, the Herzegovina-Neretva Canton, the Federation of Bosnia and Herzegovina, Bosnia and Herzegovina.

== Demographics ==
According to the 2013 census, its population was zero in the Berkovići part, and 223 in the Stolac part.

Ethnicity in 2013
Ethnicity	Number	Percentage
Croats	193	86.5%
Bosniaks	30	13.5%
Total	223	100%
