= Albanian Offensive into Yugoslavia =

Military campaign, 1944–1945

- Part of World War II in Yugoslavia and Albanian Civil War (1943–1944)
Date	October 1944 – early 1945 (90 Days)
Location	Sandžak, Montenegro, Kosovo, Bosnia
Result	LANÇ-Partisan victory: LANÇ occupation of Kosovo

Belligerents
LANÇ; Yugoslav Partisans	Germany; Balli Kombëtar; Chetniks; Sandžak Muslim militia (surrendered)

Commanders and leaders
Hysni Kapo; Hysni Daja; Shefqet Peçi; Ramiz Alia; Gjin Marku; Skënder Libohova †	Unknown

Strength
22,000 LANÇ troops Yugoslav Partisan brigades	(Nazi Germany) 40,000 German troops 10,000 Ballist troops

Casualties and losses
350–600 Albanian Partisans	Heavy

The Albanian Offensive into Yugoslavia was a joint military campaign conducted in late 1944 and early 1945 by the National Liberation Army of Albania (LANÇ) in cooperation with the Yugoslav Partisans in the Sandžak region and other territories in Yugoslavia. The offensive aimed to expel German, Chetnik, and collaborationist forces from Montenegro, Kosovo, and parts of Serbia.

== Background ==
Following the liberation of Shkodër, Albanian Partisan forces crossed the border to assist the Yugoslav Partisans. According to Enver Hoxha and Ramiz Alia, this action was part of the internationalist mission of the Albanian army to support the anti-fascist struggle beyond its borders.

== Operations ==
Immediately following the liberation of Shkodër, forces of the 6th Division also crossed Albanian Border pursuing German troops towards Podgorica. Detachments of this division waged battles and on December 2, 1944, liberated Tuzi and by the second half of the month of December had liberated Podgorica. They then advanced towards Novi Pazar, Nova Varoš, Bioče, Bijelo Polje and Lijeva Rijeka. Then they launched their attacks against enemy troops and, inflicting on them great damage in lives and material, compelled them to withdraw from Montenegro and from many towns and villages in Bosnia and Herzegovina up to the city of Višegrad and Rudo for the liberation of which Yugoslav partisan forces took also part in fighting. The fighting here lasted over one month.

=== Battle of Medun Castle ===
Not far from the Kuči settlement, near a pass, in the first short meeting that took place with the battalion cadres, it was said that with the departure of the 6th Assault Brigade, the enemy had reoccupied the lost positions. The Medun Fortress remained the main objective again. There were also a series of hills that stretched to the right, left and deep inside it. The attack was a matter of hours. On December 12, 1944, alongside the other forces of the Brigade, the second battalion was also prepared for the attack. The approach was made during the night. The attack would first start on the side of the fortress and then on its back. In this way, the Partisans would have an easier time taking the fortress, because it was strongly supported on both sides of it, where the natural strong positions were clearly visible. The crackling of automatic weapons, machine guns and grenades were heard everywhere. The enemy opened fire. All sectors were well covered by the Germans, but the Partisans, taking advantage of the night and surprise, advanced towards the center of the Medun village. Under these conditions, the Germans were forced to abandon several positions. On the right flank, the second and fourth battalions continued their attacks successfully. In this way, the sector where the first battalion operated was somewhat relieved. In order to escape the encirclement, the enemy began to withdraw. When day fell, the Partisans had entered the village. Meanwhile, the Germans began to pound all the hills of Medun with artillery. The pace of the Partisan attack decreased. From there, at 16.00, the Partisans reached the line of the Medun-Kuči road, and even captured a dominant hill to its left. Moving forward during the day was impossible, as enemy fire cut it short. Therefore, the Partisan attack was stopped. The arrival line was now the Kuči-Podgorica road. The Partisans of both battalions concentrated in the characteristic holes that this region of Montenegro has. Partisan guards were stationed on the hills and in certain places. The weather was good but it was quite cold. Fire could not be lit, but there was no wood there either. In these battles, the enemy had about 16 killed. Of the Partisans, Veri Tego Gjata, Llambi Ciko and Bektash Saliu were killed.

=== Bombings over Podgorica ===
British and US planes heavily bombed the city of Podgorica. The Partisans approached the edge of the high hill from where this attack was well observed. The planes left only after they had leveled the city of Podgorica. At this time, several other cadres of the brigade arrived. The XXII Assault Brigade had liberated Tuzi. It was December 14, 1944 when the cadres finished explaining the task. They dispersed and their comrades were informed that the Yugoslav 9th Brigade would be moved to the right wing of the Division. The 7th Brigade would operate in the center of the Division. It was learned that the enemy consisted of more than 40,000 forces, not counting the Chetniks and other remnants of the Yugoslav reaction. To the left and right of the highway they had built defensive belts, with detached trenches and fortified fire centers. It was clearly understood that our path would not be easy.

=== Battle in the Morača Valley ===
Former Colonel Hysni Daja also described a battle against German forces fought near the Medun-Kuči highway, where many partisan were killed. Regarding that event, Daja wrote:

"The enemy forces coming from Podgorica were so numerous and diverse that wherever a bullet was fired, it did not go empty. Seeing from the right the Bardhoshe Hill that was ablaze from the attack of the second battalion. Skënder, the battalion commissar leading the first company, encountered artificial obstacles, wire and wood. Immediately, two brave partisans went near him and helped him. They were Muharrem Mehmeti and Faik Celi. Both were killed in front of him. Two other partisans jumped further, leaving them wounded. But the path was opened. While commissar Skënder Libohova went to help the two wounded, other partisans filled that nerve center that the Germans did not want to let go. One of the company commissars quickly grabbed a machine gun and opened fire on the German column that was not exhausted. It was Fani Tangu. The Germans were reinforced with other forces and, without stopping the attack, they captured several objects that had been launched earlier. They concentrated an unprecedented fire. A shell fatally hit Skënder Libohovë. Everyone was stunned for a moment, but the fight did not stop. The other comrades continued it furiously until the morning of the next day. The crackling and flames of that night could not be compared to anything else. In this unprecedented battle, we were also helped by the allied Anglo-American aircraft. The enemy received large reinforcements from the Bioča valley, where his concentrations were so great that even the ground could not contain them. The enemy's fire was dense and the bullets that hit the rocks emitted blinding sparks. Two partisans were wounded at once, but they managed to throw grenades and, as they were, stepping on a dead German corpse, they were able to capture the main fort. After heavy fire, the fight began. The Moraca Valley was boiling along the entire front line. The creaks could be heard from Verusha to the south of Podgorica. The line of fire often turned into a winding line. All efforts were made to hold that hill that was taken with great sacrifices. - Let us hold it around our necks here - said the wounded partisans who were huddled at the foot of the fort in unison. This was the morale of the partisans. Although part of the forces of the fourth battalion came to their aid, the situation did not improve. Four more partisans were wounded, including the battalion commander, Mit'hat Luçi, and the commissar, Zoi Bano. Before dawn, the partisans withdrew. The Germans had suffered heavy losses. The German forces themselves confirmed the damage caused to people and equipment. They even went so far as to say that they themselves burned the convoy of 200-300 vehicles,while someone attributed it to the Allied aviation. In fact, they were destroyed by three companies of the 7th Brigade, which, by order of the brigade headquarters, entered deep into the area in a diversionary manner until they were close to them. "Where the foot of the infantry steps, victory is confirmed," says the art of war."

=== Kosovo Operation ===
The main forces involved in this undertaking were Bulgarian 2nd Army supported by the Yugoslav 24th and 46th Divisions as well as the 1st through 5th "Kosovo-Metohija" Brigades and the Albanian 3rd and 5th Brigades of the People's Liberation Army of Albania. These forces were assisted by air sorties of the Western Allies and the Soviets against units of Generaloberst Alexander Löhr's Army Group "E" as the latter retreated from Greece. The Axis order of battle against the Bulgarians and Yugoslavs in this operation comprised some 17,000 men including the Kampfgruppe "Langer" with three infantry companies, one artillery battery and one platoon of tanks, Kampfgruppe "Bredow" with six infantry battalions, three artillery battalions and 10 tanks), Kampfgruppe "Skanderbeg" with about 7,000 men of Waffen-SS August Schmidhuber's 21st Mountain Division "Skanderbeg" and about 4,000 German navy personnel making their way to the north from Greece.

The Germans were supported by some 10,000 men of the Balli Kombëtar (National Front), the Albanian nationalist, anti-communist and anti-monarchist organisation. The Albanian nationalist forces and the 21st Waffen Mountain Division SS "Skanderbeg" served as the rearguard for the Wehrmacht's retreat, helping the Germans successfully withdraw large forces from Greece and Albania. The SS Skanderbeg was extensively utilised by the Germans, advancing into the mountains and engaging Partisan troops on a daily basis, to cover the flanks of the Wehrmacht. As the offensive against the Germans drove into full swing the SS "Skanderbeg" was issued with orders to increase repression of the Partisan forces and any sympathisers. In keeping with these orders, 131 NLM (Albanian Partisan) prisoners were shot or hanged in Kosovo by members of the division by 23 October.

The 3rd and 5th Brigades had crossed into Kosovo in October 1944, and, in collaboration with the local partisan forces, had taken part in the fighting for the liberation of Prizren and Gjakova, and later of Ferizaj, Mitrovica, Pristina and Drenica. Upon the formation of the 5th Division, the 25th Brigade joined them.

== Aftermath ==
The coffins with the remains of 300 partisans came to Albania in December 1975 and they were brought by another commission, which went to Yugoslavia after our emergency return to Tirana. Their arrival was accompanied by a grand ceremony in “Skënderbej” square, where 300 coffins were placed on the steps in front of the Palace of Culture and where the entire Political Bureau participated. After that, they were taken to the National Martyrs’ Cemetery in Tirana or other districts.

== See also ==
- World War II in Yugoslavia
- World War II in Albania
- Yugoslav Partisans
- Albanian Civil War (1943-1944)
- Kosovo Operation (1944)
- Balli Kombëtar
- Chetniks
- German winter offensive in Albania (1943-1944)
- LANÇ counter-offensive in Albania (1944)

== Sources ==
- Biddiscombe, Alexander (2006). The SS Hunter Battalions: The Hidden History of the Nazi Resistance Movement 1944–45. Tempus. ISBN 9780752439389.
- Fischer, Bernd Jürgen (1999). Albania at War, 1939–1945. C. Hurst & Co. Publishers. ISBN 978-1-85065-531-2.
- Lakić, Zoran (1963). Narodnooslobodilačka borba u Crnoj Gori, 1941–1945: hronologija događaja.
- Motadel, David (2014). Islam and Nazi Germany's War. Cambridge, Massachusetts: Harvard University Press. ISBN 978-0-674-72460-0.
