= OB Südost =

The General Commander in the South East (German: Oberbefehlshaber Südost; initials OB Südost) was the overall command of the German Armed Forces in Greece and the Balkans between 1943 and 1945 during World War II. It was directly subordinate to German Armed Forces High Command.

== History ==
Overall command of the Germans forces in Greece and the Balkans was, together with Italy, in the hands of Albert Kesselring as OB Süd until the end of 1942.

From 1 January 1943 a new post of Oberbefehlshaber Südost (Commander-in-Chief Southeast) was created and given to Alexander Löhr, the commander of the 12th Army, who occupied the area at that time. The forces under his command were reformed into Army Group E.

In August 1943 a second Army Group F was created in the Balkans under command of Generalfeldmarschall Maximilian von Weichs. As von Weichs outranked Alexander Löhr, he was appointed OB Südost and the HQ of Army Group E became subordinated to the new Army Group F.

After almost 2 years of heavy fighting, Army Group F was disbanded on 25 March 1945, and Alexander Löhr again assumed the role of OB Südost.

== Commanders ==
No.	Portrait	Name	Took office	Left office	Time in office
1	Alexander Löhr	Generaloberst; Alexander Löhr (1885–1947)	1 January 1943	26 August 1943	237 days
2	Maximilian von Weichs	Generalfeldmarschall; Maximilian von Weichs (1881–1954)	26 August 1943	25 March 1945	1 year, 211 days
3	Alexander Löhr	Generaloberst; Alexander Löhr (1885–1947)	25 March 1945	8 May 1945	44 days

== Sources ==
- Axis History
