= Hostages Trial =

1947–8 war crimes trial in Nuremberg, Germany

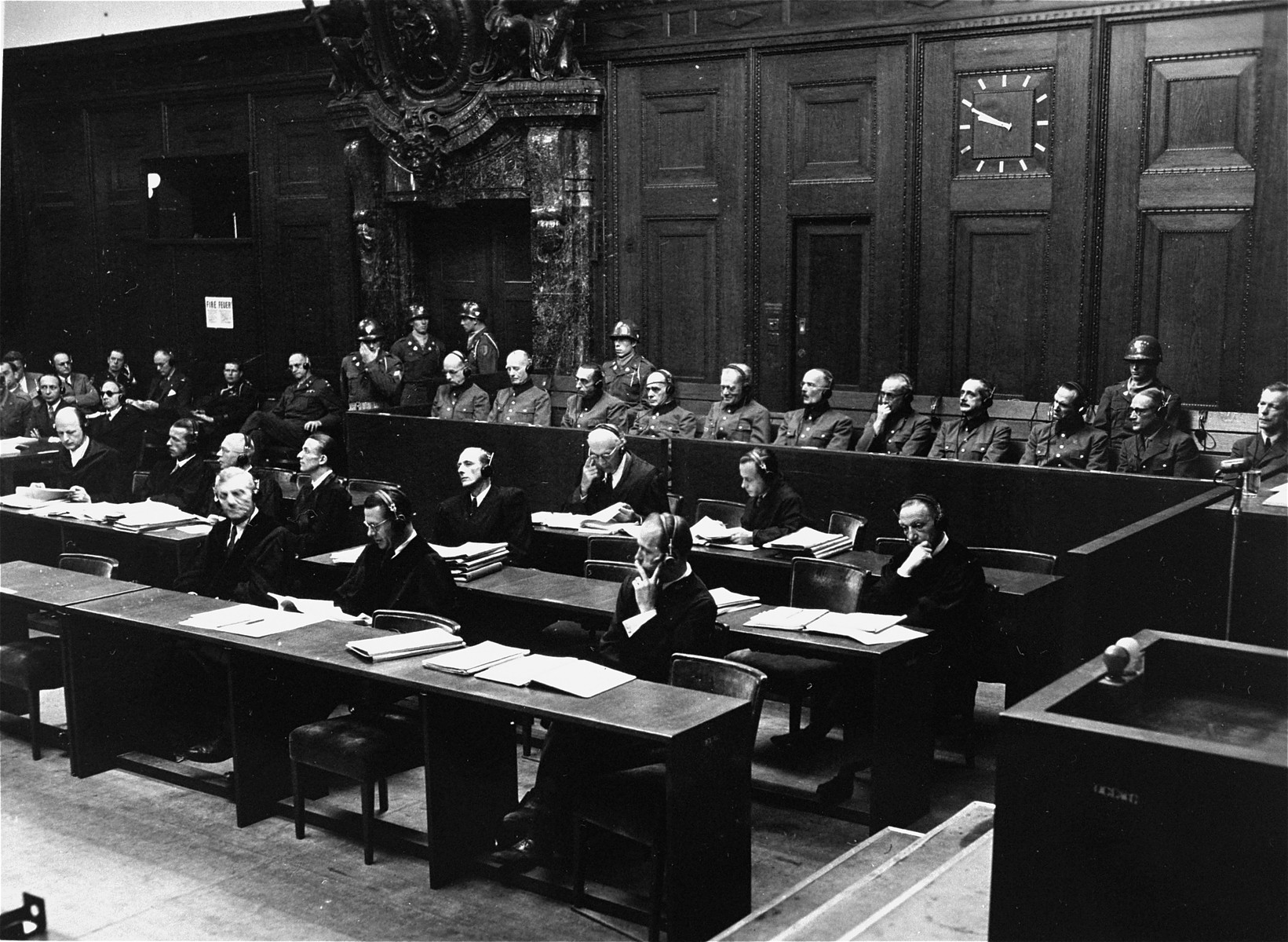
Defendants in the dock and their lawyers during the Hostages Trial

The United States of America v. Wilhelm List, et al., commonly known as the Hostages Trial, was the seventh of the twelve "Subsequent Nuremberg trials" for war crimes and crimes against humanity after the end of World War II between 1947 and 1948. The accused were 12 Wehrmacht generals of the Balkan Campaign charged with ordering the hostage-taking of civilians, wanton shootings of these hostages, the reprisal killings of civilians, and the execution without trial of captured "partisans" (both real and suspected) perpetrated by German troops in occupied Greece, Albania and Yugoslavia. Defendant Lothar Rendulic was further charged for using scorched earth in Finland during the Lapland War in 1944.

The Hostages Trial was held by United States authorities at the Palace of Justice in Nuremberg in the American occupation zone before US military courts, not before the International Military Tribunal. Two were found guilty of 3 counts, four of 2 counts, and two of 1 count, receiving prison sentences ranging from seven years to life imprisonment, and four were acquitted of all charges. Franz Böhme committed suicide before the arraignment, and Maximilian von Weichs was severed from the trial for medical reasons.

The judges in this case, heard before Military Tribunal V, were Charles F. Wennerstrum (presiding judge) from Iowa, George J. Burke from Michigan, and Edward F. Carter from Nebraska. The Chief of Counsel for the Prosecution was Telford Taylor, the chief prosecutor for this case was Theodore Fenstermacher. The indictment was filed on May 10, 1947; the trial lasted from July 8, 1947, until February 19, 1948.

== Case ==
Nazi Germany launched an invasion of Yugoslavia in April 1941, establishing the German Military Occupation zone in Serbia, propping up the Independent State of Croatia as a puppet state, and dividing the remainder of Yugoslavia to be annexed by neighbouring Axis countries. The Wehrmacht occupation force and their collaborators faced resistance from the various anti-German partisan organisations. German commanders responded to partisan attacks with extremely harsh reprisal attacks against civilians. One of the tactics used was taking groups of civilians as hostages, who would then be summarily executed in the event of a partisan attack.

Lothar Rendulic was additionally charged for his use of scorched earth tactics in Finnish Lapland during the Lapland War in the winter of 1944. Rendulic was accused of ordering the destruction of Rovaniemi, allegedly as revenge against Finland for making a separate peace with the Soviet Union.

== Indictment ==
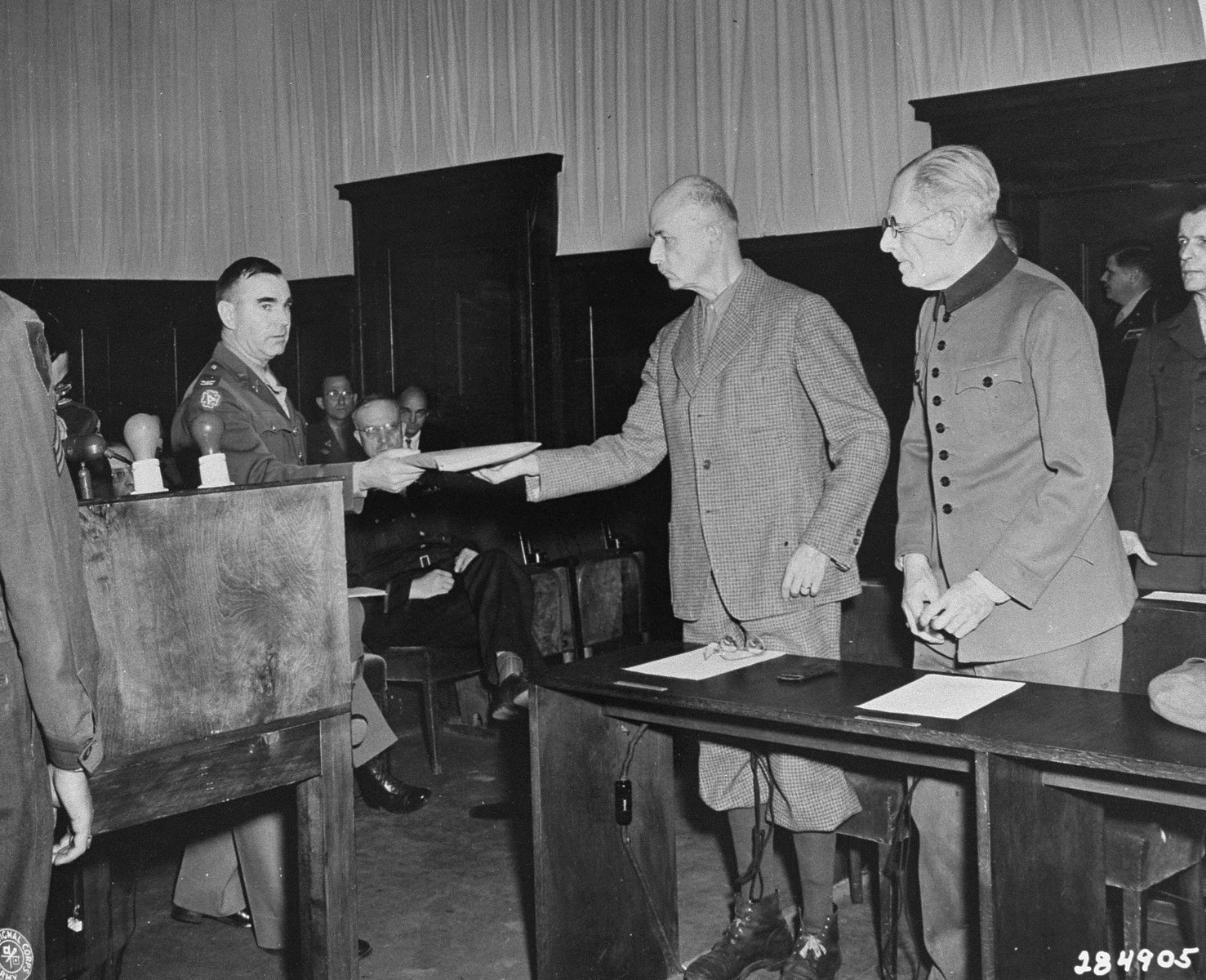
Wilhelm List is handed the indictment in the Hostages Trial. Standing beside him is Maximilian von Weichs.

The accused faced four charges of having committed war crimes and crimes against humanity:

1. Mass murder of hundreds of thousands of civilians in Greece, Albania, and Yugoslavia by having ordered hostage taking and reprisal killings.
2. Plundering and wanton destruction of villages and towns in Norway, Greece, Albania, Yugoslavia.
3. Murder and ill-treatment of prisoners of war, and arbitrarily designating combatants as "partisans", denying them the status of prisoners of war, as well as their killing.
4. Murder, torture, deportation, and sending to concentration camps of Greek, Albanian, and Yugoslav civilians.

All defendants were indicted on all counts and all pleaded "not guilty".

== Judges ==
The judges were all from the Midwestern United States and represented a more conservative perspective on the Nuremberg trial proceedings from that taken by the East Coast judges who had presided over earlier trials in the series. In particular the judges were inclined to treat the prosecution case with considerable suspicion. The judges ruled that captured partisan or guerrilla resistance fighters could never expect to be given the protected status of prisoners of war, and could lawfully be executed without trial. Furthermore, the judges departed explicitly from the Nuremberg Principles established in the International Military Tribunal, in ruling that the killing of hostages and reprisal killings of innocent individual civilians might be lawful if undertaken by an occupying power as a response to resistance forces engaging in partisan warfare, albeit subject to stringent constraints. Following the judgement, Justice Charles F. Wennerstrum gave an interview to the Chicago Tribune in which he accused the prosecution of failing "to maintain objectivity aloof from vindictiveness, [and] aloof from personal ambitions for convictions" and dismissed the whole Nuremberg exercise as "victor’s justice". He proposed that many of the German Jewish emigrants employed in the prosecution office were of suspect loyalty to the United States; "The whole atmosphere here is unwholesome.... Lawyers, clerks, interpreters and researchers are employed who became Americans only in recent years; whose backgrounds were embedded in Europe's hatreds and prejudices."

== Defendants ==
Portrait	Name	Function at time of offense	Charges				Sentence
Portrait	Name	Function at time of offense	1	2	3	4	Sentence
	Wilhelm List	Field Marshal, Commander in Chief South-East 1941–1942, head of the German 12th Army in 1941	G	I	G	I	Life imprisonment; released in December 1952 for medical reasons; died in 1971
	Maximilian von Weichs	Field Marshal, commander of the German 2nd Army during the Balkans Campaign with the rank of a Generaloberst	I	I	I	I	Removed from the trial due to illness; died in 1954
	Lothar Rendulic	Generaloberst, Commander of the 2nd Panzer Army in Yugoslavia 1943–44; from 1944, Commander of the 20th Mountain Army and all German troops stationed in Finland and Norway	G	I	G	G	20 years; commuted to 10 years; released in 1951; died in 1971
	Walter Kuntze	General der Pioniere, successor of List as Commander in Chief South-East and head of the 12th Army as of October 29, 1941	G	I	G	G	Life imprisonment; released in 1953 for medical reasons; died in 1960
	Hermann Foertsch	Generalmajor, Chief of Staff of the 12th Army	I	I	I	I	Acquitted; died in 1961
	Franz Böhme	General of the XVIII Mountain Corps (1940–43), successor of Rendulic in 1944	I	I	I	I	Committed suicide on May 30, 1947 (before the arraignment)
	Hellmuth Felmy	General der Flieger; commander in southern Greece	G	G	I	I	15 years; commuted to 10 years; released in 1951; died in 1965
	Hubert Lanz	General of the XXII Mountain Corps (1943–45)	G	I	G	I	12 years; released in 1951; died in 1982
	Ernst Dehner	Generalmajor, corps commander under Rendulic	G	I	I	I	7 years; released in 1951; died in 1970
	Ernst von Leyser	General der Infanterie, corps commander under Rendulic and Böhme	I	I	G	G	10 years; released in 1951; died in 1962
	Wilhelm Speidel	Generalmajor, military commander in Greece 1942-44	G	I	I	I	20 years; released in 1951; died in 1970
	Kurt von Geitner	Generalmajor, Chief of Staff of the military commanders in Serbia and Greece	I	I	I	I	Acquitted; died in 1968

I — Indicted G — Indicted and found guilty

== Verdict ==
The tribunal had to deal with two pressing questions:

1. Could partisans be "lawful belligerents" and thus entitled the protected status of prisoners of war; and was that status dependent on whether they fought in uniform or wearing distinctive military insignia?
2. Could taking (and potentially killing) civilian hostages, and retrospective reprisals against civilians, be lawful as a "defense" against guerrilla attacks and partisan warfare?

On the question of partisans, the tribunal concluded that under the current laws of war (the Hague Convention No. IV from 1907), the partisan fighters in southeast Europe could not be considered lawful belligerents under Article 1 of the convention even though most had worn distinctive military insignia in combat (a Red Star sewn onto a uniform cap) and many had fought in military uniform of one form or another, as most fought as guerrillas and as such could not consistently conform to all the conditions of belligerency laid down in the Hague Regulations for regular forces. Irregular forces who engaged in guerrilla warfare - even if they did so in uniform and carried their arms openly in combat - could not be lawful combatants if they subsequently concealed their weapons, resumed everyday clothing, and mingled with non-combatant civilians. For the tribunal, all forms of civilian armed resistance to occupation forces were unlawful, and consequently captured partisans who had hidden within or behind civilian populations could lawfully be executed as war criminals without formal trial.

German soldiers were the victims of surprise attacks by an enemy which they could not engage in open combat. After a surprise attack, the bands would hastily retreat or conceal their arms and mingle with the population with the appearance of being harmless members thereof."

... guerrillas may render great service to their country and, in the event of success, become heroes even, still they remain war criminals in the eyes of the enemy and may be treated as such. In no other way can an army guard and protect itself from the gadfly tactics of such armed resistance."

On List, the tribunal stated:

We are obliged to hold that such guerrillas were francs tireurs who, upon capture, could be subjected to the death penalty. Consequently, no criminal responsibility attaches to the defendant List because of the execution of captured partisans...

Regarding hostage taking and the retrospective killing of civilians in reprisal for guerrilla actions, the tribunal came to the conclusion that under certain circumstances, hostage taking and even reprisal killings might constitute a lawful course of action as an effective deterrent against guerrilla attacks. In the tribunal's opinion, taking hostages against armed civilian resistance (and killing them should guerrilla attacks continue) could be legitimate, subject to several conditions. The tribunal observed that both the British Manual of Military Law and the U.S. Basic Field Manual (Rules of Land Warfare) permitted the taking of reprisals to deter a civilian population threatening continued armed resistance. (The British manual did not mention killing, but the US manual included killing as a possible reprisal.) Nevertheless, the tribunal still found most of the accused guilty on count 1 of the indictment because it considered the acts committed by the German troops to be in excess of the rules under which the tribunal considered hostage taking and reprisal killings lawful; in particular that a clear connection between the populations from whom hostages had been taken and the populations within which guerrilla forces were continuing to shelter, had not been established through some form of judicial hearing; and also that, as deliberate policy the numbers of civilians killed in reprisals by troops under the command of the defendants had disproportionately exceeded the numbers of deaths due to guerrilla action in the occupying forces.

As in the case of the taking of hostages, reprisal prisoners may not be shot unless it can be shown that the population, as a whole is a party to the offence, either actively or passively. In other words, members of the population of one community cannot properly be shot in reprisal for an act against the occupation forces committed at some other place. To permit such a practice would conflict with the basic theory that sustains the practice in that there would be no deterrent effect upon the community where the offence was committed. Neither may the shooting of innocent members of the population as a reprisal measure exceed in severity the unlawful acts it is designed to correct.

Notably, the tribunal refused to take any regard at all for the Nuremberg principles established previously in the Charter of the International Military Tribunal; where it had been stated at Article 6 that the killing of hostages was itself a war crime. "War crimes: namely, violations of the laws or customs of war. Such violations shall include, but not be limited to, murder, ill-treatment or deportation to slave labour or for any other purpose of civilian population of or in occupied territory, murder or ill-treatment of prisoners of war or persons on the seas, killing of hostages, plunder of public or private property, wanton destruction of cities, towns or villages, or devastation not justified by military necessity." The prosecution case had advanced these principles as establishing the inherent criminality of hostage killing; and in rejecting these arguments the tribunal must be considered to have been asserting that the Nuremberg principles could and should be overruled in the circumstances of this case. Nevertheless, even though the tribunal maintained the potential legality of hostage killing, this did not lead them to dismiss the charges of mass murder against the defendants - with the possible exception of von Leyser.

.. an examination of the judgment shows that the Tribunal’s conclusion that the killing of hostages and reprisal prisoners may in certain circumstances be legal has not been the reason for a finding of not guilty regarding any of the accused in the trial with the possible exception of the defendant von Leyser, of whom the Tribunal said : “ The evidence concerning the killing of hostages and reprisal prisoners within the corps area is so fragmentary that we cannot say that the evidence is sufficient to support a finding that the measures taken were unlawful. The killing of hostages and reprisal prisoners is entirely lawful under certain circumstances. The evidence does not satisfactorily show in what respect, if any, the law was violated. This is a burden cast upon the prosecution which it has failed to sustain.”

One common line of defense of the accused was the Plea of Superior Orders: they stated that they were only following orders from higher up, in particular from Hitler and Field Marshal Keitel, demanding multiple deaths of civilians in reprisal for every German casualty. The tribunal recognized this defense only for some of the lower-ranked defendants, but concluded that in particular the highest-ranking officers, List and Kuntze, should have been well aware of the fact that these orders violated international law and thus should have opposed the execution of these orders, even more so as they were in a position that would have allowed them to do so.

== Clarification of military occupation ==
The Tribunal considered the question of whether the Independent State of Croatia was a sovereign entity capable of acting independently of the German military, with Germany recognising the Croatian government on 15 April 1941. It concluded that Croatia was not and that military occupation depended not on the physical deployment of troops, as they could be redeployed into the territory at will, but on the control exercised by the occupying power. It followed that as the area remained under the control of the occupying power therefore "Logic and reason dictate that the occupant could not lawfully do indirectly that which it could not do directly".

== See also ==
- Subsequent Nuremberg Trials
- Command responsibility
- Kragujevac massacre
