= LANÇ counter-offensive in Albania (1944) =

Counter-offensive during World War II

1944 LANÇ counter-offensive in Albania
- Part of World War II in Albania and the Albanian Civil War (1943–1944)
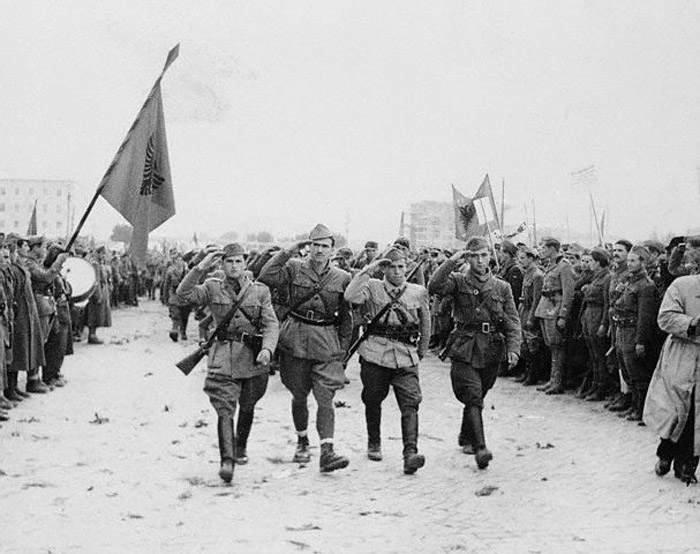
- Albanian Partisans marching in liberated Tirana
Date	mid-June – 29 November 1944
Location	Albania
Result	LANÇ victory: Defeat of Balli Kombëtar; Establishment of the Democratic Government of Albania; Liberation of Albania from German occupation

Belligerents
LANÇ Support: (United Kingdom) Royal Air Force; Bulgaria; Yugoslav Partisans	Germany; Balli Kombëtar

Commanders and leaders
Enver Hoxha; Mehmet Shehu; Spiro Moisiu	(Nazi Germany) Maximilian von Weichs (Nazi Germany) Alexander Löhr; Mit'hat Frashëri; Ali Këlcyra

Strength
40,000 men	700,000+ troops stationed (most not involved in combat)

The 1944 LANÇ counter-offensive in Albania was a large-scale counter-offensive organized by the National Liberation Movement of Albania with the goal of liberating Albania from German occupation, recapturing ground lost during the German winter offensive of 1943–44, and defeating the nationalist Balli Kombëtar who had been collaborating with the occupying German forces.

== Background ==
During the winter of 1943 and 1944, the Wehrmacht, together with Balli Kombëtar, carried out an offensive against the communist Albanian partisans. The Germans led several successful operations against LANÇ forces capturing most of Albania.

The Ballists also ambushed members of the British SOE in January 1944, killing and capturing many British soldiers and forcing the others to flee into the mountains during awful winter weather. Acting Brigadier Arthur Nicholls contracted severe frostbite while leading his men through the mountains and both of his feet needed to be amputated, after which he had to be dragged on a greatcoat. He died in Tirana of his wounds the following month.

On 29 May 1944, the National Liberation Front held the Congress of Përmet, which chose an Anti-Fascist Council of National Liberation to act as Albania's form of administration and legislature.

== Counter-offensive ==
During mid-June 1944, LANÇ forces commanded by Enver Hoxha and Mehmet Shehu mounted a counter-offensive against the German and Ballist forces.

The first operation that the communists undertook was against the nationalist Balli Kombëtar in Southern Albania during Summer 1944 which ultimately led to the Albanian partisans capturing the region. During this operation the LANÇ forces liberated Vlorë after a short-battle with the German forces in the area.

Scattered Ballist forces regrouped in Pezë, Tirana where they gathered reinforcements before retreating towards Northern Albania and Kosovo, leading to clashes breaking out between 21–23 September in Kukës.

In July 1944 German forces occupied Peshkopi, but later that month they were forced to withdraw by the communists. Fighting continued in the Dibër region until early September and ultimately led to the LANÇ troops capturing the region. During the same time, communist forces ambushed a group of German troops near the town of Librazhd, killing 200 men and capturing the town.

On 15 October 1944, LANÇ forces, together with the Yugoslav Partisans, and Bulgaria, mounted an Operation in Kosovo against the German army, Ballists, and the Government of National Salvation. The operation lasted until 22 November, during which the communist Albanians mounted an offensive against the Ballists in the Dukagjin region, attacking their forces in the Gjakova highlands. The operation was an allied success and led to their capture of Kosovo. On 23 October, during the Operation, 131 LANÇ soldiers were captured and executed by the SS Skanderbeg. After the defeat in Kosovo, most Balli Kombëtar forces deserted and dispersed, with its main leaders, Mit'hat Frashëri and Ali Këlcyra fleeing Albania.

The final engagements of the counter-offensive occurred during the month of November. On 17 November 1944, after a 19-day battle which started on 28 October, LANÇ liberated Tirana from the Germans, killing some 2,000 German soldiers and capturing all of Central Albania. Afterwards, communist troops also liberated Krujë. The final city under German occupation was Shkodër, which was liberated by LANÇ forces on 29 November 1944 and thus marked the end of the German occupation of Albania.

== Aftermath ==
After the war, anti-communist forces organized the Committee of the Mountains, which led anti-communist movements in the northern regions of Albania. In 1945–1946, two major anti-communist uprisings took place in Postribë and Koplik, but both failed. The communist regime created the "Forcat e Ndjekjes" (Pursuit Forces) to track and eliminate anti-communist leaders, particularly Muharrem Bajraktari and Gjon Markagjoni.

Enver Hoxha set up a communist regime in Albania in 1944, with Albania remaining under communism until 1989.
