= German winter offensive in Albania (1943–1944) =

German winter offensive in Albania

German Winter Offensive in Albania (1943–1944)
- Part of World War II in Albania and the Albanian Civil War (1943–1944)
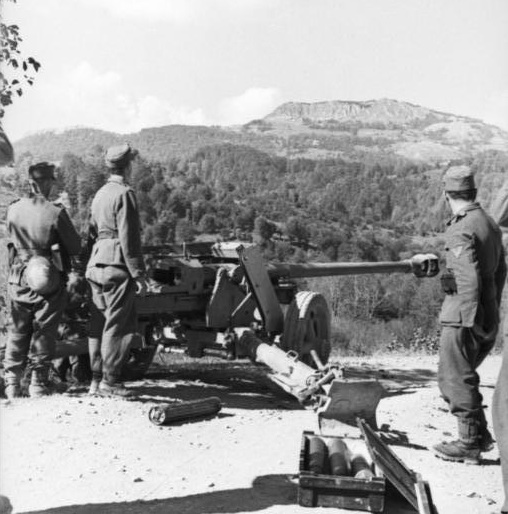
- German soldiers in Albania, 1943
Date	1943–1944
Location	Albania
Result	Tactical German victory
Territorial changes	Most of Albania recaptured by the Wehrmacht

Belligerents
LANÇ (United Kingdom) SOE	Germany; Balli Kombëtar

Commanders and leaders
Enver Hoxha; Mehmet Shehu (United Kingdom) Edmund Davies (POW) (United Kingdom) Arthur Nicholls †	(Nazi Germany) Maximilian von Weichs; Mid'hat Frashëri

Units involved
1st Assault Brigade; 2nd Assault Brigade; 3rd Assault Brigade; Royal Air Force: 334th Wing	118th Jäger Division; 100th Jäger Division (Nazi Germany) 92nd Motorized Regiment; 297th Infantry Division

Strength
35,000 soldiers	(Nazi Germany) 45,000 soldiers 10,000 soldiers

Casualties and losses
1,000–2,876 killed 1,000–1,650 captured	(Nazi Germany) unknown unknown

The German winter offensive in Albania (Albanian: Ofensiva Gjermane e Dimrit në Shqipëri; German: Deutsche Winteroffensive in Albanien), also known as the Winter campaign (Albanian: Fushata e Dimrit; German: Winterfeldzug), was a military campaign carried out by German forces during their occupation of Albania in 1943–1944. The primary objective of this offensive was to secure southern Albania in case of a retreat. To successfully achieve this goal, the Germans needed to weaken the Albanian Partisan resistance, which had posed a significant challenge to their control in the region.

== Background ==
In early August 1943, representatives from the Balli Kombëtar and the National Liberation Movement (LANÇ) met in the village of Mukaj, near Tirana, to discuss a potential alliance against the Axis powers and to outline the future of an ethnic Albanian state. The conference was facilitated by British emissaries, who aimed to unify Albania's political factions in resistance to fascist occupation, inspired by similar anti-fascist unity efforts, such as the AVNOJ in Yugoslavia.

After the Armistice of Cassibile in September 1943, which marked Italy's surrender to the Allies, Germany swiftly moved to occupy former Italian-controlled areas in the Balkans and southern France. In Albania, the German invasion presented an opportunity for both the Albanian Partisans to reclaim occupied territory. During this period, towns such as Gjirokastër and Këlcyrë were captured by local forces, while intense fighting erupted in Berat and Pogradec. Greek forces also advanced into southern Albania, capturing Sarandë. The 1st Partisan Assault Brigade launched numerous attacks against German troops across the Elbasan-Krrabë-Tirana district. Meanwhile, the Balli Kombëtar made an agreement with the Germans and formed a "neutral government" in the autumn of 1943.

== Campaign ==
After continuous harassment by Albanian Partisans and the need to secure southern Albania in the event of a retreat, the German Wehrmacht launched a massive offensive during the winter of 1943–1944. This operation involved four German divisions, numbering approximately 45,000 soldiers, supported by tanks and aircraft.

On 15 or 16 October 1943, Brigadier general Edmund "Trotsky" Davies led a British military mission that parachuted into Albania to determine whether the communist-led LANÇ or the nationalist Balli Kombëtar deserved British support. Albania was near civil war, with the two groups already clashing in the Vlorë region. On 31 October, Davies met Enver Hoxha, who agreed to pause attacks on Ballist forces if they formally committed to fighting the Germans. On November 8, Balli leaders provided a written commitment but requested recognition, an Albanian committee in London, and a post-war Kosovo referendum. Despite this pledge, Hoxha held to his stance of fighting both internal and external enemies.

=== November ===
==== Operation 505 ====
On 5 November, German forces launched their first campaign against the Albanian Partisans, specifically targeting the Peza region near Tirana. The operation aimed to eliminate potential threats to the roads linking major cities such as Durrës, Tirana, and Elbasan. Over a span of eight days, the Germans killed some 100 "bandits" and Italians and captured 1,650 prisoners. Additionally, they captured a significant amount of heavy and light infantry weapons during the operation. The prisoners were later handed over to Albanian civil authorities in accordance with an agreement. On 13 November, the Germans declared the operation a success. However they would later be pushed from Pezë by LANÇ forces on 19 November.

==== Operatian Roter Mann and Edelweiss ====
After the success of Operation 505, German forces launched two additional operations aimed at suppressing Albanian Partisans. Operation "Roter Mann" targeted and cleared Partisan forces from Berat, while Operation "Edelweiss" pushed them out of the Dibra and Peshkopi regions. Both operations, conducted in November, were declared successful by German command.

=== December ===
==== Operation Bergkessel ====
On 14 December, German forces launched a sweeping operation to clear Partisan resistance from the Mesaplik and Kurvelesh regions. The operation involved the 54th Regiment of the 100th Jäger Division, totaling 6,500 soldiers, supported by artillery and reinforced by 1,500 Ballist fighters. This force engaged with the 1st Partisan Assault Brigade, led by Mehmet Shehu, consisting of about 2,000 fighters. The most intense fighting occurred in Mesaplik, where, on 15 December, German forces attempted to enter the area 15 times but were repelled each time. The operation ended on 23 December with minimal territorial gains and ultimately failed to achieve its main objectives.

==== Operation 1828 ====
On 19 December, German and Balli Kombëtar forces launched a joint operation against Albanian Partisan leaders and British SOE officers in Çermenikë and Martanesh, where Edmund Davies and his team were located. German aircraft conducted reconnaissance in advance, and the German forces included six infantry battalions, three artillery companies from the 100th Jäger and 297th Infantry Divisions, two engineer companies from the Brandenburg Regiment, and 1,500 Ballist fighters. The Partisan forces included the 2nd and 3rd Assault Brigades, as well as the Çermenikë and Martanesh Battalions. German forces encircled the area and inflicted heavy casualties, particularly on the 2nd Assault Brigade, rendering it ineffective as a unified force. In a move reminiscent of Mao's Long March, the 1st Assault Brigade led by Mehmet Shehu arrived to attempt a rescue. By 23 December, they managed to open a narrow corridor for retreat, but the German and Ballist forces had nearly annihilated Partisan resistance, shattering its military and political power north of the Shkumbin River, leaving less than three demoralized small chetas intact.

In December, another SOE group led by Tony Northrop landed in Albania to aid the resistance but went into hiding due to the ongoing German offensive.

=== Ballist Ambush on British SOE ===
There are conflicting accounts regarding the ambush that resulted in the wounding and capture of Davies and the death of his lieutenant, Arthur Nicholls. One account states that the incident occurred in December 1943, with the ambush carried out by Balli Kombëtar forces in the mountains of Biza. Another account suggests that the event took place later, in January 1944.

== Aftermath ==
In mid-June 1944, the Albanian LANÇ launched a counter-offensive against the Germans, successfully capturing several large towns. The 1st Assault Division, LANÇ's only division at the time, was then deployed to central and northern Albania to continue the campaign.
