= Maximilian von Weichs =

German Field Marshal (1881–1954)

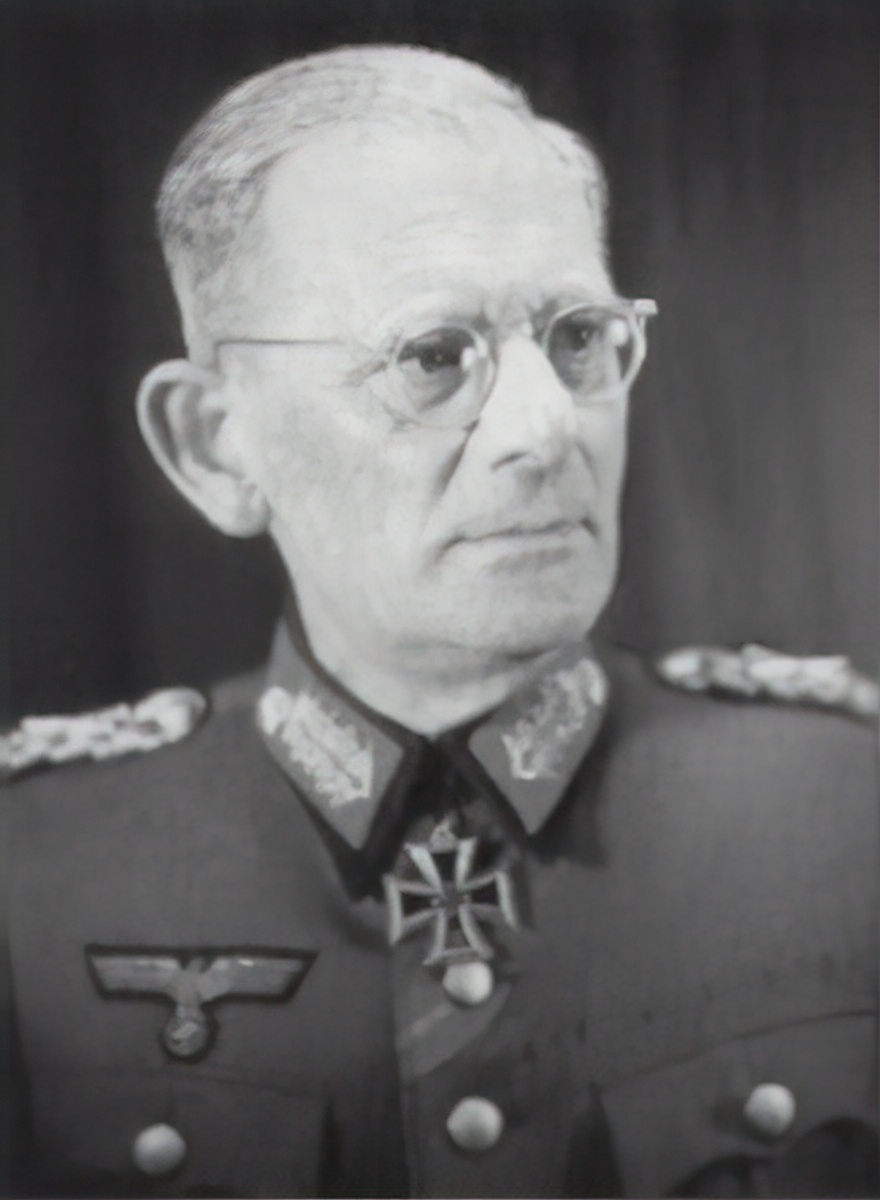
- Weichs, c. 1943–1945
- Born: 12 November 1881; Dessau, Germany
- Died: 27 September 1954 (aged 72); Bonn, West Germany
- Military career
- Allegiance: Germany
- Branch: German Army
- Service years: 1900–1945
- Rank: Generalfeldmarschall
- Commands: 1st Panzer Division; XIII Corps; 2nd Army; Army Group B Army Group F OB Südost
- Conflicts: World War I; World War II; Invasion of Poland; Battle of France; Invasion of Yugoslavia; Operation Barbarossa; Battle of Stalingrad; Belgrade Offensive; Battle of Pezë (1943); Albanian Civil War (1943–1944); German winter offensive in Albania (1943–1944); LANÇ counter-offensive in Albania (1944)
- Awards: Knight's Cross of the Iron Cross with Oak Leaves

Maximilian Maria Joseph Karl Gabriel Lamoral Reichsfreiherr von und zu Weichs an der Glonn (12 November 1881 – 27 September 1954) was a German Generalfeldmarschall (Field marshal) in the Wehrmacht of Nazi Germany during World War II.

Born into an aristocratic family, Weichs joined the Bavarian cavalry in 1900 and fought in the First World War. At the outbreak of the Second World War he commanded the XIII Corps in the invasion of Poland. He later commanded the 2nd Army during the invasions of France, Yugoslavia and the Soviet Union.

In August 1942 during Case Blue, the German offensive in southern Russia, he was appointed commander of Army Group B. In 1944, Weichs commanded Army Group F in the Balkans overseeing the German retreat from Greece and most of Yugoslavia. During the Nuremberg Trials, Weichs was implicated in war crimes committed in the Balkans, and was scheduled to take part in the US Army's Hostages Trial. He was removed from the proceeding for "medical reasons" without having been judged or sentenced.

== Early life and World War I ==
Born in 1881 into an aristocratic family, Maximilian von Weichs entered the Bavarian cavalry in 1900 and participated in World War I as a staff officer.

== Inter-war years ==
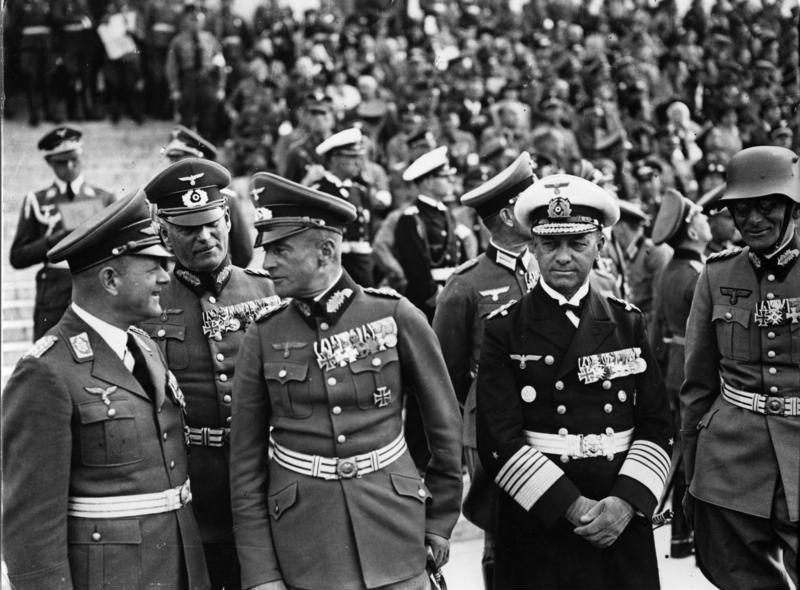
Generals Milch, Keitel, Brauchitsch, Admiral Raeder and Weichs at the 1938 Nuremberg Rally

After the war, Weichs remained in the newly created Reichswehr where he worked at a number of General Staff positions. Transferred from the 3rd Cavalry Division to command Germany's 1st Panzer Division upon its formation in October 1935, he led the unit in maneuvers that impressed Army Commander-in-Chief Werner von Fritsch. Weichs' aristocratic and cavalry credentials demonstrated the continuing influence of these military elites in Germany's modernizing force. In October 1937, he became the commander of the XIII Army Corps that later served in the 1938 German annexation of the Sudetenland.

== World War II ==
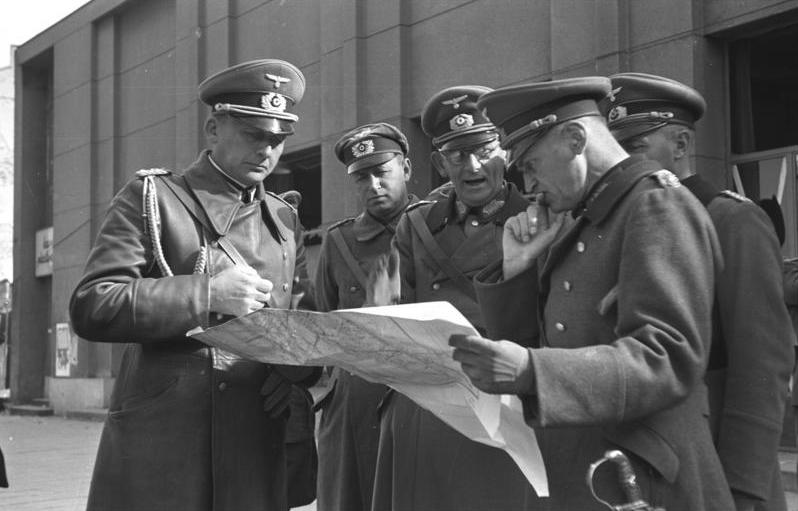
Weichs (third from left) with Johannes Blaskowitz (right, holding map) in Warsaw during the invasion of Poland, 1939

To prepare for the German invasion of Poland beginning World War II in 1939, Weichs was appointed head of his own Army Corps "Weichs". After the Polish surrender, he was made Commander-in-Chief of the 2nd Army, a part of Gerd von Rundstedt's Army Group A in the West. After the Battle of France, he was awarded the Knight's Cross of the Iron Cross and promoted to Generaloberst.

Leading his army, Weichs later took part in the Balkans Campaign, where on May 19, shortly after the capitulation of Yugoslavia, he ordered a target reprisal ratio of one hundred Serbs to be killed for each German soldier wounded by Yugoslav Partisans. In preparation for Operation Barbarossa, the German invasion of the Soviet Union, he was assigned to lead the 2nd Army as a part of Fedor von Bock’s Army Group Centre. He led the 2nd Army in 1941 through the Battle of Kiev, the Battle of Smolensk, and then on to Vyazma and Bryansk.

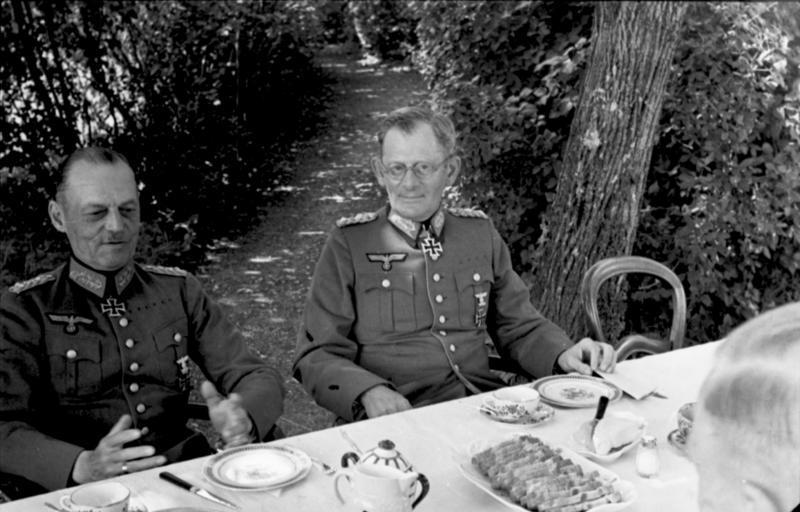
Gerd von Rundstedt with Weichs in France, June 1940

In 1942, for Fall Blau, Weichs was assigned to lead the newly created Army Group B. Army Group B was composed of Salmuth's 2nd Army, Hoth’s 4th Panzer Army, and Paulus's 6th Army. In addition to the German armies, Army Group B included the 2nd Hungarian Army, 8th Italian Army, the Third and the Fourth Romanian Armies. The 6th Army was assigned to take the city of Stalingrad and cover approximately 800 km of front.

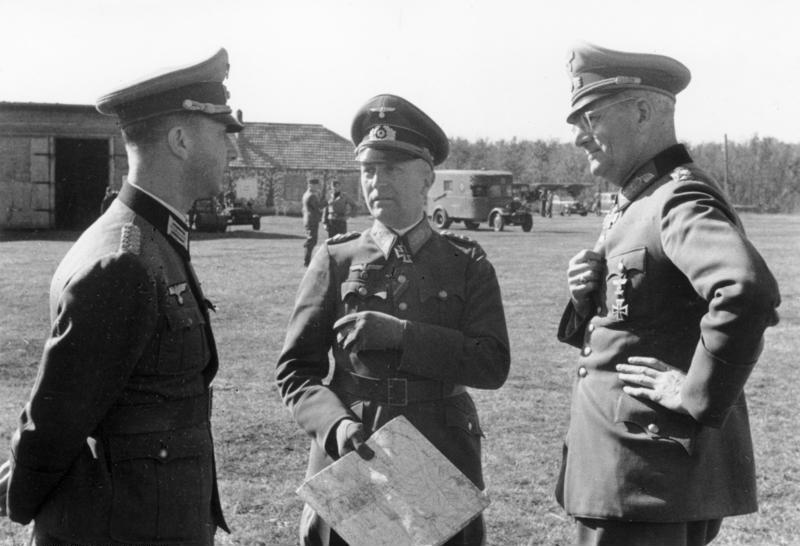
Weichs (right) in Russia during Case Blue, September 1942

The Soviet Operation Uranus broke through the Romanian armies on his flanks, cutting off the 6th Army inside Stalingrad. Suggesting retreat, Weichs fell out of Hitler’s favor. Consequently, parts of Army Group B were taken away from the command of Weichs and incorporated into a new "Army Group Don", led by Erich von Manstein. Later in February, the remaining part merged with the Don Group into a newly reinstated Army Group South, also led by Manstein. Weichs was relieved of command.

Weichs was promoted to Generalfeldmarschall on 1 February 1943. In August 1943, Weichs was appointed commander of Army Group F in the Balkans directing operations against local partisan groups. From August 1943, Weichs was also OB Südost, commander-in-chief of German-occupied Greece and the Balkans (Yugoslavia, Albania and Thrace). His headquarters were first in Belgrade and, from 5 October 1944, in Vukovar. In April 1944, Weichs was appointed the commander of all German troops in Hungary. In late 1944, he oversaw the German retreat from Greece and most of Yugoslavia.

== Post-war years ==
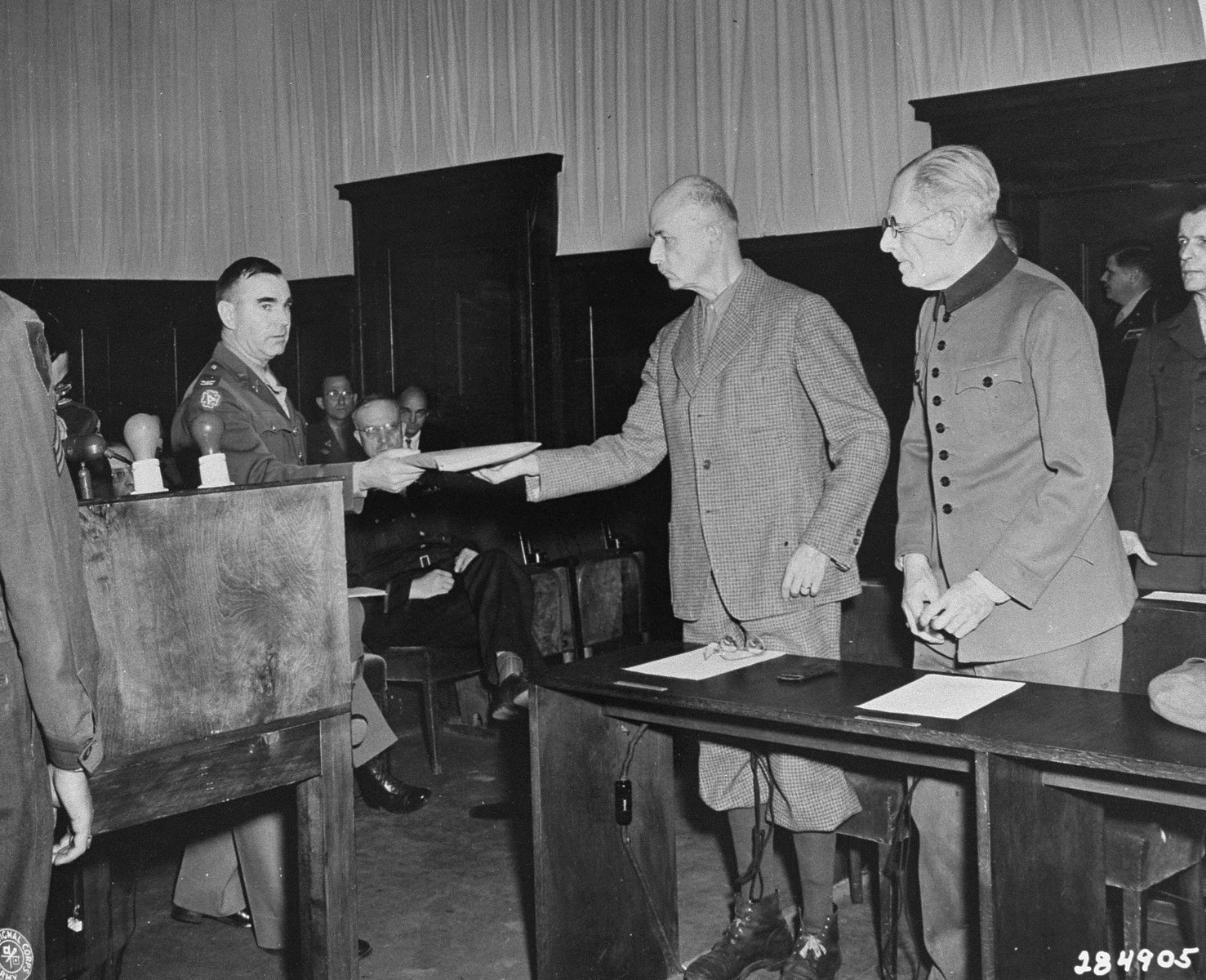
Weichs (right) in 1947 during The Hostages Trial

Weichs retired from his military career on 25 March 1945, and was arrested by American troops in May. During the Nuremberg Trials, Weichs was said to be implicated in war crimes committed during anti-partisan reprisals. He was removed from the US Army's Hostages Trial for medical reasons without having been judged or sentenced.

Weichs died on 27 September 1954 in Bonn, West Germany at the age of 72.

== Awards ==
- Iron Cross of 1914 2nd Class (20 September 1914) & 1st Class (12 November 1915)
- Clasp to the Iron Cross of 1939 2nd Class (18 September 1939) & 1st Class (29 September 1939)
- Knight's Cross of the Iron Cross with Oak Leaves
  - Knight's Cross on 29 June 1940 as General der Kavallerie and commander-in-chief of the 2. Armee
  - Oak Leaves on 5 February 1945 as Generalfeldmarschall and commander-in-chief of Heeresgruppe F and OB Südost (commander-in-chief south east)

Military offices
| Preceded by none | Commander of 1st Panzer Division; 1 October 1935 – 30 September 1937 | Succeeded by Generalleutnant Rudolf Schmidt |
| Preceded by none | Commander of XIII Army Corps; 1 October 1937 – October 1939 | Succeeded by Generaloberst Heinrich von Vietinghoff |
| Preceded by none | Commander of 2nd Army; 20 October 1939 – 13 July 1942 | Succeeded by General Hans von Salmuth |
| Preceded by Generalfeldmarschall Fedor von Bock | Commander of Army Group South; July 1942 – 12 February 1943 | Succeeded by Generaloberst Erich von Manstein |
| Preceded by none | Commander of Army Group F (Belgrade); 26 August 1943 – 25 March 1945 | Succeeded by none |
| Preceded by Generaloberst Alexander Löhr | Commander-in-Chief in the Southeast; 26 August 1943 – 25 March 1945 | Succeeded by Generaloberst Alexander Löhr |
