= Walter Kuntze =

German general and war criminal (1883–1960)

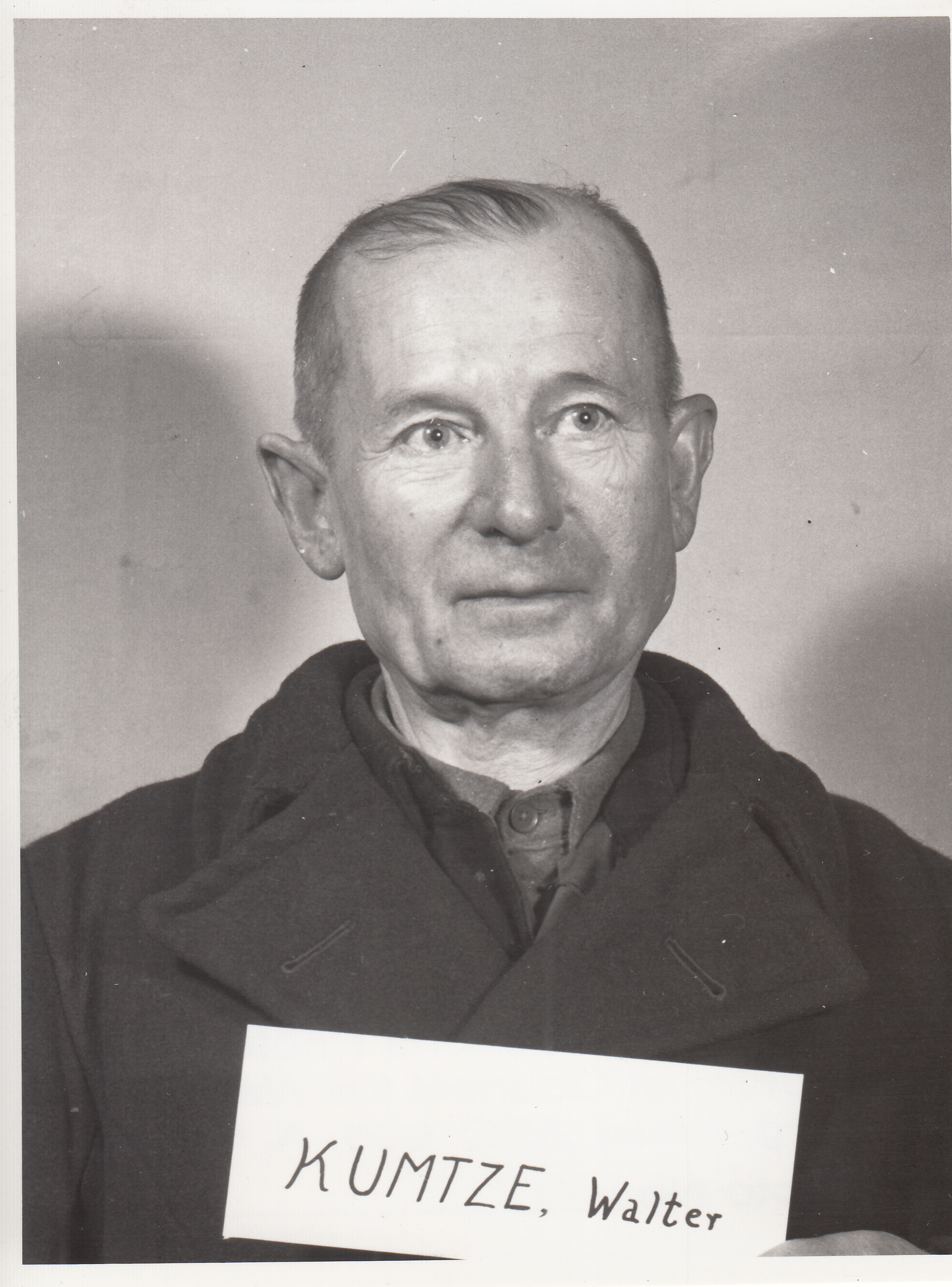
- Kuntze, (c. 1946–1949)
- Born: 23 February 1883; Pritzerbe, Province of Brandenburg, Kingdom of Prussia, German Empire
- Died: 1 April 1960 (aged 77); Detmold, North Rhine-Westphalia, West Germany
- Military career
- Allegiance: German Empire; Weimar Republic; Nazi Germany
- Branch: Imperial German Army; Reichswehr; German Army
- Service years: 1902–1945
- Rank: General der Pioniere
- Commands: 6th Infantry Division; XXIV Army Corps; XXXXII Army Corps; 12th Army
- Conflicts: World War I; World War II; Battle of France; Operation Barbarossa; Siege of Leningrad
- Awards: Knight's Cross of the Iron Cross

Walter Kuntze (23 February 1883 – 1 April 1960) was a German general and war criminal during World War II who commanded the 12th Army and was responsible for the Kragujevac massacre, the murder of nearly 2,800 men and boys in occupied Serbia.

== Life and career ==
Kuntze was born at Rathenow (today, Pritzerbe, Poland) in 1883. He entered the Royal Prussian Army in 1902 and fought in World War I. At the end of the war, he was an Hauptmann and the chief of operations of the 4th Cavalry Division. He remained in the post-war Reichswehr as a career officer. He served as the commander of the 6th Infantry Division between 1935 and 1938. He next commanded the XXIV Army Corps until February 1940 and then the XXXXII Army Corps until October 1941 when he assumed command of the 12th Army.

== War crimes ==
Kuntze was the commanding officer responsible for the execution of men and teenage boys in the Kragujevac massacre, when Serbian civilians were murdered in reprisal for an attack on German troops, at the ratio of one hundred Serbs for every German soldier killed. Kuntze was assigned Deputy Wehrmacht Commander Southeast and Commander-in-Chief of the 12th Army on 29 October 1941. This was a temporary appointment, until Wilhelm List could return to duty. On 31 October, Franz Böhme submitted a report to Kuntze in which he detailed the shootings in Serbia:

"Shooting: 405 hostages in Belgrade (total up to now in Belgrade, 4,750). 90 Communists in Camp Sebac. 2,300 hostages in Kragujevac. 1,700 hostages in Kraljevo."

Executions of Serbian civilians continued well into the following year. Kuntze stated the following in a directive of 19 March 1942:

"The more unequivocal and the harder reprisal measures are applied from the beginning the less it will become necessary to apply them at a later date. No false sentimentalities! It is preferable that 50 suspects are liquidated than one German soldier lose his life…If it is not possible to produce the people who have participated in any way in the insurrection or to seize them, reprisal measures of a general kind may be deemed advisable, for instance, the shooting to death of all male inhabitants from the nearest villages, according to a definite ratio (for instance, one German dead: 100 Serbs, one German wounded: 50 Serbs)."

Kuntze surrendered to the Allied troops in 1945 and was tried at the Hostages Trial in 1947. He was found guilty and sentenced to life imprisonment, but was released on medical parole in 1953. He died on 1 April 1960.

== Awards and decorations ==
- Iron Cross (1914)
  - 2nd Class
  - 1st Class
- Knight's Cross of the House Order of Hohenzollern with swords
- Military Merit Order of Bavaria, 4th class with swords
- Hanseatic Cross of Hamburg
- Military Merit Cross of Austria-Hungary, 3rd class with war decoration
- Gallipoli Star
- Order of Military Merit (Bulgaria)
- Wound Badge in black
- Honour Cross of the World War 1914/1918
- Iron Cross (1939)
  - 2nd Class
  - 1st Class
- War Merit Cross, 1st and 2nd class with swords
- German Cross in Silver (2 December 1943)
- Knight's Cross of the Iron Cross on 18 October 1941 as General der Pioniere and commander of XXXXII. Armeekorps

== See also ==
- Hostages Trial
- List of Axis personnel indicted for war crimes

Military offices
Preceded by none	Commander of 6. Infanterie-Division; 15 May 1935 – 1 March 1938	Succeeded by Generalleutnant Arnold Freiherr von Biegeleben
Preceded by none	Commander of XXIV. Armeekorps; 1 October 1938 – 14 February 1940	Succeeded by General der Panzertruppe Leo Freiherr Geyr von Schweppenburg
Preceded by none	Commander of XXXXXII. Armeekorps; 15 February 1940 – 10 October 1941	Succeeded by Generalleutnant Hans Graf von Sponeck
Preceded by Generalfeldmarschall Wilhelm List	Commander of 12th Army; 29 October 1941 – 2 July 1942	Succeeded by Generaloberst Alexander Löhr
