= Battle of Pezë (1943) =

- Part of World War II in Albania and Albanian Civil War (1943–1944)
Date	6–19 November 1943
Location	Pezë, Albania
Result	LANÇ victory; Failure of the German military to wipe out the Partisans in Pezë; High German casualties

Belligerents
Germany: (Nazi Germany) Wehrmacht	LANÇ

Commanders and leaders
(Nazi Germany) Maximilian von Weichs	Myslim Peza

Strength
5,000	2,000

Casualties and losses
200 killed several artillery pieces destroyed	Unknown

The Battle of Peza was an attempt by German troops to clear the partisans from the area of Peza, which lies south of Tirana.

== Background ==
Since the end of October 1943, the Germans had infiltrated patrols to gather information and had secured the camouflaged service of a number of Albanians as guides. The Germans were looking to destroy the partisan structures in Pezë since the partisan presence there was very big.

== Battle ==
On November 3, 1943, the Germans moved from Peqin to the southern area of Tirana controlled by the partisans. On November 5, the Germans advanced from Peqin to Peza, but were stopped by the fighters of the partisan leader Myslim Peza, with many material losses for the Germans.

On November 6, the Germans returned from the south-west direction, from Petrela, and captured the base of the newly formed Third Brigade. The fighting continued in the following days. Myslim Peza did not foresee the attack, while under his command he had only 2000 partisans, against 5000 German soldiers equipped with artillery and mortars. However, he caused the Germans 200 killed according to British witnesses.

A part of the Third Brigade was withdrawn towards the east, along the Tirana-Elbasan road, while the remaining part continued with Myslim Peza towards Priska, 9 km east of Tirana. Myslim Peza together with his soldiers managed to escape. Meanwhile, in the third week of November 1943, the German forces, estimated at 5,000, repeatedly attacked the forces of Myslim Peza, around 2,000 of them, south of Tirana. The Germans were pushed back.

== Aftermath ==
After the German attack on Pezë, several battles occurred in Dibër, Berat, Vlorë, Korcë and Patos, almost all of which were victories for the Albanian partisans.
