= Arthur Nicholls (British Army officer) =

Special Operations Executive officer

- Nicholls in about 1942
- Born: 6 February 1911; Hampstead, London
- Died: 11 February 1944 (aged 33); Tirana, German-occupied Albania
- Burial place: Tirana Park Memorial Cemetery, Albania
- Military career
- Allegiance: United Kingdom
- Branch: British Army
- Service years: 1933–1944
- Rank: Brigadier
- Service number: 62269
- Units: Hertfordshire Yeomanry; Coldstream Guards; Special Operations Executive
- Conflicts: Second World War: Fall of France 1940; German winter offensive in Albania (DOW)
- Awards: George Cross; Emergency Reserve Decoration; Mentioned in Despatches

Brigadier Arthur Frederick Crane Nicholls, GC, ERD (6 February 1911 – 11 February 1944) was a British Army officer who was awarded the George Cross for gallantry and leadership on active service with the Special Operations Executive in Albania in 1944. He is the only member of the Coldstream Guards to have been awarded the decoration.

== Early life ==
Nicholls was born in Hampstead on 6 February 1911. He attended Shardlow Hall, Marlborough College in Wiltshire and studied law at Pembroke College, Cambridge. After graduating in 1933, he worked as a stockbroker. He was commissioned into the 86th (East Anglian) (Hertfordshire Yeomanry) Field Brigade, Royal Artillery, Territorial Army as a second lieutenant in August 1933, was promoted lieutenant on 3 August 1936, and transferred to the Coldstream Guards (Supplementary Reserve) in May 1937.

== Second World War ==
Mobilised in 1939, Nicholls went to France with the 2nd Battalion Coldstream Guards, but was soon posted to the Headquarters of the First Division as an Intelligence Officer to make the best use of his command of French and German. In May 1940 he was evacuated from Dunkirk, after which he was stationed in England.

In March 1942 he joined the Special Operations Executive (SOE). In October 1943, by now a temporary lieutenant-colonel, he parachuted into Albania to serve as Staff Officer to Brigadier Edmund Frank "Trotsky" Davies with the task of inciting resistance to the German occupation and tying down enemy forces.

Their Headquarters were attacked by enemy forces in January 1944 and they escaped to the mountains, pursued by the Germans and local militia. Davies was wounded and captured on 8 January 1944. Nicholls led the remains of the party to safety through dreadful winter weather. He suffered severe frostbite during the escape and had to have both his feet amputated, after this he was transported by being dragged on his greatcoat.

Nicholls received medical attention in the city of Tirana, however he died from his wounds on 11 February 1944 at the age of 33, after managing to make a final report on the situation in Albania to British authorities. He was mentioned in despatches on 1 June 1944. He is commemorated in a Commonwealth War Graves Commission cemetery, the Tirana Park Memorial Cemetery.

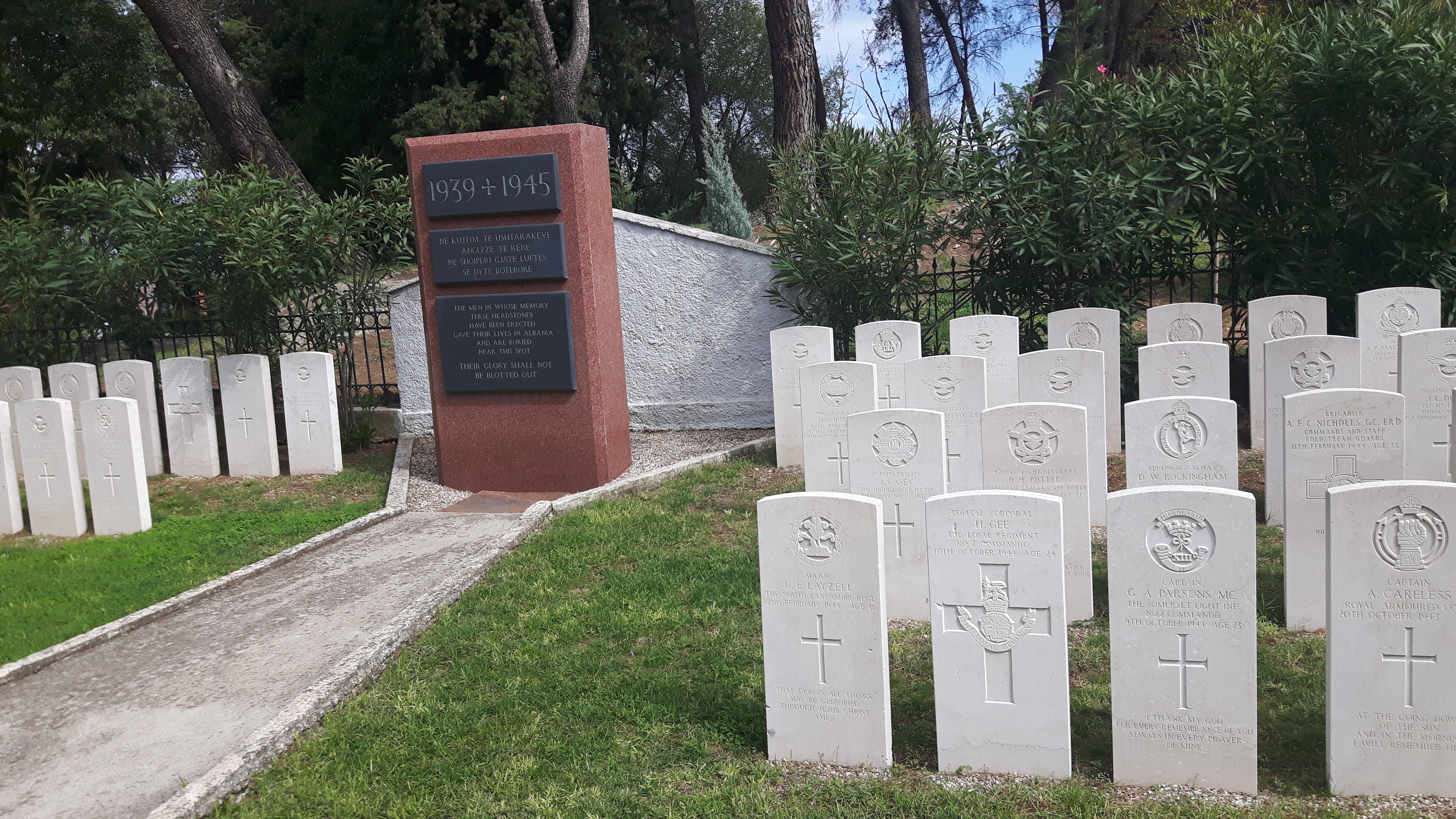
Tirana Park Memorial Cemetery

Nicholls' George Cross was gazetted on 26 February 1946, and dated 1 March 1946. The citation reads:

The King has been graciously pleased to approve the posthumous award of the George Cross, in recognition of most conspicuous gallantry in carrying out hazardous work in a very brave manner, to: — Major (temporary Lieutenant-Colonel) (acting Brigadier) Arthur Frederick Crane NICHOLLS (62269), Coldstream Guards (London).

— London Gazette

In January 1940 Nicholls married Dorothy Ann Violet Schuster, they having a daughter in 1943. His widow later married Archibald Dunlop Mackenzie who had also served with SOE during the war.

Research after his death by Lance Corporal Ian Tindall found that Nicholls was also entitled to receive the Emergency Reserve Decoration. His daughter applied and the award was gazetted in the London Gazette 47 years after he died in Albania, on 26 November 1991. All of Nicholls's medals have been presented to his regiment by his daughter.
