= Wilhelm List =

German field marshal (1880–1971)

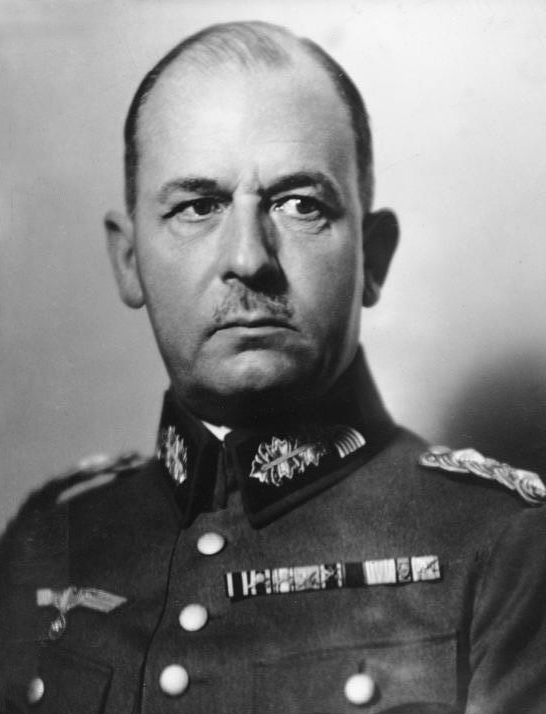
- List in 1935
- Born: 14 May 1880; Oberkirchberg, Kingdom of Württemberg, German Empire
- Died: 17 August 1971 (aged 91); Garmisch-Partenkirchen, Bavaria, West Germany
- Burial place: Munich Waldfriedhof
- Spouse(s): ∞ 1911 Hedwig Karoline Ernestine Kleinschroth; 3 children
- Military career
- Allegiance: German Empire; Weimar Republic; Nazi Germany
- Branch: Bavarian Army; Imperial German Army; Reichswehr; Heer (Wehrmacht)
- Service years: 1898–1942
- Rank: Generalfeldmarschall
- Commands: Army Group Command 2 Army Group Command 5; 14th Army; 12th Army; Army Group A
- Conflicts: World War I; World War II; Invasion of Poland; Invasion of France; Invasion of Yugoslavia; Battle of Greece; Case Blue
- Awards: Knight's Cross of the Iron Cross

Siegmund Wilhelm Walther List (14 May 1880 – 17 August 1971) was a German Generalfeldmarschall (Field Marshal) of the Wehrmacht during World War II.

List was a professional soldier in the Bavarian Army and served as a staff officer on the Western Front during World War I. List was a leading military training official of the Reichswehr in the interwar period. List commanded the 14th Army of the Wehrmacht in the invasion of Poland in 1939 and the 12th Army in the invasion of France in 1940 for which he was promoted to Field Marshal. List successfully commanded the 12th Army in the Balkans Campaign including the invasion of Yugoslavia and invasion of Greece in April 1941, overseeing anti-partisan operations until his resignation that October. List was appointed commander of Army Group A on the Eastern Front in July 1942, responsible for the main thrust towards the Caucasus during Case Blue. List's military and political disagreements with Adolf Hitler led to him being removed of his command and forced into retirement in September 1942.

After the war, List was put on trial by the Allies in the Hostages Trial, where he was convicted of war crimes and crimes against humanity for mass killings of civilians in Yugoslavia and sentenced to life imprisonment. List was released early in 1952 for poor health and died in 1971.

== Early years ==
Siegmund Wilhelm Walther List was born on 14 May 1880 in Oberkirchberg, Württemberg, the son of physician Walter List. List graduated from the Luitpold-Gymnasium in Munich and joined the Bavarian Army in 1898, and had entered the Bavarian General Staff by 1913.

List served in World War I at the front as a staff officer of infantry regiments, where one of his subordinates was then-Corporal Adolf Hitler. List served in the II Royal Bavarian Corps until the winter of 1915, when he fell seriously ill and had to undergo an operation. After recovering he was assigned to Army Detachment C until 1917 when he was transferred to the 8th Bavarian Reserve Division.

For his services during the war, he was awarded both classes of the Iron Cross, the Knight's Cross of the House Order of Hohenzollern with Swords, the Military Merit Order of Bavaria IV Class with Swords and Crown, the Knight's Cross of the Friedrich Order and the Wound Badge in Black. He was awarded the Military Merit Cross III Class with War Decoration from Austria-Hungary and the Knight's Cross of the Order of Military Merit from Bulgaria.

== World War I and interwar period ==
List remained in the Reichswehr of the Weimar Republic after the war, and served as a member of Freikorps Epp led by Colonel Franz Ritter von Epp that helped overthrow the Bavarian Soviet Republic in 1919. He became commander of 3rd (Jäger) Battalion of the 19th (Bavarian) Infantry Regiment in Kempten in 1922, and would primarily spend the next decade in military training for the Reichswehr. He was assigned to the 7th Division in Munich in 1924 and served as chief of staff officer training for Military District VII. List was called to the Ministry of the Reichswehr in 1926 where he was made director of military education and later commander of Dresden Infantry School. By 1932, he was promoted to Generalleutnant.

On 1 October 1933, List was appointed commander of Wehrkreis IV (Dresden) and commander of the 4th Division in Dresden. Two years later, on 1 October 1935, he was appointed General of the Infantry and was now Commanding General of the IV Army Corps. In February 1938, List took over the position of Commander-in-Chief of Army Group Command 2 in Kassel. On 1 April 1938, after the Anschluss, List was appointed Commander-in-Chief of Army Group Command 5 in Vienna, with the task of integrating the Austrian Federal Army into the Wehrmacht. On 1 April 1939, he was promoted to generaloberst.

== World War II ==
=== Poland ===
In late 1939, List commanded the 14th Army of the Wehrmacht in the invasion of Poland. It was List's task to advance his army into southern Poland immediately at the start of the invasion, to form the extreme southern wing of an encircling manoeuver carried out by the German forces aimed at trapping the Polish Army in the general region of Warsaw. He was unsuccessful in this mission, though he met advance elements of the XIX Panzer Corps under General Heinz Guderian a short distance south of Brest-Litovsk on 17 September 1939. Following the conclusion of the fighting in Poland, which was accelerated by Soviet invasion of the eastern part of the country (as agreed to in the Molotov–Ribbentrop Pact), List and his army remained posted in Poland as occupying forces.

=== Invasion of France ===
During the huge German offensive against France and the Low Countries from May to June 1940, the 14th Army remained in Poland while List commanded the 12th Army during the fall of France. The 12th Army was a unit of Army Group A under command of Gerd von Rundstedt that successfully forced through the Ardennes and then made the imperative breakthrough on 15 May 1940, which spread panic in the French forces and cut the British Expeditionary Force off from their supply lines.

After this successful campaign, List was among the twelve generals that Hitler promoted to Field Marshal during the 1940 Field Marshal Ceremony. In early 1941, German troops were being steadily massed on the Eastern Front in preparation for the German invasion of the Soviet Union. The OKW believed that before the invasion could be launched it would be necessary to eliminate the possibility of interference from Greece by militarily subduing this country. In an operation codenamed Operation Marita, List was delegated to negotiate with the Bulgarian Army's General Staff, and a secret agreement was signed allowing the free passage of German troops through Bulgarian territory. On the night of 28/29 February 1941, German troops (including List who now commanded the 12th Army) took up positions in Bulgaria, which the next day joined the Tripartite Pact.

=== Greece and Yugoslavia ===
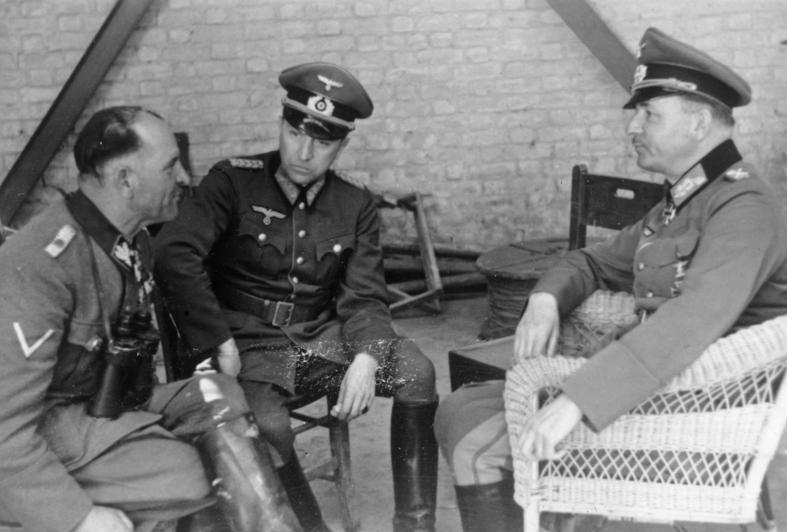
List (right) with Waffen-SS general Sepp Dietrich (left) in Greece, April 1941

On 6 April 1941, the Wehrmacht launched invasions of both Greece and Yugoslavia in what became the known as Balkans Campaign. List's 12th Army, consisting of four armored divisions and 11 motorized infantry divisions, totally outmatched the defending Greek and Yugoslav forces. German forces occupied Belgrade on 13 April and Athens on 27 April. The mainland campaign ended with the evacuation of British forces on 28 April. The Germans and their collaborationist allies were faced with resistance from various partisan groups. List became implicated in the mass killings of hundreds of thousands of civilians by having ordered hostage-taking and reprisal killings.

List resigned as chief of the 12th Army in October 1941 due to illness. In early 1942, he undertook an inspection tour of German-occupied Norway at Hitler's request to determine the country's preparedness for a potential British landing. List's open distaste for Nazism had already caused him to fall out of favour with Hitler, who did not want to give him a new command and only reconsidered at the insistence of various officers in the Wehrmacht leadership.

=== Summer campaign of 1942 and dismissal ===
In early July 1942, List took command of Army Group A on the Eastern Front, newly formed from the split of Army Group South during the German summer offensive named Case Blue. His orders were to take Rostov-on-Don and then advance into the Caucasus to take oil-rich areas of Maikop and Grozny. German forces made good progress for two months, taking Maikop and advancing almost to Grozny, never reaching Grozny despite having the opportunity to capture it because List wrongly diverted forces to unnecessarily secure his right flank. However, by the end of August their advance had ground to a halt, chiefly due to considerably stiffened Red Army resistance, and also due to critical shortages of fuel and ammunition as the army group outran its supply lines. Matters were made worse for the Germans by the removal in mid-August of most Luftwaffe combat units to the north to support the 6th Army at the Battle of Stalingrad. Hitler was angered by the loss of momentum in the Caucasus and sent Alfred Jodl on 7 September to tell List to make faster progress. List explained to Jodl that he did not have enough forces to break through the Soviet lines to capture Grozny, and also believed that it was still possible to capture Grozny if all the other attacks were suspended and his army group was given priority in supplies and reinforcements. Jodl subsequently agreed with List and he relayed this information to Hitler, who became furious. Hitler relieved List of his command on 9 September when he proposed moving some stalled spearhead units to another, less advanced portion of the front to assist in destroying stubborn Soviet forces. Hitler placed himself in command of Army Group via the OKH, stating that "Field Marshal List led sluggishly", until he appointed Paul Ludwig Ewald von Kleist as commander on 22 November 1942.

List never returned to active duty and spent the rest of the war at his home in Garmisch-Partenkirchen, where he was arrested by the American occupation force in May 1945.

== War crimes trial ==
In 1947, List and eleven of his former subordinates from the 12th Army were charged with war crimes and crimes against humanity — primarily the hostage-taking and reprisal killing of Serbian hostages in Yugoslavia — in what became known as the Hostages Trial of the "Subsequent Nuremberg Trials". List was tried in front of a U.S. military court and convicted on two charges: the mass killing of civilians, and the "Murder and ill-treatment of thousands of soldiers and prisoners of war", and arbitrarily designating combatants as "partisans" and other categories, denying them the status of prisoners of war and having them summarily executed. In his closing statement, he denied his guilt, and argued that his actions were a response to the "cruel and underhanded" style of fighting in the Balkans. List was sentenced to life imprisonment in February 1948.

On 31 January 1951, the US High Commissioner John J. McCloy rejected a request for clemency for List. McCloy justified the decision by arguing List had approved anti-partisan tactics and operations that were excessively brutal to be justifiable. Additionally, McCloy stated troops under his command had been involved in the Final Solution in Yugoslavia unrelated to their military duties.

== Later life ==
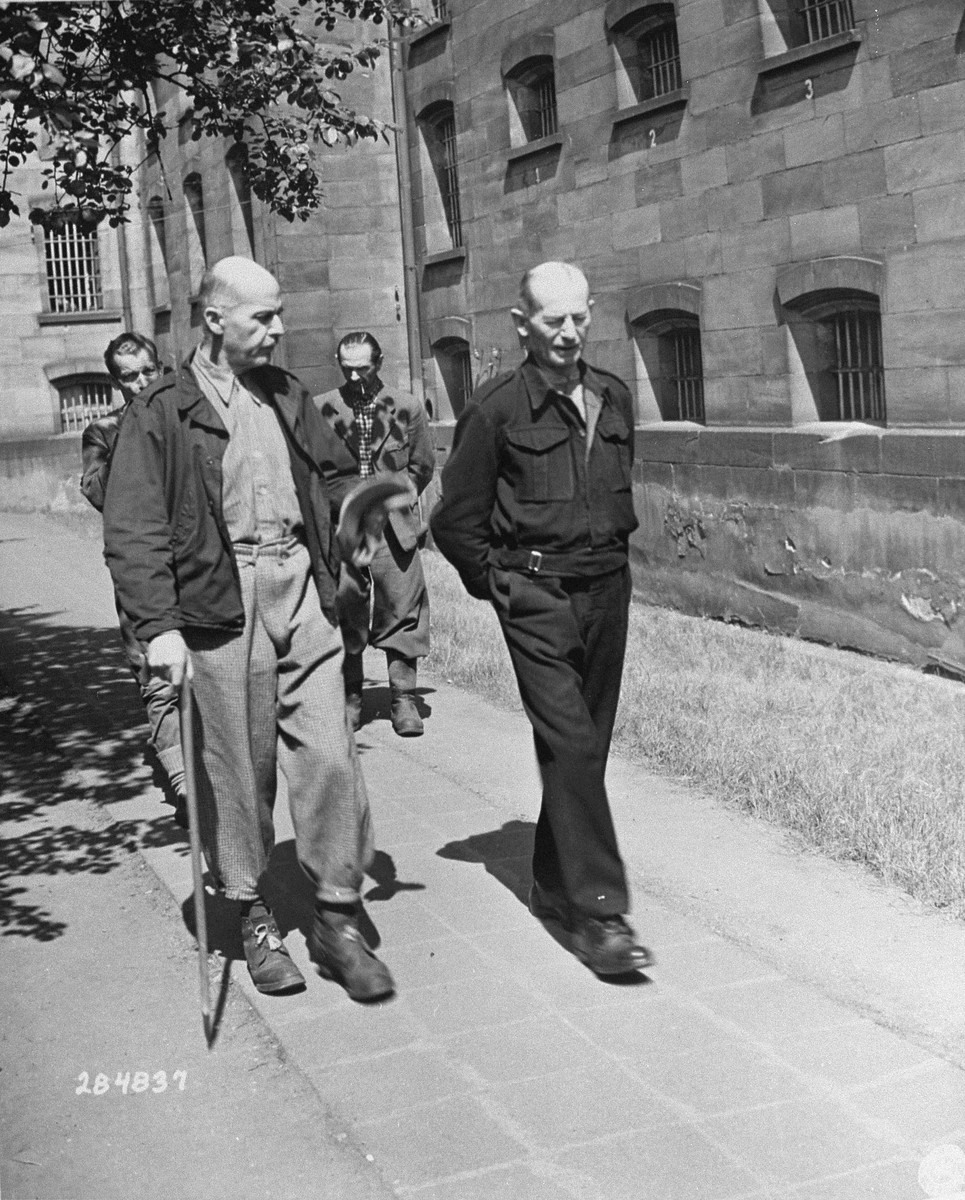
Wilhelm List (left) and Walter Kuntze (right) take a walk in the prison yard during the Hostage Trial.

List was released from Landsberg Prison in December 1952, having served four years, officially compassionate release because of ill health. However, he returned to his home in Garmisch-Partenkirchen and lived for another nineteen years, dying on 17 August 1971 at the age of 91.

== Promotions ==
- Fahnenjunker – 15 July 1898
- Fähnrich – 8 February 1899
- Leutnant – 7 March 1900
- Oberleutnant – 9 March 1908
- Hauptmann – 22 March 1913 without Patent
  - 31 March 1916 received Patent from 20 October 1914 (15a)
- Major – 19 August 1919 without Patent
  - 26 September 1919 received Patent from 20 September 1918 (8)
- Oberstleutnant – 1 October 1923
  - 17 March 1924 received new Rank Seniority (RDA) from 15 November 1922 (6a)
- Oberst – 1 March 1927
- Generalmajor – 1 November 1930
- Generalleutnant – 1 October 1932
- General der Infanterie – 1 October 1935
- Generaloberst – 31 March 1939 with effect from 1 April 1939
- Generalfeldmarschall – 19 July 1940

== Awards and decorations (excerpt) ==
- Japanese Order of the Rising Sun, 6th Class on 29 September 1908
- Iron Cross (1914), 1st and 2nd class
- Knights Cross of the House Order of Hohenzollern with Swords
- Military Merit Order, 4th class with Swords and Crown (Bavaria)
- Knight's Cross of the Friedrich Order (Württemberg)
- Military Merit Cross, 3rd class with war decoration (Austria-Hungary)
- Knight's Cross of the Order of Military Merit (Bulgaria) (Bulgaria) with Swords
- Wound Badge (1918) in black
- Honour Cross of the World War 1914/1918 with Swords on 13 December 1934
- Wehrmacht Long Service Award, 4th to 1st Class with Oak Leaves
  - 1st Class for 25 years on 2 October 1936
  - Oak Leaves for 40 years on 12 September 1939
- Order of the Crown of Italy, Knight Grand Cross on 24 September 1937
- Hungarian Order of Merit, Grand Cross on 21 August 1938 (permission to accept and wear on 26 September 1938)
- Anschluss Medal on 19 June 1939
- Clasp to the Iron Cross (1939), 1st and 2nd class
- Knight's Cross of the Iron Cross on 30 September 1939 as Generaloberst and commander-in-chief of the 14. Armee

Military offices
Preceded by none	Commander of 12th Army; 13 October 1939 – 29 October 1941	Succeeded by General der Pioniere Walter Kuntze
