= 12th Army (Wehrmacht) =

- German: 12. Armee
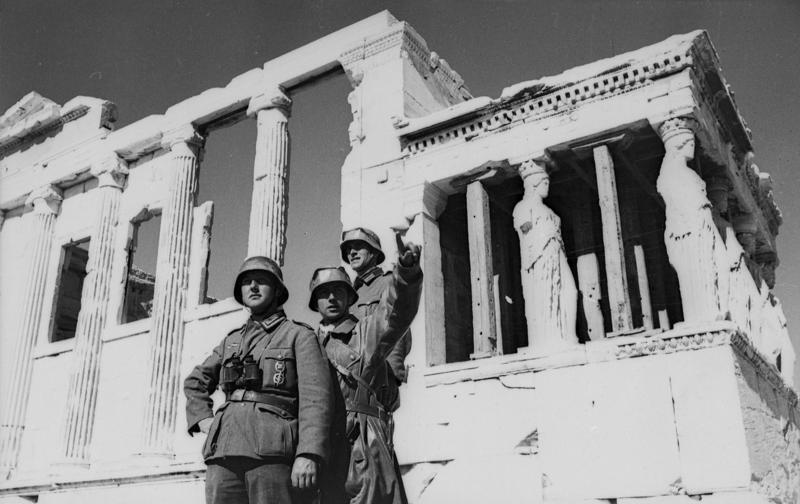
- Soldiers from the 12th Army on the Acropolis of Athens
- Active: 1939–1942; 1945
- Country: Nazi Germany
- Branch: German army ( Wehrmacht)
- Size: Field army
- Part of: Army Group A (May 1940); OKH/OKW (1941); OKW (1942/43)
- Engagements: Battle of France; Invasion of Yugoslavia; Invasion of Greece; Battle of Berlin

The 12th Army (German: 12. Armee) was a World War II field army of the Wehrmacht.

== History ==
=== Campaign in the west ===
The 12th Army was activated on October 13, 1939, with General Wilhelm List in command. First seeing defensive action along the Siegfried Line, the army was part of Rundstedt's Army Group A responsible for the Ardennes offensive. It had under its command seven infantry divisions and one mountain division in May 1940. After the breakthrough on the Meuse near Sedan, the infantry divisions fought their way to the Aisne. In the ensuing Fall Rot the army marched to the Swiss border and secured the demarcation line with Zone libre. For the rest of 1940 the army was assigned to occupation duties in France.

=== Balkan campaign ===
In February 1941, an agreement between Field Marshal List and the Bulgarian General Staff allowed the passage of German troops. On the night of February 28, German Army units crossed the Danube from Romania and took up strategic positions in Bulgaria.

On 6 April, units of the 12th army advanced into Yugoslavia and Greece. The Yugoslavs crumbled first. After six months of fighting the Italians, the Greeks could not stand up to the 12th Army's fifteen divisions, four of which were armored. As the Greek army capitulated, four Commonwealth divisions rushed from North Africa to aid the Greeks were forced to evacuate after defeats at Olympus and Thermopylae. Elements of the army then participated in the conquest of Crete and the Aegean Islands. From June 1941 to the end of 1942 the army served occupation duties in Croatia, Serbia and Greece.

The 12th Army became Army Group E (Heeresgruppe E) on January 1, 1943.

=== Reactivation ===
The 12th Army was reconstituted on the Western Front near the Elbe River on April 10, 1945. With the command staff of the dissolved Army Group North, the army consisted of XLVIII, XX, and XXXI Army Corps. Under General Walther Wenck, the 12th Army made the last attempt by a German Army to relieve the besieged capital during the Battle of Berlin. Although it successfully reached Potsdam, the 12th Army was stopped by numerically superior Soviet Red Army forces and forced to abandon the effort to relieve Berlin. The 12th Army then linked up with the remnants of General Theodor Busse's decimated 9th Army south of Beelitz and, in the confusion of the Soviet breakthrough, provided a corridor to the west for soldiers and refugees alike to reach and cross the partially destroyed Elbe River bridge at Tangermünde and surrender to American forces between May 4 and May 7, 1945.

== Commanders ==
| No. | Portrait | Commander | Took office | Left office | Time in office |
|---|---|---|---|---|---|
| 1 | Wilhelm List | Generaloberst; Wilhelm List (1880–1971) | 13 October 1939 | 29 October 1941 | 2 years, 16 days |
| 2 | Walter Kuntze | General der Pioniere; Walter Kuntze (1883–1960) | 29 October 1941 | 2 July 1942 | 246 days |
| 3 | Alexander Löhr | Generaloberst; Alexander Löhr (1885–1947) | 3 July 1942 | 31 December 1942 | 181 days |
| 4 | Walther Wenck | General der Panzertruppe; Walther Wenck (1900–1982) | 10 April 1945 | 7 May 1945 | 27 days |

== See also ==
- 12th Army (German Empire) for the equivalent formation in World War I
- Battle of France
- Invasion of Yugoslavia
- Battle of Greece
- Battle of Berlin
